= List of awards and nominations received by Henry Mancini =

Henry Mancini awards and nominations
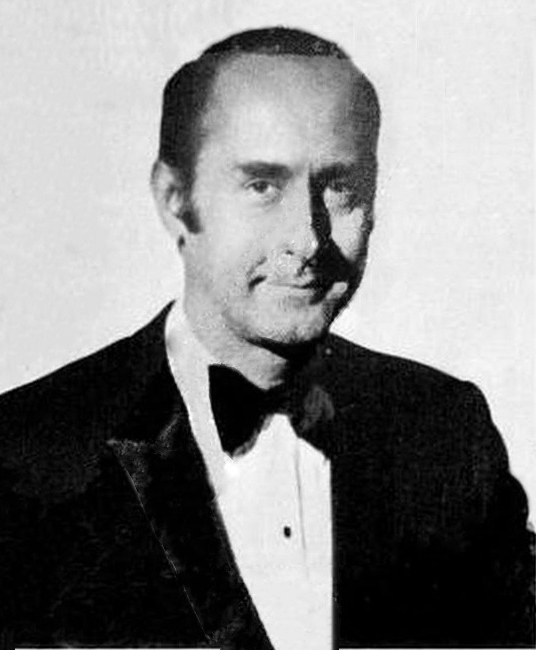
Mancini in 1970
Awards and nominations
Award	Wins	Nominations
Totals
Academy Awards	4	18
Golden Globe Awards	1	11
Golden Raspberry Awards	0	2
Grammy Awards	20	72
International Film Music Critics Association	1	4
Primetime Emmy Awards	0	2
Wins	26
Nominations	109

Henry Mancini was an American composer, conductor, arranger, pianist and flautist.

He received four Academy Awards, twenty Grammy Awards, and a Golden Globe Award. He was also nominated for two Primetime Emmy Awards.

== Major awards ==
=== Academy Awards ===
Year	Category	Nominated work	Result	Ref.
1954	Best Scoring of a Musical Picture	The Glenn Miller Story	Nominated	
1961	Best Music Score of a Dramatic or Comedy Picture	Breakfast at Tiffany's	Won	
1961	Best Song	"Bachelor in Paradise" (from Bachelor in Paradise)	Nominated	
1961	Best Song	"Moon River" (from Breakfast at Tiffany's)	Won	
1962	Best Song	"Days of Wine and Roses" (from Days of Wine and Roses)	Won	
1963	Best Song	"Charade" (from Charade)	Nominated	
1964	Best Music Score – Substantially Original	The Pink Panther	Nominated	
1964	Best Song	"Dear Heart" (from Dear Heart)	Nominated	
1965	Best Song	"The Sweetheart Tree" (from The Great Race)	Nominated	
1970	Best Original Score	Sunflower	Nominated	
1970	Best Original Song Score	Darling Lili	Nominated	
1970	Best Song – Original for the Picture	"Whistling Away the Dark" (from Darling Lili)	Nominated	
1971	Best Song – Original for the Picture	"All His Children" (from Sometimes a Great Notion)	Nominated	
1976	Best Original Song	"Come to Me" (from The Pink Panther Strikes Again)	Nominated	
1979	Best Original Score	10	Nominated	
1979	Best Original Song	"It's Easy to Say" (from 10)	Nominated	
1982	Best Original Song Score and Its Adaptation or Adaptation Score	Victor/Victoria	Won	
1986	Best Original Song	"Life in a Looking Glass" (from That's Life!)	Nominated	

=== Golden Globe Awards ===
Year	Category	Nominated work	Result	Ref.
1964	Best Song	"Dear Heart" (from Dear Heart)	Nominated	
1965	Best Original Score	The Great Race	Nominated	
1965	Best Original Song	"The Sweetheart Tree" (from The Great Race)	Nominated	
1967	Best Original Score	Two for the Road	Nominated	
1970	Best Original Song	"Whistling Away the Dark" (from Darling Lili)	Won	
1973	Best Original Song	"Send a Little Love My Way" (from Oklahoma Crude)	Nominated	
1975	Best Original Score	The Return of the Pink Panther	Nominated	
1979	Best Original Score	10	Nominated	
1982	Best Original Score	Victor/Victoria	Nominated	
1986	Best Original Song	"Life in a Looking Glass" (from That's Life!)	Nominated	
1987	Best Original Score	The Glass Menagerie	Nominated	

=== Grammy Awards ===
Year	Category	Nominated work	Result	Ref.
1958	Album of the Year	The Music from Peter Gunn	Won	
1958	Best Performance by an Orchestra	The Music from Peter Gunn	Nominated	
1958	Best Arrangement	The Music from Peter Gunn	Won	
1958	Best Original Cast Album (Broadway or TV)	The Music from Peter Gunn	Nominated	
1959	Album of the Year	More Music from Peter Gunn	Nominated	
1959	Best Performance by an Orchestra	More Music from Peter Gunn	Nominated	
1959	Best Jazz Performance – Group	More Music from Peter Gunn	Nominated	
1959	Best Musical Composition First Recorded and Released in 1958 (Over 5 Minutes Duration)	More Music from Peter Gunn	Nominated	
1959	Best Soundtrack Album – Background Score from a Motion Picture or Television	More Music from Peter Gunn	Nominated	
1959	Best Arrangement	More Music from Peter Gunn	Nominated	
1960	Best Arrangement	"Mr. Lucky"	Won	
1960	Best Performance by an Orchestra	"Mr. Lucky"	Won	
1960	Best Performance by a Band for Dancing	The Blues and the Beat	Nominated	
1960	Best Jazz Performance Large Group	The Blues and the Beat	Won	
1960	Best Sound Track Album or Recording of Music Score from Motion Picture or Television	Mr. Lucky	Nominated	
1961	Album of the Year (Other Than Classical)	Breakfast at Tiffany's: Music from the Motion Picture	Nominated	
1961	Record of the Year	"Moon River"	Won	
1961	Song of the Year	"Moon River"	Won	
1961	Best Arrangement	"Moon River"	Won	
1961	Best Performance by an Orchestra – for Dancing	Mr. Lucky Goes Latin	Nominated	
1961	Best Performance by an Orchestra – for Other Than Dancing	Breakfast at Tiffany's: Music from the Motion Picture	Won	
1961	Best Sound Track Album or Recording of Score from Motion Picture or Television	Breakfast at Tiffany's: Music from the Motion Picture	Won	
1962	Best Instrumental Arrangement	"Baby Elephant Walk"	Won	
1962	Best Instrumental Theme	"Baby Elephant Walk"	Nominated	
1962	Best Original Jazz Composition	"The Sounds of Hatari!"	Nominated	
1962	Best Performance by an Orchestra or Instrumentalist with Orchestra – Primarily Not Jazz or for Dancing	Hatari! Music from the Paramount Motion Picture Score	Nominated	
1963	Record of the Year	"Days of Wine and Roses"	Won	
1963	Song of the Year	"Days of Wine and Roses"	Won	
1963	Best Background Arrangement (Behind Vocalist or Instrumentalist)	"Days of Wine and Roses"	Won	
1963	Best Performance by a Chorus	"Charade"	Nominated	
1963	Best Performance by an Orchestra or Instrumentalist with Orchestra – Primarily Not Jazz or for Dancing	Our Man in Hollywood	Nominated	
1964	Album of the Year	The Pink Panther	Nominated	
1964	Song of the Year	"Dear Heart"	Nominated	
1964	Best Performance by a Chorus	"Dear Heart"	Nominated	
1964	Best Instrumental Arrangement	"The Pink Panther Theme"	Won	
1964	Best Instrumental Composition (Other Than Jazz)	"The Pink Panther Theme"	Won	
1964	Best Instrumental Performance – Non-Jazz	"The Pink Panther Theme"	Won	
1964	Best Original Score Written for a Motion Picture or Television Show	The Pink Panther	Nominated	
1965	Best Instrumental Performance – Non-Jazz	The Great Race	Nominated	
1965	Best Performance by a Chorus	Dear Heart and Other Songs about Love	Nominated	
1966	Best Performance by a Chorus	Henry Mancini Presents the Academy Award Songs	Nominated	
1966	Best Instrumental Theme	"Arabesque"	Nominated	
1966	Best Instrumental Arrangement	"Arabesque"	Nominated	
1966	Best Original Score Written for a Motion Picture or Television Show	Arabesque	Nominated	
1969	Record of the Year	"Love Theme from Romeo and Juliet"	Nominated	
1969	Best Instrumental Arrangement	"Love Theme from Romeo and Juliet"	Won	
1969	Best Contemporary Instrumental Performance	"Love Theme from Romeo and Juliet"	Nominated	
1969	Best Original Score Written for a Motion Picture or a Television Special	Me, Natalie	Nominated	
1970	Best Instrumental Arrangement	"Theme from Z"	Won	
1970	Best Contemporary Instrumental Performance	"Theme from Z and Other Film Music"	Won	
1970	Best Instrumental Composition	"Love Theme from Sunflower"	Nominated	
1970	Best Original Score Written for a Motion Picture or a Television Special	Darling Lili	Nominated	
1971	Best Pop Instrumental Performance	"Theme from Love Story"	Nominated	
1972	Best Instrumental Arrangement	"Theme from The Mancini Generation"	Nominated	
1972	Best Instrumental Composition	"Brass on Ivory"	Nominated	
1972	Best Pop Instrumental Performance by an Arranger, Composer, Orchestra and/or Choral Leader	Brass on Ivory	Nominated	
1975	Album of Best Original Score Written for a Motion Picture or a Television Special	The Return of the Pink Panther	Nominated	
1976	Best Instrumental Arrangement	"The Disaster Movie Suite"	Nominated	
1976	Best Instrumental Composition	"The White Dawn"	Nominated	
1978	Album of Best Original Score Written for a Motion Picture or a Television Special	Revenge of the Pink Panther	Nominated	
1978	Best Pop Instrumental Performance	"The Pink Panther Theme ('78)"	Nominated	
1980	Best Pop Instrumental Performance	"Ravel's Boléro"	Nominated	
1982	Best Album of Original Score Written for a Motion Picture or Television Special	Victor/Victoria	Nominated	
1983	Best Instrumental Composition	"The Thorn Birds Theme"	Nominated	
1984	Best Arrangement on an Instrumental	"Cameo for Flute... For James"	Nominated	
1987	Best Instrumental Arrangement Accompanying Vocal(s)	"It Might as Well Be Spring"	Nominated	
1987	Best Instrumental Composition	"The Blues in Three"	Nominated	
1987	Best Album of Original Instrumental Background Score Written for a Motion Picture or Television	The Glass Menagerie	Nominated	
1988	Best Instrumental Arrangement Accompanying Vocal(s)	"Volare"	Nominated	
1988	Best Arrangement on an Instrumental	"Suite from The Thorn Birds"	Nominated	
1990	Best Arrangement on an Instrumental	"Monster Movie Music Suite"	Nominated	
1991	Best Arrangement on an Instrumental	"The Untouchables"	Nominated	
1995	Lifetime Achievement Award	—N/a	Won	
1999	Grammy Hall of Fame	"Moon River"	Inducted	
2001	Grammy Hall of Fame	The Pink Panther	Inducted	

=== Primetime Emmy Awards ===
Year	Category	Work	Result	Ref.
1959	Best Musical Contribution to a Television Program	Peter Gunn (for the theme song)	Nominated	
1983	Outstanding Achievement in Music Composition for a Limited Series or a Special (Dramatic Underscore)	The Thorn Birds (for "Part I")	Nominated	

== Miscellaneous awards ==
=== ASCAP Film and Television Music Awards ===
Year	Category	Nominated work	Result	Ref.
1986	Most Performed Feature Film Standards on TV	"Moon River" (from Breakfast at Tiffany's)	Won	
1986	Most Performed Theme		Won	
1987	Most Performed Theme		Won	
1988	Most Performed Feature Film Standards on TV	"The Pink Panther Theme" (from The Pink Panther)	Won	
1988	Most Performed Theme		Won	
1988	Lifetime Achievement Award		Won	
1989	Most Performed Theme		Won	
1991	Most Performed Theme		Won	
2007	Top Box Office Films	The Pink Panther	Won	

=== Golden Raspberry Awards ===
Year	Category	Nominated work	Result	Ref.
1980	Worst Original Song	"Where Do You Catch the Bus for Tomorrow?" (from A Change of Seasons)	Nominated	
1986	Worst Original Song	"Life in a Looking Glass" (from That's Life!)	Nominated	

=== International Film Music Critics Association Awards ===
Year	Category	Nominated work	Result	Ref.
2013	Best Archival Release of an Existing Score – Re-Release or Re-Recording	Breakfast at Tiffany's	Nominated	
2014	Best Archival Release of an Existing Score – Compilation	Henry Mancini: The Classic Soundtrack Collection	Nominated	
2021	Best New Archival Release – Compilation	The Pink Panther Final Chapters Collection	Nominated	
2022	Best New Archival Release	Frenzy	Won	

=== Laurel Awards ===
Year	Category	Nominated work	Result	Ref.
1961	Top Musical Score	Breakfast at Tiffany's	Nominated	
1961	Top Song	"Bachelor in Paradise" (from Bachelor in Paradise)	Nominated	
1961	Top Song	"Moon River" (from Breakfast at Tiffany's)	Won	
1962	Top Song	"Days of Wine and Roses" (from Days of Wine and Roses)	4th Place	
1963	Top Song	"Charade" (from Charade)	5th Place	
1964	Top Music Men		4th Place	
1964	Top Song	"Dear Heart" (from Dear Heart)	Nominated	
1965	Top Song	"The Sweetheart Tree" (from The Great Race)	5th Place	
1969	Top Music Men	Me, Natalie	Nominated	
1970	Best Composer	Darling Lili	4th Place	

=== Online Film & Television Association Awards ===
Year	Category	Contribution	Result	Ref.
1998	Film Hall of Fame: Support	Music	Inducted	

=== Palm Springs International Film Festival ===
Year	Category	Nominated work	Result	Ref.
1995	Frederick Loewe Award for Film Composing	—N/a	Won	

== Special honors ==
=== Academy of Achievement ===
Year	Honor	Result	Ref.
1989	Golden Plate Award	Inducted	

=== Hollywood Walk of Fame ===
Year	Honor	Result	Ref.
1982	Hollywood Walk of Fame	Inducted	

=== Songwriters Hall of Fame ===
Year	Honor	Result	Ref.
1984	Songwriters Hall of Fame	Inducted	

== Other honors ==
- 1997: Mancini was posthumously awarded an honorary doctorate of music from Berklee College of Music.
- 2004: On April 13, the United States Postal Service honored Mancini with a thirty-seven cent commemorative stamp. The stamp was painted by artist Victor Stabin and shows Mancini conducting in front of a list of some of his movie and TV themes.
