= Ted Nash (saxophonist, born 1922) =

American jazz saxophonist (1922–2011)

- Born: Theodore Malcolm Nash; October 31, 1922; Somerville, Massachusetts, U.S.
- Died: May 12, 2011 (aged 88) Carmel, California, U.S.
- Genres: Jazz; swing
- Occupation: Musician
- Instruments: Saxophone; flute; clarinet
- Years active: 1940s–1980s
- Formerly of: Les Brown big band; Jazz Composers Collective; Henry Mancini
- Relatives: Dick Nash (brother); Ted Nash (nephew, born 1960)

Theodore Malcolm Nash (October 31, 1922 – May 12, 2011) was a jazz musician who played the saxophone, flute, and clarinet. He was a session musician for studios in Hollywood. His brother is trombonist Dick Nash and his nephew is saxophonist Ted Nash, who is a member of the Jazz at Lincoln Center Orchestra led by Wynton Marsalis.

== Early life and career ==
Nash was born in the Boston suburb of Somerville, Massachusetts. Before he began playing saxophone in his early teens, his aspiration was to become a classical flautist. His professional career began when he went on the road with a succession of dance bands. In 1944, he became tenor saxophonist for the big band of Les Brown. With Brown, he played on the number one hits "Sentimental Journey" and "My Dreams Are Getting Better All the Time", both sung by Doris Day.

== Hollywood studios ==
In the late 1940s, after getting married, Nash settled in Los Angeles and became active as a session musician in the Hollywood movie and television studios. In 1956, he recorded with Paul Weston's orchestra on the album Day by Day, with vocals by his former colleague and close friend Doris Day.

He was the featured soloist on The Music from Peter Gunn soundtrack, performing the alto saxophone solo on the theme and on the second bridge of "Dreamsville". He was known for his mastery of the extreme altissimo register of the saxophone. He wrote Ted Nash's Studies in High Harmonics for Tenor and Alto Saxophone published in 1946.

Through the 1950s and 1960s, he worked as a sideman for June Christy, Nat King Cole, Bing Crosby, Billy Eckstine, Ella Fitzgerald, Frank Sinatra, and Nancy Wilson. During the 1970s, he worked with Judy Collins and Quincy Jones. He retired in the 1980s.

== Discography ==
=== As leader ===
- The Brothers Nash (Liberty, 1955)
- Star Eyes, The Artistry of Ted Nash (Columbia, 1956)
- Peter Gunn (Crown, 1959)

=== As sideman ===
With Georgie Auld

- In the Land of Hi-Fi with Georgie Auld and His Orchestra (EmArcy, 1955)

With Elmer Bernstein

- Sweet Smell of Success (Decca, 1957)
- Paris Swings (Capitol, 1960)

With Barney Kessel

- Music To Listen To Barney Kessel By (Contemporary, 1956)

With Henry Mancini

- The Music from Peter Gunn (RCA Victor, 1959) – soundtrack
- More Music from Peter Gunn (RCA Victor, 1959) – soundtrack
- The Mancini Touch (RCA Victor, 1960)
- The Blues and the Beat (RCA Victor, 1960)
- Music from Mr. Lucky (RCA Victor, 1960)
- Combo! (RCA Victor, 1961)
- Breakfast at Tiffany's (RCA Victor, 1961) – soundtrack
- Hatari! (RCA Victor, 1962) – soundtrack
- Our Man in Hollywood (RCA Victor, 1963)
- Uniquely Mancini (RCA Victor, 1963)
- Mancini '67 (RCA Victor, 1967)

With Pete Rugolo

- Behind Brigitte Bardot (Warner Bros., 1960)

With Lalo Schifrin

- Che! (Tetragrammaton, 1969)
