= Grammy Award for Best Performance by an Orchestra or Instrumentalist with Orchestra =

Award

The Grammy Award for Best Performance by an Orchestra or Instrumentalist with Orchestra - Primarily Not Jazz or for Dancing was awarded from 1959 to 1964. The award had several minor name changes:

- From 1959 to 1960 the award was known as Best Performance by an Orchestra
- In 1961 it was awarded as Best Performance by an Orchestra - for Other Than Dancing
- From 1962 to 1964 it has been awarded as Best Performance by an Orchestra or Instrumentalist with Orchestra - Primarily Not Jazz or for Dancing

This award was presented alongside the award for Best Performance by an Orchestra – for Dancing.

Years reflect the year in which the Grammy Awards were presented, for works released in the previous year.

== Recipients ==
Year	Winner(s)	Title	Nominees	Ref.
1959	Billy May	"Billy May's Big Fat Brass"	George Shearing for Burnished Brass; Buddy DeFranco for Cross Country Suite; Johnny Mandel for I Want to Live!; Jack Kane for Kane Is Able	
1960	David Rose & His Orchestra with André Previn	"Like Young"	Bob Thompson & Orchestra for Just for Kicks; Henry Mancini for More Music from Peter Gunn; Esquivel for Strings Aflame; Hugo Winterhalter for Two Sides of Winterhalter	
1961	Henry Mancini	"Mr. Lucky"	Count Basie for The Count Basie Story; Esquivel for Infinity in Sound; Gerry Mulligan for The Concert Jazz Band; Percy Faith for Theme from A Summer Place	
1962	Henry Mancini	"Breakfast at Tiffany's"	Gerry Mulligan for A Concert in Jazz; André Previn for A Touch of Elegance; Al Hirt for The Greatest Horn in the World; Stan Kenton for West Side Story	
1963	Peter Nero	"The Colorful Peter Nero"	Henry Mancini for Hatari!; Felix Slatkin for Hoedown!; Mr. Acker Bilk for Stranger on the Shore; Elmer Bernstein for Walk on the Wild Side	
1964	Al Hirt	"Java"	André Previn for André Previn in Hollywood; Peter Nero for Hail the Conquering Nero; Kai Winding for More; Henry Mancini for Our Man in Hollywood; Percy Faith for Themes for Young Lovers	
