= 3rd Annual Grammy Awards =

1961 US music awards ceremony

- Date: April 13, 1961
- Location: Los Angeles
- Hosted by: Lloyd Bridges
- Website: https://www.grammy.com/awards/3rd-annual-grammy-awards

Television/radio coverage
- Network: ABC

The 3rd Annual Grammy Awards were held on April 12, 1961, at Los Angeles and New York. They recognized musical accomplishments by the performers for the year 1960. Ray Charles won four awards and Bob Newhart and Henry Mancini each won three awards.

== Award winners ==
The following awards were given in the third award ceremony:

- Record of the Year
  - Percy Faith for "Theme from A Summer Place"
  - Frank Sinatra for "Nice 'N Easy"
  - Ella Fitzgerald for "Mack The Knife"
  - Ray Charles for "Georgia On My Mind"
  - Elvis Presley for "Are You Lonesome Tonight?"
- Album of the Year
  - Bob Newhart for The Button-Down Mind of Bob Newhart
  - Nat King Cole for Wild Is Love
  - Erich Leinsdorf (conductor) for Puccini Turandot
  - Frank Sinatra for Nice 'N Easy
  - Erich Leinsdorf (conductor) for Brahms: Concerto with Sviatoslav Richter (piano)
  - Harry Belafonte for Belafonte Returns To Carnegie Hall
- Song of the Year
  - Ernest Gold for "Theme of Exodus"
  - Max Steiner (songwriter) for "Theme From A Summer Place" performed by Percy Faith
  - Sammy Cahn & Jimmy Van Heusen (songwriters) for "Second Time Around" performed by Frank Sinatra
  - Alan Bergman, Marilyn (Keith) Bergman & Lew Spence (songwriters) for "Nice 'N Easy" performed by Frank Sinatra
  - Audrey Allison, Joe Allison & Charles Grean (songwriters) for "He'll Have To Go" performed by Jim Reeves
- Best New Artist
  - Bob Newhart
  - The Brothers Four
  - Joanie Sommers
  - Leontyne Price
  - Miriam Makeba

=== Children's ===
- Best Album Created for Children
  - Ross Bagdasarian Sr. for Let's All Sing With the Chipmunks performed by Ross Bagdasarian Sr. as "David Seville and the Chipmunks"
  - Ralph Bellamy for Stories And Songs Of The Civil War
  - Sterling Holloway for Mother Goose Nursery Rhymes
  - Pete Seeger for Folk Songs For Young People
  - Dr. Seuss for Dr. Seuss Presents Bartholomew And The Oobleck
  - Various Artists for Adventures In Music, Grade 3, Volume 1

=== Classical ===
- Best Classical Performance - Orchestra
  - Fritz Reiner (conductor) & the Chicago Symphony Orchestra for Bartók: Music for Strings, Percussion and Celesta
- Best Classical Performance - Vocal Soloist
  - Leontyne Price for A Program of Song - Leontyne Price Recital
- Best Classical Opera Production
  - Erich Leinsdorf (conductor), Birgit Nilsson, Giorgio Tozzi, Jussi Björling, Renata Tebaldi & the Rome Opera Orchestra for Puccini: Turandot
- Best Classical Performance - Choral (including oratorio)
  - Thomas Beecham (conductor) & the Royal Philharmonic Orchestra & Chorus for Handel: Messiah
- Best Classical Performance - Concerto or Instrumental Soloist
  - Erich Leinsdorf (conductor), Sviatoslav Richter & the Chicago Symphony Orchestra for Brahms: Piano Concerto No. 2 in B Flat
- Best Classical Performance - Instrumental Soloist or Duo (other than with orchestral accompaniment)
  - Laurindo Almeida for The Spanish Guitars of Laurindo Almeida
- Best Classical Performance - Vocal or Instrumental - Chamber Music
  - Laurindo Almeida for Conversations With the Guitar
- Best Contemporary Classical Composition
  - Aaron Copland (composer & conductor) & the Boston Symphony Orchestra for Orchestral Suite from The Tender Land Suite

=== Comedy ===
- Best Comedy Performance - Spoken Word
  - Bob Newhart for The Button-Down Mind Strikes Back!
  - Jonathan Winters for The Wonderful World Of Jonathan Winters
  - Shelley Berman for The Edge Of Shelley Berman
  - Carl Reiner & Mel Brooks for 2000 Year Old Man
- Best Comedy Performance - Musical
  - Jo Stafford & Paul Weston for Jonathan and Darlene Edwards in Paris performed by Jo Stafford & Paul Weston and as "Jonathan & Darlene Edwards"
  - Stan Freberg for The Old Payola Roll Blues
  - Homer And Jethro for Homer And Jethro At The Country Club
  - Tom Lehrer for An Evening Wasted With Tom Lehrer
  - David Seville And The Chipmunks for "Alvin For President"

=== Composing and arranging ===
- Best Sound Track Album or Recording of Music Score from Motion Picture or Television
  - Ernest Gold (composer) for Exodus
  - Nelson Riddle (composer) for The Untouchables performed by Nelson Riddle
  - Adolph Deutch (composer) for The Apartment performed by Various Artists
  - Henry Mancini (composer) for Mr. Lucky performed by Henry Mancini
  - Miklos Rozsa (composer) for Ben Hur performed by Miklos Rozsa
- Best Arrangement
  - Henry Mancini (arranger & artist) for Mr. Lucky
  - Dick Schory (arranger) for Wild Percussion And Horns A' Plenty performed by Dick Schory
  - Don Costa (arranger) for "Theme From The Apartment" performed by Ferrante & Teicher
  - Percy Faith (arranger) for "Theme From A Summer Place" performed by Percy Faith
  - Nelson Riddle (arranger) for "Nice 'N Easy" performed by Frank Sinatra
  - Quincy Jones (arranger) for "Let The Good Times Roll" performed by Ray Charles
  - Bill Holman (arranger) for "I'm Gonna Go Fishin'" performed by Gerry Mulligan
  - Billy May & George Shearing (arrangers) for "Honeysuckle Rose" performed by George Shearing

=== Country ===
- Best Country & Western Performance
  - Marty Robbins for "El Paso"
  - Ferlin Husky for Wing Of A Dove
  - Hank Locklin for Please Help Me, I'm Falling
  - Johnny Horton for "North To Alaska"
  - Jim Reeves for "He'll Have To Go"

=== Folk ===
- Best Performance - Folk
  - Harry Belafonte for "Swing Dat Hammer"
  - Alan Lomax for Southern Folk Heritage Series
  - Ewan MacColl for Songs Of Robert Burns
  - Jimmy Driftwood for Songs Of Billy Yank And Johnny Reb
  - Miriam Makeba for Miriam Makeba
  - The Kingston Trio for Here We Go Again
  - The Brothers Four for Greenfields
  - Belafonte Folk Singers for Cheers

=== Jazz ===
- Best Jazz Performance Solo or Small Group
  - André Previn for West Side Story
  - George Shearing for White Satin
  - Dizzy Gillespie And His Octet for The Greatest Trumpet Of Them All
  - Modern Jazz Quartet for Pyramid
  - Miles Davis for Jazz Track
  - Art Tatum for Greatest Piano Of Them All
  - Lambert, Hendricks And Ross for The Hottest New Group In Jazz
  - Duke Ellington & Johnny Hodges for Back To Back - Duke Ellington And Johnny Hodges Play The Blues
- Best Jazz Performance Large Group
  - Henry Mancini for Blues and the Beat
  - Quincy Jones for The Great Wide World Of Quincy Jones
  - Count Basie for The Count Basie Story
  - Miles Davis & Gil Evans for Sketches of Spain
  - Gerry Mulligan for "I'm Gonna Go Fishin'"
- Best Jazz Composition of More Than Five Minutes Duration
  - Gil Evans & Miles Davis for Sketches of Spain
  - Jimmy Giuffre (composer) for Western Suite performed by Jimmy Giuffre, Bob Brookmeyer & Jim Hall
  - John Lewis (composer) for "Sketch" performed by Modern Jazz Quartet & Guests
  - Maynard Ferguson (composer) for "Newport Suite" performed by Maynard Ferguson
  - Duke Ellington (composer) for Idiom '59 performed by Duke Ellington
  - Bob Brookmeyer (composer) for Blues Suite performed by Bob Brookmeyer
  - Dave Brubeck (composer) for "Blue Rondo A La Turk" performed by Dave Brubeck

=== Musical show ===
- Best Show Album (Original Cast)
  - Oscar Hammerstein II, Richard Rodgers (composers), Mary Martin & the original cast for The Sound of Music
  - Meredith Willson (composer), original cast including Tammy Grimes, Harve Presnell & Jack Harrold for The Unsinkable Molly Brown
  - Jerry Bock & Sheldon Harnick (composers), original cast including Tom Bosley for Fiorello!
  - Alan J. Lerner & Frederick Loewe (composers) for Camelot performed by Richard Burton, Julie Andrews & Robert Goulet
  - Lee Adams & Charles Strouse (composers) for Bye Bye Birdie performed by Chita Rivera, Dick Van Dyke & Paul Lynde
- Best Sound Track Album or Recording of Original Cast From a Motion Picture or Television
  - Cole Porter (composer), Frank Sinatra & the original cast for Can Can
  - Nelson Riddle (composer) for Li'l Abner performed by Nelson Riddle
  - Elvis Presley for G.I. Blues performed by Elvis Presley
  - Betty Comden, Adolph Green & Jule Styne (composers) for Bells Are Ringing performed by original cast including Judy Holliday & Dean Martin

=== Packaging and notes ===
- Best Album Cover
  - Marvin Schwartz (art director) for Latin a la Lee performed by Peggy Lee
  - Robert M. Jones (art director) for Wild Percussion And Horns A' Plenty performed by Dick Schory
  - Robert M. Jones (art director) for Tchaikovsky: Nutcracker Suite Excerpts performed by Fritz Reiner
  - Robert M. Jones (art director) for Stravinsky: Petrouchka performed by Pierre Monteux
  - Robert M. Jones (art director) for Prokofiev: Alexander Nevsky performed by Fritz Reiner
  - Irving Werbin (art director) for Now! Fred Astaire performed by Fred Astaire
  - Sheldon Marks (art director) for Ella Fitzgerald Sings The George And Ira Gershwin Song Book performed by Ella Fitzgerald
  - Robert M. Jones (art director) for Carlos Montoya performed by Carlos Montoya
  - Marvin Israel (art director) for Bean Bags performed by Milt Jackson

=== Pop ===
- Best Vocal Performance Single Record or Track, Female
  - Ella Fitzgerald for "Mack the Knife"
  - Doris Day for "Sound of Music"
  - Brenda Lee for "I'm Sorry"
  - Peggy Lee for "I'm Gonna Go Fishin'"
  - Eileen Farrell for "I Gotta Right To Sing The Blues"
- Best Vocal Performance Album, Female
  - Ella Fitzgerald for Mack the Knife - Ella in Berlin
  - Miriam Makeba for Miriam Makeba
  - Peggy Lee for Latin Ala Lee!
  - Della Reese for Della
  - Rosemary Clooney for Clap Hands, Here Comes Rosie
- Best Vocal Performance Single Record or Track, Male
  - Ray Charles for "Georgia on My Mind"
  - Frank Sinatra for "Nice 'N Easy"
  - Johnny Mathis for "Misty"
  - Jim Reeves for "He'll Have To Go"
  - Elvis Presley for "Are You Lonesome Tonight?"
- Best Vocal Performance Album, Male
  - Ray Charles for The Genius of Ray Charles
  - Nat King Cole for Wild Is Love
  - Frank Sinatra for Nice 'N Easy
  - Elvis Presley for G.I. Blues
  - Harry Belafonte for Belafonte Returns To Carnegie Hall
- Best Performance by a Vocal Group (2 to 6)
  - Eydie Gormé & Steve Lawrence for "We Got Us"
  - Swe-Danes for Scandinavian Shuffle
  - The Kingston Trio for Here We Go Again
  - The Brothers Four for "Greenfields"
  - The Hi-Los for All Over The Place
- Best Performance by a Chorus (7 or More Persons)
  - Norman Luboff for Songs of the Cowboy performed by the Norman Luboff Choir
  - Robert Shaw Chorale for That Wonderous Love
  - Pete King Chorale for "My Favorite Things"
  - Ray Charles Singers for Deep Night
  - Belafonte Folk Singers for Belafonte Returns To Carnegie Hall
- Best Performance by a Band for Dancing
  - Count Basie for Dance Along with Basie
  - Henry Mancini for The Blues And The Beat
  - Billy May for Girls And Boys On Broadway
  - Perez Prado for Big Hits By Prado
  - Les Brown for Bandland
- Best Performance by an Orchestra
  - Henry Mancini for Mr. Lucky
  - Percy Faith for "Theme From A Summer Place"
  - Count Basie for The Count Basie Story
  - Gerry Mulligan for The Concert Jazz Band
  - Esquivel for Infinity In Sound
- Best Performance by a Pop Single Artist
  - Ray Charles for "Georgia on My Mind"
  - Frank Sinatra for "Nice 'N Easy"
  - Ella Fitzgerald for "Mack The Knife"
  - Peggy Lee for "Heart"
  - Elvis Presley for "Are You Lonesome Tonight?"

=== Production and engineering ===
- Best Engineering Contribution - Popular Recording
  - Luis P. Valentin (engineer) for Ella Fitzgerald Sings the George and Ira Gershwin Songbook performed by Ella Fitzgerald
  - Robert Simpson (engineer) for Wild Percussion And Horns A' Plenty performed by Dick Schory
  - John Kraus (engineer) for Wild Is Love performed by Nat King Cole
  - Robert Fine (engineer) for Persuasive Percussion #2 performed by Terry Snyder And All The Stars
  - Luis P. Valentin for Louis Bellson Swings Jule Styne performed by Louis Bellson
  - John Norman (engineer) for Infinity In Sound performed by Esquivel
  - Robert Simpson (engineer) for Belafonte Returns To Carnegie Hall performed by Harry Belafonte
- Best Engineering Contribution - Classical Recording
  - Hugh Davies (engineer) & Laurindo Almeida for The Spanish Guitars of Laurindo Almeida
  - John Kraus (engineer) for The Two Pianos Of Leonard Pennario performed by Leonard Pennario
  - Lewis W. Layton (engineer) for R. Strauss: Don Quixote performed by Fritz Reiner
  - Lewis W. Layton (engineer) for Puccini Turandot performed by Erich Leinsdorf
  - Lewis W. Layton (engineer) for Berlioz: Requiem conducted by Charles Munch
  - Lewis W. Layton (engineer) for Bartók: Music For Strings, Percussion And Celeste conducted by Fritz Reiner
  - Lewis W. Layton (engineer) for Alexander Nevsky conducted by Fritz Reiner
- Best Engineering Contribution - Novelty Recording
  - John Kraus (engineer) for "The Old Payola Roll Blues" performed by Stan Freberg
  - Thorne Nogar (engineer) for Spike Jones In Hi-Fi performed by Spike Jones
  - John Crawford, Anthony Salvatore & Robert Simpson (engineers) for New Sounds America Loves Best performed by John Klein
  - George Fernandez (engineer) for "Mr. Custer" performed by Larry Verne
  - Ted Keep (engineer) for Let's All Sing With The Chipmunks performed by David Seville
  - John Kraus (engineer) for June Night performed by Jack Cookerly
  - Ted Keep (engineer) for "Alvin For President" performed by David Seville And The Chipmunks

=== R&B ===
- Best Rhythm & Blues Performance
  - Ray Charles for "Let the Good Times Roll"
  - Bo Diddley for "Walkin' And Talkin'"
  - John Lee Hooker for Travelin'
  - LaVern Baker for "Shake A Hand"
  - Jackie Wilson for "Lonely Teardrops"
  - Muddy Waters for "Got My Mojo Working"
  - Hank Ballard for "Finger Poppin' Time"
  - Etta James for "All I Could Do Was Cry"

=== Spoken ===
- Best Performance - Documentary or Spoken Word (other than comedy)
  - Robert Bialek (producer) for FDR Speaks
  - Henry Fonda for Voices Of The Twentieth Century
  - John Gielgud for Part Two Of Shakespeare's \"Ages Of Man\", \"One Man In This Time\
  - Archibald MacLeish for J.B.
