= 6th Annual Grammy Awards =

1964 US music awards ceremony

- Date: May 12, 1964
- Location: Chicago, Los Angeles and New York

Television/radio coverage
- Network: NBC

The 6th Annual Grammy Awards were held on May 12, 1964, at Chicago, Los Angeles and New York. They recognized accomplishments by musicians for the year 1963. Henry Mancini won 4 awards.

== Award winners ==
The following awards were the winners and nominees of the 6th annual awards ceremony:

- Record of the Year
  - Henry Mancini for "Days of Wine and Roses"
  - Jack Jones for "Wives And Lovers"
  - Tony Bennett for "I Wanna Be Around"
  - Barbra Streisand for "Happy Days Are Here Again"
  - Sœur Sourire for "Dominique"
- Album of the Year (other than classical)
  - Barbra Streisand for The Barbra Streisand Album
  - Sœur Sourire for The Singing Nun Album
  - Andy Williams for Days Of Wine And Roses
  - Al Hirt for Honey In The Horn
  - The Swingle Singers for Bach's Greatest Hits
- Song of the Year
  - Henry Mancini & Johnny Mercer (songwriters) for "Days of Wine and Roses" performed by Henry Mancini
  - Burt Bacharach & Hal David (songwriters) for "Wives And Lovers" performed by Jack Jones
  - Sacha Distal & Jack Reardon (songwriters) for "The Good Life" performed by Tony Bennett
  - Johnny Mercer & Sadie Vimmerstedt (songwriters) for "I Wanna Be Around" performed by Tony Bennett
  - Sammy Cahn & Jimmy Van Heusen (songwriters) for "Call Me Irresponsible" performed by Frank Sinatra
- Best New Artist
  - Ward Swingle (The Swingle Singers)
  - Vikki Carr
  - J's With Jamie
  - John Gary
  - Trini Lopez

=== Children's ===
- Best Recording for Children
  - Leonard Bernstein (conductor) for Bernstein Conducts for Young People performed by the New York Philharmonic
  - Jack Gilford for Winnie The Pooh
  - Peter, Paul and Mary for "Puff (The Magic Dragon)"
  - Tom Glazner for On Top Of Spaghetti
  - Various Artists for Let's Go To The Zoo
  - Pete Seeger for Children's Concert
  - Rica Owen Moore for Addition And Subtraction

=== Classical ===
- Best Classical Performance - Orchestra
  - Erich Leinsdorf (conductor) & the Boston Symphony Orchestra for Bartók: Concerto for Orchestra
- Best Classical Performance - Vocal Soloist (with or without orchestra)
  - Skitch Henderson (conductor), Leontyne Price & the RCA Orchestra for Great Scenes From Gershwin's Porgy and Bess
- Best Opera Recording
  - Erich Leinsdorf (conductor), Rosalind Elias, Leontyne Price, Richard Tucker & the RCA Italiana Opera Orchestra for Puccini: Madama Butterfly
- Best Classical Performance - Choral (other than opera)
  - Benjamin Britten (conductor), Edward Chapman, David Willcocks (choir directors), the Bach Choir, Highgate School Choir & the London Symphony Orchestra & Choir for Britten: War Requiem
- Best Classical Performance - Instrumental Soloist or Soloists (with orchestra)
  - Erich Leinsdorf (conductor), Arthur Rubinstein & the Boston Symphony Orchestra for Tchaikovsky: Piano Concerto No. 1 in B Flat Minor
- Best Classical Performance - Instrumental Soloist or Duo (without orchestra)
  - Vladimir Horowitz for The Sound of Horowitz
- Best Classical Music Performance - Chamber Music
  - Julian Bream for Evening of Elizabethan Music performed by the Julian Bream Consort
- Best Classical Composition by a Contemporary Composer
  - Benjamin Britten (composer & conductor) & the London Symphony Orchestra for Britten: War Requiem
- Best Classical Album
  - Benjamin Britten (conductor) & the London Symphony Orchestra for Britten: War Requiem
- Most Promising New Classical Recording Artist
  - André Watts

=== Comedy ===
- Best Comedy Performance
  - Allan Sherman for "Hello Mudduh, Hello Faddah"
  - The Smothers Brothers for Think Ethnic
  - Cassius Clay for I Am The Greatest
  - Carl Reiner & Mel Brooks for Carl Reiner And Mel Brooks At The Cannes Film Festival
  - Bill Cosby for Bill Cosby Is A Very Funny Fellow, Right!

=== Composing and arranging ===
- Best Instrumental Theme
  - Riz Ortolani (composer) for "More - Theme From Mondo Cane"
  - Bob Goldstein & David Shire for Washington Square performed by The Village Stompers
  - Maurice Jarre (composer & musical director) for Lawrence Of Arabia
  - Steve Allen & Ray Brown (composers) for Gravy Waltz
  - Jean "Toots" Theilmans (composer & performer) for "Bluesette"
- Best Original Score from a Motion Picture or Television Show
  - John Addison (composer) for Tom Jones
  - Nino Oliviero & Roy Ortolani (composers) for Mondo Cane conducted by Riz Ortolani
  - Maurice Jarre (composer & conductor) for Lawrence Of Arabia
  - Alex North (composer & conductor) for Cleopatra
- Best Instrumental Arrangement
  - Quincy Jones (arranger) for "I Can't Stop Loving You" performed by Count Basie
  - Joe Sherman (arranger) for Washington Square performed by The Village Stompers
  - Marty Gold & Peter Nero (arrangers) for "Mountain Greenery" performed by Peter Nero
  - Claus Ogerman (arranger) for "More" performed by Kai Winding
  - Robert N. Enevoldsen (arranger) for "Gravy Waltz" performed by Steve Allen
- Best Background Arrangement
  - Henry Mancini (arranger) for "Days of Wine and Roses"
  - Pete King (arranger) for "Wives And Lovers" performed by Jack Jones
  - Gerald Wilson (arranger) for "Tell Me The Truth" performed by Nancy Wilson
  - Nelson Riddle (arranger) for "Call Me Irresponsible" performed by Frank Sinatra
  - Benny Carter (arranger) for "Busted" performed by Ray Charles
  - Marion Evans (arranger) for "Blame It On The Bossa Nova" performed by Eydie Gorme

=== Country ===
- Best Country & Western Recording
  - Bobby Bare for "Detroit City"
  - Porter Wagoner for The Porter Wagoner Show
  - Lefty Frizzell for "Saginaw, Michigan"
  - Johnny Cash for "Ring Of Fire"
  - Hank Snow for "Ninety Miles An Hour (Down A Dead End Street)"
  - Buck Owens for "Love's Gonna Live Here"
  - Flatt and Scruggs for Flatt And Scruggs At Carnegie Hall

=== Folk ===
- Best Folk Recording
  - Peter, Paul and Mary for "Blowin' in the Wind"
  - Pete Seeger for "We Shall Overcome"
  - The Rooftop Singers for Walk Right In
  - Miriam Makeba for The World Of Miriam Makeba
  - Odetta for Odetta Sings Folk Songs
  - Judy Collins for Judy Collins #3
  - The New Christy Minstrels for "Green, Green"

=== Gospel ===
- Best Gospel or Other Religious Recording (Musical)
  - Soeur Sourire for "Dominique"
  - The Roger Wagner Chorale & Tennessee Ernie Ford for The Story Of Christmas
  - George Beverly Shea for The Earth Is The Lord's (And The Fullness Thereof)
  - Kings Of Harmony for "Steppin' Right In"
  - Bessie Griffin and The Gospel Pearls for Recorded Live!
  - Charles Magnuson & Fred Bock for Piano In Concert
  - The Limeliters for Make A Joyful Noise

=== Jazz ===
- Best Instrumental Jazz Performance - Soloist or Small Group
  - Bill Evans for Conversations with Myself
  - Miles Davis for Seven Steps To Heaven
  - Peter Nero for Peter Nero In Person
  - Al Hirt for Our Man In New Orleans
  - Dave Brubeck Quartet for Dave Brubeck At Carnegie Hall
  - Thelonious Monk for Criss-Cross
  - Ray Brown, Andre Previn, Herb Ellis & Shelly Manne for 4 To Go!
- Best Instrumental Jazz Performance - Large Group
  - Woody Herman for Encore: Woody Herman, 1963
  - Miles Davis for Seven Steps To Heaven
  - Quincy Jones for Quincy Jones Plays The Hip Hits
  - Al Hirt for Our Man In New Orleans
  - Gerry Mulligan Concert Jazz Band for Gerry Mulligan '63
  - Oliver Nelson Orchestra for Full Nelson
- Best Original Jazz Composition
  - Steve Allen & Ray Brown (composers) for "Gravy Waltz" performed by Steve Allen
  - Paul Desmond (composer & performer) for Take Ten
  - Antonio Carlos Jobim & Newton Mendonça (composers) for "Meditation" performed by Antonio Carlos Jobim
  - Dick Grove, Pete Jolly & Tommy Wolf (composers) for "Little Bird" performed by Pete Jolly
  - Kenyon Hopkins (composer & conductor) for East Side - West Side
  - Charlie Mingus (composer & performer) for "Black Saint And The Sinner Lady"

=== Musical show ===
- Best Score From an Original Cast Show Album
  - Jerry Bock, Sheldon Harnick (composers) & the original cast (Barbara Cook, Jack Cassidy, Barbara Baxley, Daniel Massey, Nathaniel Frey, Ralph Williams & Jo Wilder) for She Loves Me
  - Anne Croswell & Lee Pockriss (composers) for Tovarich performed by original Broadway cast including Vivien Leigh, Jean Pierre Aumont & George S. Irving
  - Howard Dietz & Arthur Schwartz (composers) for Jennie performed by original Broadway cast including George D. Wallace and Robin Bailey
  - Meredith Willson (composer) for Here's Love performed by original Broadway cast including Valerie Lee, Janis Paige & Laurence Naismith
  - Tom Jones & Harvey Schmidt (composers) for 110 In The Shade performed by original Broadway cast including Robert Horton and Inga Swenson

=== Packaging and notes ===
- Best Album Cover - Classical
  - Robert M. Jones (art director) for Puccini: Madama Butterfly conducted by Erich Leinsdorf
  - Robert "Bob" Cato (art director) for Strauss: Don Quixote conducted by Eugene Ormandy
  - Dorle Soria (art director) for Puccini: Tosca conducted by Herbert von Karajan
  - Vladimir Bobri (art director) for Granada (Albeniz: "Granada" Granados: "Spanish Dance In E" Ponce, Tansman, Aguado: "Eight Lesson For The Guitar" Sor: "Four Studies") performed by Andrés Segovia
  - Dorle Soria (art director) for Evening Of Elizabethan Music performed by Julian Bream Consort
  - Robert M. Jones (art director) for Beethoven: Symphony No. 6 In F Major, Op. 68 (Pastorale) conducted by Fritz Reiner
  - John Berg (art director) for Beethoven: Symphony No. 5 In C Minor, Op. 67 conducted by Leonard Bernstein
- Best Album Cover - Other Than Classical
  - John Berg for The Barbra Streisand Album performed by Barbra Streisand
  - John Murello (art director) for Night Train performed by Oscar Peterson
  - Robert M. Jones (art director) for Honey In The Horn performed by Al Hirt
  - Jim Silke (art director) for Hollywood - My Way performed by Nancy Wilson
  - Ed Thrasher (art director) for Carl Reiner And Mel Brooks At The Cannes Film Festival performed by Carl Reiner & Mel Brooks
  - Jim Ladwig (art director) for Bach's Greatest Hits performed by Swingle Singers
  - Robert M. Jones (art director) for Aloha From Norman Luboff performed by Norman Luboff Choir
- Best Album Notes
  - Stanley Dance & Leonard Feather (notes writers) for The Ellington Era performed by Duke Ellington
  - Edward Albee & Harold Clurman (notes writers) for Who's Afraid Of Virginia Woolf? performed by original cast including Uta Hagen, Arthur Hill, Melinda Dillon & George Grizzard
  - Harold Arlen (notes writer) for The Barbra Streisand Album performed by Barbra Streisand
  - B.A. Botkin, James L. Horan, Harold Preece & Sylvester L. Vigilante (notes writers) for The Badmen performed by Pete Seeger and others
  - Bob Bollard (notes writer) for The Amazing Amanda Ambrose performed by Amanda Ambrose
  - Sidney Bock (notes writer) for Evening Of Elizabethan Music performed by Julian Bream

=== Pop ===
- Best Vocal Performance, Female
  - Barbra Streisand for The Barbra Streisand Album
  - Miriam Makeba for The World of Miriam Makeba
  - Peggy Lee for I'm a Woman
  - Sœur Sourire for "Dominique"
  - Eydie Gormé for "Blame It on the Bossa Nova"
- Best Vocal Performance, Male
  - Jack Jones for "Wives and Lovers"
  - Andy Williams for "Days of Wine and Roses"
  - Tony Bennett for "I Wanna Be Around"
  - John Gary for Catch A Rising Star
  - Ray Charles for "Busted"
- Best Performance by a Vocal Group
  - Peter, Paul and Mary for "Blowin' in the Wind"
  - Anita Kerr Singers for Waitin' For The Evening Train
  - The Hi-Lo's for The Hi-Lo's Happen To The Bossa Nova
  - Jackie and Roy for Like Sing - Jackie And Roy Kral
  - The J's with Jamie for Hey, Look Us Over!
- Best Performance by a Chorus
  - Ward Swingle for Bach's Greatest Hits performed by the Swingle Singers
  - Robert Shaw Chorale for The Many Moods Of Christmas
  - Leonard Bernstein & Richard Conde for The Joy Of Christmas
  - The New Christy Minstrels for "Green, Green"
  - Henry Mancini and His Orchestra with Chorus for Charade
- Best Performance by an Orchestra - for Dancing
  - Count Basie for This Time by Basie! Hits of the 50s and 60s
  - Page Cavanaugh for The Page 7... An Explosion In Pop Music
  - Les Brown for Richard Rodgers Bandbook
  - Quincy Jones for Quincy Jones Plays the Hip Hits
  - Joe Harnell for Fly Me To The Moon And The Bossa Nova Pops
  - Woody Herman for Encore: Woody Herman 1963
- Best Performance by an Orchestra or Instrumentalist with Orchestra, Not for Jazz or Dancing
  - Al Hirt for "Java"
  - Percy Faith for Themes For Young Lovers
  - Kai Winding for "More"
  - Peter Nero for Hail The Conquering Nero
  - Henry Mancini for Our Man in Hollywood
  - André Previn for Andre Previn In Hollywood
- Best Rock and Roll Recording
  - April Stevens & Nino Tempo for "Deep Purple"
  - Chet Atkins for Teen Scene
  - Ruby and the Romantics for "Our Day Will Come"
  - Lesley Gore for "It's My Party"
  - Little Peggy March for "I Will Follow Him"
  - Sam Cooke for "Another Saturday Night"

=== Production and engineering ===
- Best Engineered Recording - Other Than Classical
  - James Malloy (engineer) for Charade performed by Henry Mancini
  - Frank Laico (engineer) for The Second Barbra Streisand Album performed by Barbra Streisand
  - Anthony Salvatore (engineer) for The Many Moods Of Christmas performed by Robert Shaw Chorale
  - Frank Laico (engineer) for The Barbra Streisand Album performed by Barbra Streisand
  - Ronald A. Steele (engineer) for Supercussion performed by Dick Schory
  - Ronald A. Steele (engineer) for Politely Percussive performed by Dick Schory
  - Al Schmitt (engineer) for Our Man In Hollywood performed by Henry Mancini
  - Harold Chapman (engineer) for Exotic Sounds Of Bail performed by Mantle Hood
  - Luis P. "Val" Valentin (engineer) for Ella And Basie! performed by Ella Fitzgerald & Count Basie
- Best Engineered Recording - Classical
  - Lewis W. Layton (engineer), Erich Leinsdorf (conductor) & the RCA Italiana Opera Orchestra for Puccini: Madama Butterfly
  - Gordon Parry (engineer) for Wagner: Siegfried conducted by Georg Solti
  - Lewis W. Layton for Mahler: Symphony No. 1 In D (The Titan Album) conducted by Erich Leinsdorf
  - Lewis W. Layton for Great Scenes From Gershwin's Porgy And Bess conducted by Skitch Henderson
  - Kenneth Wilkinson (engineer) for Britten: War Requiem conducted by Benjamin Britten
  - Fred Plaut (engineer) for Bernstein Conducts Tchaikovsky (Capriccio Italien; 1812 Overture; Marche Slave) conducted by Leonard Bernstein
- Best Engineered Recording - Special or Novel Effects
  - Robert Fine (engineer) for Civil War Vol. II performed by Frederick Fennell
  - John Kraus (engineer) for Zounds! What Sounds performed by Dean Elliott
  - Phil Macy & Al Weintraub (engineers) for Pepino's Friend Pasquale performed by Lou Monte
  - Hugh Davies & John Kraus (engineers) for Heartstrings performed by Dean Elliott
  - Bill MacMeekin & Scotty Shackner (engineers) for Four In The Floor performed by The Shut Downs
  - William Hamilton (engineer) for Fast, Fast, Fast Relief From TV Commercials performed by Bill McFadden & Bryna Rayburn
  - John Kraus (engineer) for Cheyenne Frontier Days performed by Hank Thompson

=== R&B ===
- Best Rhythm & Blues Recording
  - Ray Charles for "Busted"
  - Lenny Welch for "Since I Fell For You"
  - Little Johnny Taylor for "Part Time Love"
  - Major Lance for "Hey, Little Girl"
  - Barbara Lewis for "Hello Stranger"
  - Sam Cooke for "Frankie And Johnny"
  - Martha and the Vandellas for "(Love Is Like A) Heat Wave"

=== Spoken ===
- Best Documentary, Spoken Word or Drama Recording (other than comedy)
  - Edward Albee (playwright) for Who's Afraid of Virginia Woolf? performed by Melinda Dillon, George Grizzard, Uta Hagen & Arthur Hill
  - Martin Luther King Jr. and various artists for We Shall Overcome (The March On Washington... August 28, 1963)
  - Pete Seeger and others for The Badmen
  - Betty Field, Jane Fonda, Ben Gazzara, Pat Hingle, Geoff Horne, William Prince, Geraldine Page, Richard Thomas & Franchot Tone for Strange Interlude
  - John F. Kennedy for John F. Kennedy - The Presidential Years (With David Tieg As Narrator)
