= Grammy Award for Best Country & Western Recording =

Music award category

The Grammy Award for Best Country & Western Recording was awarded from 1959 to 1968. From 1959 to 1961 the award was presented as the Grammy Award for Best Country & Western Performance. 1965 and 1966 the award category was called Best Country & Western Single. This award was the lone country music Grammy category from 1959 to 1964.

Years reflect the year in which the Grammy Awards were presented, for works released in the previous year.

== Recipients ==
Year	Winner(s)	Title	Nominees	Ref.
1959	The Kingston Trio	"Tom Dooley"	Everly Brothers for "All I Have to Do Is Dream"; Everly Brothers for "Bird Dog"; Don Gibson for "Oh Lonesome Me"; Jimmie Rodgers for "Oh-Oh, I'm Falling In Love Again"	
1960	Johnny Horton	"The Battle of New Orleans"	Don Gibson for "Don't Tell Me Your Troubles"; Jim Reeves for "Home"; Skeeter Davis for "Set Him Free"; Eddy Arnold for "Tennessee Stud"	
1961	Marty Robbins	"El Paso"	Jim Reeves for "He'll Have to Go"; Johnny Horton for "North to Alaska"; Hank Locklin for "Please Help Me, I'm Falling"; Ferlin Husky for "Wings of a Dove"	
1962	Jimmy Dean	"Big Bad John"	Burl Ives for "A Little Bitty Tear"; Faron Young for "Hello Walls"; Leroy Van Dyke for "Walk On By"; Tex Ritter for "Hillbilly Heaven"	
1963	Burl Ives	"Funny Way of Laughin'"	Claude King for "Wolverton Mountain"; George Jones for "She Thinks I Still Care"; Jimmy Dean for "PT-109"; Johnny Tillotson for "It Keeps Right On a-Hurtin'"; Marty Robbins for "Devil Woman"	
1964	Bobby Bare	"Detroit City"	Buck Owens for "Love's Gonna Live Here"; Flatt and Scruggs for "Flatt and Scruggs at Carnegie Hall"; Hank Snow for "Ninety Miles an Hour (Down a Dead End Street)"; Johnny Cash for "Ring of Fire"; Lefty Frizzell for "Saginaw, Michigan"; Porter Wagoner for "The Porter Wagoner Show"	
1965	Roger Miller	"Dang Me"	Bobby Bare for "Four Strong Winds"; Connie Smith for "Once a Day"; Dottie West for "Here Comes My Baby"; Sonny James for "You're the Only World I Know"	
1966	Roger Miller	"King of the Road"	Chet Atkins for "Yakety Axe"; Eddy Arnold for "Make the World Go Away"; Jim Reeves for "Is It Really Over?"; Little Jimmy Dickens for "May the Bird of Paradise Fly Up Your Nose"; The Statler Brothers for "Flowers on the Wall"	
1967	David Houston	"Almost Persuaded"	Jack Greene for "There Goes My Everything"; Jeannie Seely for "Don't Touch Me"; Jim Reeves for "Distant Drums"; Leroy Pullins for "I'm a Nut"	
1968	Glen Campbell	"Gentle On My Mind"	Charley Pride for "Does My Ring Hurt Your Finger"; Jim Ed Brown for "Pop a Top"; Porter Wagoner for "The Cold Hard Facts of Life"; Tompall & the Glaser Brothers for "Through the Eyes of Love"	
