= Grammy Award for Best Performance by an Orchestra – for Dancing =

Music award category

The Grammy Award for Best Performance by an Orchestra - for Dancing was awarded from 1959 to 1964. The award had several minor name changes:

- From 1959 to 1960 the award was known as Best Performance by a Dance Band
- In 1961 it was awarded as Best Performance by a Band for Dancing
- From 1962 to 1964 it has been awarded as Best Performance by an Orchestra - for Dancing

This award was presented alongside the award for Best Performance by an Orchestra or Instrumentalist with Orchestra - Primarily Not Jazz or for Dancing.

Years reflect the year in which the Grammy Awards were presented, for works released in the previous year.

== Recipients ==
Year	Winner(s)	Title	Nominees	Ref.
1959	Count Basie	"Basie"	Jonah Jones for Baubles, Bangles and Beads; Perez Prado for Patricia; Warren Covington & the Tommy Dorsey Orchestra for Tea for Two Cha Cha; Ray Anthony for The Music from Peter Gunn	
1960	Duke Ellington	"Anatomy of a Murder"	Count Basie for Breakfast Dance and Barbecue; Glenn Miller for For the Very First Time; Larry Elgart for New Sounds at the Roosevelt; Perez Prado for Pops and Prado	
1961	Count Basie	"Dance Along with Basie"	Les Brown for Bandland; Perez Prado for Big Hits by Prado; Billy May for Girls and Boys on Broadway; Henry Mancini for The Blues and the Beat	
1962	Si Zentner	"Up A Lazy River"	Lawrence Welk for Calcutta; Quincy Jones for I Dig Dancers; Henry Mancini for Mr. Lucky Goes Latin; Glen Gray, Billy May for Shall We Swing?; Les Brown for The Lerner and Loewe Bandbook	
1963	Joe Harnell	"Fly Me to the Moon Bossa Nova"	Stan Getz, Gary McFarland for Big Band Bossa Nova; Quincy Jones for Big Band Bossa Nova; Neal Hefti for Jazz Pops; David Rose for The Stripper; Laurindo Almeida for Viva Bossa Nova!	
1964	Count Basie	"This Time by Basie!"	Woody Herman for Encore Woody Herman-1963; Joe Harnell for Fly Me to the Moon and the Bossa Nova Pops; Quincy Jones for Quincy Jones Plays the Hip Hits; Les Brown for Richard Rodgers Bandbook; Page Cavanaugh for The Page 7 ...An Explosion in Pop Music	
