= Combo! =

Studio album by Henry Mancini
- Released: 1962
- Recorded: June 14, 17, 22, 1960
- Studio: RCA Victor Music Center of the World, Hollywood, California
- Genre: Jazz
- Length: 36:31
- Label: RCA Victor
- Producer: Dick Peirce

Henry Mancini chronology
Mr. Lucky Goes Latin (1961)	Combo! (1962)	Our Man in Hollywood (1963)

Combo! was Henry Mancini's seventh studio LP for RCA Victor Records. Although recorded in 1960, it was not released until early 1962.

== Origin and concept ==
Combo! was recorded in June 1960 at RCA Victor's Music Center of the World in Hollywood, California. The liner notes observed that the contribution of the small band or "combo" to the "golden musical decade" from 1935 to 1945 is too frequently overlooked. Combo! was designed to recognize the contribution of that ensemble to the musical scene, with "fresh, musical and creative" jazz, written and improvised. Mancini incorporated the harpsichord into the musical concept for Combo!, its "sheer texture" said to provide a "fresh and appealing sound."

Combo! was described as arranger Mancini's challenge to "make eleven players sound like a full balanced orchestra and do justice to the songs as well." The resulting harmonies "had a truly modernist feel to them;" the soloists "locked into a firm geometry as striking and detached as a Cubist painting.

== Critical reviews and chart performance ==
Billboard magazine placed Combo! among its Spotlight Albums of the Week, characterizing it as "on the order of a salute to great pop combos of other years," with arrangements that "swing in Mancini's own current style."

Combo! spent 14 weeks on the Billboard Top LPs chart of best selling stereo LPs, topping out at #28 in March 1962.

== Track listing ==
Track	Title	Composers	Time
1	Moanin'	Timmons	2:50
2	Sidewalks of Cuba	Oakland, Parish, Mills	3:22
3	Dream of You	Oliver	2:54
4	Swing Lightly	Mancini	4:15
5	Castle Rock	Drake, Shirl, Sears	2:31
6	A Powdered Wig	Mancini	2:35
7	Playboy's Theme	Coleman	2:55
8	Tequila	Rio	2:35
9	Far East Blues	Mancini	3:26
10	Charleston Alley	Henderson, Kirkland	3:10
11	Scandinavian Shuffle	Asmussen	2:37
12	Everybody Blow!	Mancini	3:21

== Personnel ==
- Pete Candoli – trumpet
- Dick Nash – trombone
- Ted Nash – alto sax and C-flute
- Art Pepper – clarinet
- Ronny Lang – baritone sax and alto flute
- Johnny Williams – piano and harpsichord
- Bob Bain – guitar and bass guitar
- Rollie Bundock – bass
- Larry Bunker – vibes and marimba
- Ramon Rivera – conga
- Shelly Manne – drums

Production

- Dick Peirce – producer
- Al Schmitt – engineer
