= Dick Nash =

American jazz trombonist (born 1928)

- Born: Richard Taylor Nash; January 26, 1928 (age 98); Boston, Massachusetts, U.S.
- Genres: Jazz; swing; big band
- Occupation: Musician
- Instrument: Trombone
- Years active: 1947–2000s
- Formerly of: Henry Mancini; The Wrecking Crew
- Relatives: Ted Nash (brother, 1922–2011); Ted Nash (son, born 1960)

Richard Taylor Nash (born January 26, 1928) is an American jazz trombonist most associated with the swing and big band genres.

== Biography ==
He was born in Boston, Massachusetts, and began playing brass instruments at age ten. After his parents died, he grew more interested in music, and he was sent to Kurn Hattin Homes for Children in Vermont. At Kurn Hattin Homes, the first instruments he studied were the trumpet and bugle. His first professional work came in 1947 with bands such as that of Tex Beneke. He served in the California National Guard from 1950 to 1952, playing in a band there.

After his discharge from the military, he went back to Boston, where he attended Berklee College of Music. He then joined Billy May's band. Later, he became a first-call studio musician in Los Angeles, California. He was composer, and as Henry Mancini's favorite trombonist, was featured soloist on several Mancini soundtracks, beginning with Mr. Lucky and Peter Gunn. Nash's trombone is featured on the Theme From Hatari! from the soundtrack for the John Wayne film (1962), Breakfast at Tiffany's (1961), and Days of Wine and Roses. In 1959, he played bass trombone on Art Pepper + Eleven – Modern Jazz Classics.

His brother was the saxophonist Ted Nash (1922–2011) and he has three children: Ted, also a saxophonist, Nikki, and Bill.

== Discography ==
With Louie Bellson
- Louie Bellson's 7 (1976)
- Live at Concord Summer Festival (1995)

With Tex Beneke

- Dancers Delight (1996)
- Music in the Miller Mood (2000)

With Juan García Esquivel

- Four Corners of the World (1958)
- Other Worlds Other Sounds (1958)

With Erroll Garner

- Close-Up in Swing (1961)
- You Brought a New Kind of Love (1963)
- Night at the Movies Up in Erroll's (1999)

With Quincy Jones

- Roots (A&M, 1977)

With Henry Mancini

- The Music from Peter Gunn (1959)
- The Music from Mr. Lucky (1960)
- The Blues and the Beat (1960)
- The Mancini Touch (1960)
- Combo! (1962)
- Uniquely Mancini (1963)
- Concert Sound of Henry Mancini (1964)
- Latin Sound of Henry Mancini (1965)
- Big Latin Band of Henry Mancini (1968)
- Theme from Z and Other Film Music (1970)
- Lincoln Mayorga & Distinguished (1974)
- Symphonic Soul (1975)
- Cop Show Themes (1976)
- Theme Scene (1978)
- Big Band Sounds (2000)

With Ted Nash

- Peter Gunn (Crown, 1959)

With Anita O'Day

- Jazz 'Round Midnight (1954)
- Trav'lin' Light (1961)

With Oscar Peterson

- Bursting Out with the All-Star Big Band! (1962)
- Swinging Brass (1996)

With Pete Rugolo

- Rugolo Plays Kenton (EmArcy, 1958)
- 10 Trombones Like 2 Pianos (Mercury, 1960)
- The Original Music of Thriller (Time, 1961)

With Lalo Schifrin

- Music from Mission: Impossible (Dot, 1967)
- More Mission: Impossible (Paramount, 1968)
- Mannix (Paramount, 1968)
- Kelly's Heroes (MGM, 1970) – soundtrack
- Enter the Dragon (Warner Bros., 1973) – soundtrack

With others

- Ray Anthony, Jam Session at the Tower (1956)
- Teresa Brewer, 16 Most Requested Songs (1977)
- Les Brown, Anything Goes (1990)
- Salvador Camarata, Tutti's Trombones (1983)
- Paul Chihara, King of the Olympics
- Nat King Cole, Billy May Sessions (1951)
- Sonny Criss, Sonny's Dream (Birth of the New Cool) (Prestige, 1968)
- Randy Crawford, Everything Must Change (1976)
- Michael Davis, Brass Nation (2000)
- Larry Elgart, Latin Obsession (Sony, 2000)
- Don Ellis, Music from Other Galaxies and Planets (1977)
- Percy Faith, The Beatles Album (1970)
- Pete Fountain, South Rampart Street Parade (1963)
- Rudiger Gleisberg, Arabesque
- Julio Iglesias, 1100 Bel Air Place (1984)
- Harry James, Harry James in Hi-Fi (1955)
- Stan Kenton, Hair (Capitol, 1969)
- Peggy Lee, Blues Cross Country (1962)
- Melissa Manchester, Help Is on the Way (1976)
- The Manhattan Transfer, The Christmas Album (1992)
- Barry Manilow, Showstoppers (1991)
- Julia Migenes, Smile (Tribute to Hollywood)
- New England Conservatory, Red Back Book / Elite Syncopations (1992)
- The Palladium Orchestra, Big Band Latin Heat (1998)
- Art Pepper, Art Pepper + Eleven – Modern Jazz Classics (1959)
- Jean-Pierre Rampal, 'Fascinating' Rampal (1994)
- Sue Raney, In Good Company (1990)
- Kenny Rogers, Timepiece (1994)
- Shorty Rogers, Chances Are It Swings (RCA Victor, 1958)
- Don Swan, Hot Cha Cha
- Mel Tormé, Finest Hour (2001)
- Jimmy Witherspoon, Jazz Me Blues (1998)

== Soundtracks ==
- Breakfast at Tiffany's (1961)
- Charade (1963)
- Days of Wine and Roses (1962)
- Hatari! (1962) – featured soloist on "Theme from Hatari!"
- The Bingo Long Traveling All-Stars & Motor Kings (1976)
- Roots (1977)
- King of the Olympics (1988)
- Sabrina (1995)
- Planet of the Apes (2001)
