= 1st Annual Grammy Awards =

1959 US music awards ceremony

- Date: May 4, 1959
- Location: Beverly Hilton Hotel, Beverly Hills, California, and Park Sheraton Hotel, New York, New York
- Hosted by: Mort Sahl

Television/radio coverage
- Network: NBC

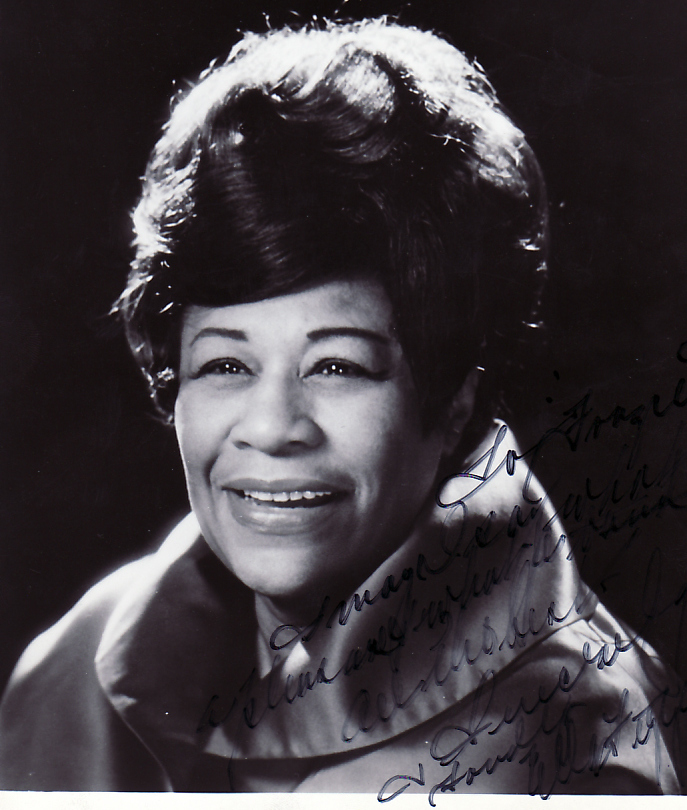
Ella Fitzgerald won two awards at the 1st Annual Grammy Awards.

The 1st Annual Grammy Awards, which began as The Gramophone Awards, were held on May 4, 1959. They recognized musical accomplishments by performers for the year 1958. Two separate ceremonies were held simultaneously on the same day: one in the Beverly Hilton Hotel in Beverly Hills, California, and the other in the Park Sheraton Hotel in New York City. Ella Fitzgerald, Count Basie, Domenico Modugno, Ross Bagdasarian, and Henry Mancini, each won 2 awards.

== Award winners ==
The following awards were given in the first award ceremony:

=== General ===
Record of the Year

- "Nel Blu Dipinto di Blu (Volare)" – Domenico Modugno
- "Catch a Falling Star" – Perry Como
- "Fever" – Peggy Lee
- "The Chipmunk Song" – David Seville and the Chipmunks
- "Witchcraft" – Frank Sinatra

Album of the Year

- The Music from Peter Gunn – Henry Mancini
- Tchaikovsky: Concerto No. 1 In B-Flat Minor, Op. 23 – Van Cliburn
- Ella Fitzgerald Sings the Irving Berlin Song Book – Ella Fitzgerald
- Come Fly with Me – Frank Sinatra
- Only the Lonely – Frank Sinatra

Song of the Year

- "Nel Blu Dipinto di Blu (Volare)" – Franco Migliacci and Domenico Modugno, songwriters (Domenico Modugno)
- "Catch a Falling Star" – Lee Pockriss and Paul Vance, songwriters (Perry Como)
- "Gigi" – Alan Jay Lerner and Frederick Loewe, songwriters (Vic Damone)
- "Fever" – Eddie Cooley and Johnny Davenport, songwriters (Peggy Lee)
- "Witchcraft" – Cy Coleman and Carolyn Leigh, songwriters (Frank Sinatra)

=== Children's ===
- Best Recording for Children
  - Ross Bagdasarian Sr. for "The Chipmunk Song (Christmas Don't Be Late)" performed by Ross Bagdasarian Sr. as "David Seville and the Chipmunks"

=== Comedy ===
- Best Comedy Performance
  - Ross Bagdasarian, Sr. for "The Chipmunk Song", performed by Ross Bagdasarian Sr. as "David Seville and the Chipmunks"

=== Composing and arranging ===
- Best Musical Composition First Recorded and Released in 1958 (over 5 minutes duration)
  - Nelson Riddle (composer) for "Cross Country Suite"
- Best Arrangement
  - Henry Mancini (arranger & artist) for The Music from Peter Gunn

=== Country ===
- Best Country & Western Performance
  - The Kingston Trio for "Tom Dooley"

=== Jazz ===
- Best Jazz Performance, Individual
  - Ella Fitzgerald for Ella Fitzgerald Sings the Duke Ellington Songbook
- Best Jazz Performance, Group
  - Count Basie for Basie

=== Musical show ===
- Best Original Cast Album (Broadway or TV)
  - Meredith Willson (composer) & the original cast with Robert Preston, Barbara Cook, David Burns, Eddie Hodges, Pert Kelton & Helen Raymond for The Music Man
- Best Sound Track Album, Dramatic Picture Score or Original Cast
  - André Previn & the original cast for Gigi (Original Motion Picture Soundtrack)

=== Packaging and notes ===
- Best Album Cover Photography
  - Frank Sinatra for Frank Sinatra Sings for Only the Lonely

=== Pop ===
- Best Vocal Performance, Female
  - Ella Fitzgerald for Ella Fitzgerald Sings the Irving Berlin Songbook
- Best Vocal Performance, Male
  - Perry Como for "Catch a Falling Star"
- Best Performance by a Vocal Group or Chorus
  - Keely Smith & Louis Prima for "That Old Black Magic"
- Best Performance by a Dance Band
  - Count Basie for Basie
- Best Performance by an Orchestra
  - Billy May for Billy May's Big Fat Brass

=== Production and engineering ===
- Best Engineered Record - Non-Classical
  - Ted Keep (engineer) for "The Chipmunk Song" performed by David Seville
- Best Engineered Record (Classical)
  - Sherwood Hall III (engineer), Laurindo Almeida & Salli Terri for Duets with Spanish Guitar

=== R&B ===
- Best Rhythm & Blues Performance
  - "Tequila"-The Champs

=== Spoken ===
- Best Performance, Documentary or Spoken Word
  - Stan Freberg for The Best of the Stan Freberg Shows
