= Two for the Road (soundtrack) =

Soundtrack album by Henry Mancini
- Released: 1967
- Recorded: RCA Victor's Music Center of the World, Hollywood, Los Angeles, 1967
- Genre: Jazz
- Length: 32:03
- Label: RCA Victor LSP 3802
- Producer: Joe Reisman

Henry Mancini chronology
Encore! More of the Concert Sound of Henry Mancini (1967)	Two for the Road (1967)	Gunn...Number One!: Music from the Film Score (1967)

Two for the Road is a 1967 soundtrack album by Henry Mancini of music for the film Two for the Road. The title song, with lyrics by Leslie Bricusse, has been described as "perhaps Mancini's best."

Two for the Road was nominated for the Golden Globe Award for Best Original Score at the 25th Golden Globe Awards of 1967.

== Reception ==
Professional ratings
Review scores
Source	Rating
Allmusic	2/5 stars

The initial Billboard review from May 20, 1967, writing that Mancini "scores again" in his "inimitable style" and that the album "contains the freshness and dexterity that Mancini injects in all of his award-winning tracks. A polished performance throughout". The album was one of Billboards 'Pop Picks' for the week.

Greg Adams reviewed the album for Allmusic and wrote that "Only the repetition of the title track interferes with enjoying Two for the Road on its own terms as a varied and entertaining album of mostly instrumental music" and praised the "Mantovani-style strings and jazzy horn solos to a surf beat" of "Something for Audrey" and "Congarocka".

== Track listing ==
All compositions by Henry Mancini. Lyrics to "Two for the Road" by Leslie Bricusse.

1. "Two for the Road" – 2:44
2. "Something for Audrey" – 3:02
3. "The Lovely Life" – 2:20
4. "The Chaser" – 2:36
5. "Something Loose" – 2:50
6. "Happy Barefoot Boy" – 2:51
7. "Two for the Road (Main Title)" – 2:44
8. "Congarocka" – 3:13
9. "French Provincial" – 2:12
10. "The Donk" – 2:47
11. "Domain St. Juste" – 1:27
12. "Two for the Road" – 3:17

== Personnel ==
- Henry Mancini - arranger, conductor, piano
- Dick Bogert - engineer
- Joe Reisman - production
