= Cross Country Suite =

Studio album by Buddy DeFranco
- Released: 1958
- Recorded: 1958
- Genres: Jazz, big band
- Length: 39:09
- Label: Dot Records

Cross Country Suite is a studio album by clarinetist Buddy DeFranco, in a performance of the work of the same name, composed by Nelson Riddle.

== Origin and reception ==
Professional ratings
Review scores
Source	Rating
AllMusic	3/5 stars

Nelson Riddle composed "Cross Country Suite" in 1958 for Buddy DeFranco, who wanted a composition to play at a Le Blanc Clarinet clinic. DeFranco said he "felt it should be a combination of a big band, jazz, and an orchestra . . . [and] it turned out to be one of the best things [Riddle] ever wrote." The suite was also one of Riddle's favorite projects, which he intended to showcase the be-bop clarinetist's brilliance.

The Riddle/DeFranco partnership had its roots in the Swing Era. According to the album liner notes:

They played with and wrote for some of [the era's] giants: Buddy with the bands of Charlie Barnet, Count Basie, Gene Krupa, and Tommy Dorsey; Nelson with those of Charlie Spivak, Bob Crosby, and Tommy Dorsey. It was with the Dorsey orchestra some years ago, in fact, that Cross Country Suite was really born. Riddle and Defranco were contemporaries in that organization; each came to feel that musically he had something to give the other, and they spoke often of such future collaborations as this.

"Cross Country Suite" has been performed on only a few occasions. Portions premiered under Riddle's baton at the Los Angeles Hollywood Bowl on August 29, 1958, as part of a concert headlined by Nat King Cole. Nearly 50 years later, in 2006, Wooster College music professor Jeffrey Lindberg reconstructed the suite from incomplete manuscripts and his own transcription of the 1958 recording, and in 2007, conducted it with DeFranco and the Chicago Jazz Orchestra. In October 2015, clarinetist Ken Peplowski performed excerpts in a concert at the Los Angeles Jazz Institute. The Wooster Symphony Orchestra performed the suite in its entirety in April 2016, with Paquito D’Rivera as soloist, at New York City's Symphony Space. Abroad, the suite was performed twice by the Radio Television Eire Concert Orchestra of Ireland, in 2006 and 2007. Nelson Riddle's son Christopher was conductor of the 2007 concert.

At the first Annual Grammy Awards held on May 4, 1959, Cross Country Suite won the award for "Best Musical Composition First Recorded and Released in 1958 (over 5 minutes duration)." The album was deemed to be an artistic, though not a commercial, success. By 2001, however, 25 percent of the requests on Buddy DeFranco's website were for a compact disc copy. The work was issued on CD in 2008.

The AllMusic review by Scott Yanow awarded the album three stars. He said, "Buddy DeFranco's playing is typically fluid, swinging and explorative within the bop tradition. There are some short spots for trumpeter Don Fagerquist and altoist Herb Geller but DeFranco is the main star and the real reason to search for this long out-of-print rarity."

Although "opportunities to hear the work have been rare," music reviewer Will Friedwald applauds "Cross Country Suite" as "quintessential American concert music, the kind that deserves to be heard more widely."

== Personnel ==
- Nelson Riddle – Composer
- Buddy DeFranco – Clarinet
- Billy Bean – Guitar
- Milt Bernhart – Trombone
- Vince De Rosa – French Horn
- Don Fagerquist – Trumpet
- George Fields – Harmonica
- Herb Geller – Alto Saxophone, Baritone Saxophone
- Pete Jolly – Piano
- Bill Jones – Orchestrator
- Stan Levey – Drums
- Red Mitchell – Bass
- Willie Schwartz – Clarinet

== Track listing ==
=== Side 1 ===
1. "Tall Timber" – 3:55
2. "Smoky Mountain Country" – 2:09
3. "The Rockies" – 4:21
4. "The Great Lakes" – 2:29
5. "The Great Plains" – 2:59
6. "Gulf Coast" – 3:22

=== Side 2 ===
1. "The Mississippi" – 3:22
2. "Down East" – 2:22
3. "El Camino Real" – 3:18
4. "Metropolis" – 4:24
5. "Longhorn" – 3:06
