= Mr. Lucky Goes Latin =

Studio album by Henry Mancini
- Released: 1961
- Studio: RCA Victor Music Center of the World, Hollywood, California
- Genre: Jazz
- Length: 29:56
- Label: RCA Victor
- Producer: Dick Peirce

Henry Mancini chronology
Music from Mr. Lucky (1960)	Mr. Lucky Goes Latin (1961)	Combo! (1962)

Professional ratings
Review scores
Source	Rating
Allmusic	3/5 stars

Mr. Lucky Goes Latin was Henry Mancini's sixth studio LP for RCA Victor Records, and was released in 1961. It was recorded at RCA Victor's Music Center of the World, Hollywood, California. The album was produced by Dick Peirce. Al Schmitt was the recording engineer. Don Peters was responsible for the cover design.

== Concept and origin ==
By January 1961, Henry Mancini had composed a dozen new Latin-themed pieces under his ongoing contract with RCA Victor. Since the first track on the album was an up-tempo cha-cha arrangement of the theme Mancini composed for the TV series Mr. Lucky, the album was given the overall title of Mr. Lucky Goes Latin, even though none of the other tracks had anything to do with that TV series. It had its own soundtrack album, Mancini's Music from Mr. Lucky. Of the more than ninety albums he would release over his lifetime, Mancini pronounced Mr. Lucky Goes Latin to be his favorite.

== Awards and recognition ==
Mr. Lucky Goes Latin earned a Grammy nomination, for Best Performance by an Orchestra—For Dancing.

Mr. Lucky Goes Latin was ranked the third most favorite LP of the year in Billboard Music Week's 14th Annual Disk Jockey Poll.

== Track listing ==
1. "Mr. Lucky Goes Latin" – 2:13
2. "Lujon" – 2:37
3. "Tinpanola" – 2:04
4. "Rain Drops in Rio" – 2:42
5. "Siesta" – 2:50
6. "The Dancing Cat" – 2:57
7. "Cow Bells and Coffee Beans" – 3:03
8. "The Sound of Silver" – 2:31
9. "Tango Americano" – 2:42
10. "No-Cal Sugar Loaf" – 2:05
11. "Blue Mantilla" – 2:30
12. "Speedy Gonzales" – 1:42
