= The Blues and the Beat =

Studio album by Henry Mancini
- Released: 1960
- Recorded: February 22, 26, 29, 1960
- Studio: RCA Victor Music Center of the World, Hollywood, California
- Genre: Jazz
- Label: RCA Victor
- Producer: Dick Peirce

Henry Mancini chronology
| The Mancini Touch (1959) | The Blues and the Beat (1960) | Music from Mr. Lucky (1960) |

The Blues and The Beat was Henry Mancini's fourth studio LP for RCA Victor Records, following the successes of The Music from Peter Gunn, More Music from Peter Gunn, and The Mancini Touch.

== Origin and concept ==
The Blues and The Beat was recorded in February 1960 at RCA Victor's Music Center of the World in Hollywood, California. Liner notes attributed to Mancini observed that jazz can be distilled into two essential components: the blues and the beat. The album treats songs on the first side with a "blues feel", and on the second side with a "stirring jazz beat".

Mancini's orchestral albums had been characterized by critics as fresh and impressive. For The Blues and The Beat, the blues selections "were darker, somewhat less distinctive ballad covers (the brass choir of four French horns blending with trumpets and trombones enriched tunes like 'Smoke Rings' and 'Mood Indigo')." On the "beat" side, "Pete Candoli's powerhouse trumpet carried Mancini's slowly building arrangement of 'Sing, Sing, Sing' to the edge of frenzy."

Two tracks were released as a 45 rpm single: "The Blues" c/w "Big Noise From Winnetka". Reviewing the record, Billboard magazine gave it four stars, with very strong sales potential.

== Critical reviews ==
The Cash Box praised The Blues and The Beat, naming it one of the Popular Picks of the Week in August 1960:

The "dramatic jazz" Mancini touch is put to another big band session sure to meet with commercial success. Actually there is only one blues number in the package, "Alright, Okay, You Win," and that shows up on the "beat" side of the disk. The "blues" side does contain some effective murky ballad moods: "After Hours," "Mood Indigo," "Misty;" the "beat" side contains well played, clean and crisp swingers: "Big Noise From Winnetka," "Sing, Sing, Sing."

Billboard magazine was equally enthusiastic, noting that the "unusual instrumentation" would appeal both to jazz fans and to the pop market. It observed that the album "doesn't have the assist of a big TV show (a la Mancini's 'Peter Gunn' and 'Mr. Lucky' best sellers) but quality-wise it's first-rate."

Not all critics were kind. In Hi/Fi Stereo Review, Ralph J. Gleason characterized The Blues and The Beat as a gimmick album, "the sort of thing that, in the music business, follows the Hollywood formula of artfully packaging something of no value at all." He acknowledged that "there are good soloists present who pop up once in awhile on one channel or another." He classified the overall performance as slick, and the recording as brittle.

== Awards ==
The Blues and The Beat won the Grammy Award for Best Jazz Performance Large Group in 1961, the first year of the category. It was nominated in the category Best Performance By A Band For Dancing.

== Track listing ==
| No. | Title | Writer(s) | Length |
|---|---|---|---|
| 1. | "The Blues" | Henry Mancini | 2:41 |
| 2. | "Smoke Rings" | H.Eugene Gifford, Ned Washington | 3:15 |
| 3. | "Misty" | Erroll Garner | 3:35 |
| 4. | "Blue Flame" | James "Jiggs" Noble, Joe Bishop, Leo Corday | 2:47 |
| 5. | "After Hours" | Avery Parrish | 3:07 |
| 6. | "Mood Indigo" | Barney Bigard, Duke Ellington, Irving Mills | 3:03 |
| 7. | "The Beat" | Henry Mancini | 3:06 |
| 8. | "Big Noise from Winnetka" | Bob Haggart, Ray Bauduc | 2:39 |
| 9. | "Alright, Okay, You Win" | Mayme Watts, Sid Wyche | 2:58 |
| 10. | "Tippin' In" | Bobby Smith, Marty Symes | 3:45 |
| 11. | "How Could You Do a Thing Like That to Me" | Allan Roberts, Tyree Glenn | 3:30 |
| 12. | "Sing, Sing, Sing" | Louis Prima | 3:11 |

== Personnel ==
- Dick Nash, Jimmy Priddy, John Halliburton, Karl De Karske – trombone
- Conrad Gozzo, Frank Beach, Graham Young, Pete Candoli – trumpet
- George Price, Herman Lebow, John Graas, Richard Perissi, Sinclair Lott, Vincent DeRosa – French horn
- Gene Cipriano, Harry Klee, Ronnie Lang, Ted Nash, Wilbur Schwartz – woodwinds
- Larry Bunker – vibraphone
- Victor Feldman – vibraphone, marimba
- Johnny Williams – piano
- Roland Bundock – bass
- Bob Bain – guitar
- Jack Sperling – drums

Production

- Dick Peirce – producer
- Al Schmitt – engineer
- Henry Mancini – liner notes
