= Sunflower (1970 film) =

1970 film by Vittorio De Sica

I Girasoli (Sunflower)
- Italian release poster
- Directed by: Vittorio De Sica
- Written by: Tonino Guerra; Giorgi Mdivani; Cesare Zavattini
- Produced by: Arthur Cohn; Joseph E. Levine; Carlo Ponti
- Starring: Sophia Loren; Marcello Mastroianni; Lyudmila Savelyeva
- Cinematography: Giuseppe Rotunno
- Edited by: Adriana Novelli
- Music by: Henry Mancini
- Production companies: Compagnia Cinematografica Champion (as C. C. Champion S.p.A.); Les Films Concordia; Mosfilm
- Distributed by: Avco Embassy
- Release dates: March 13, 1970 (Premiere); March 19, 1970
- Running time: 101 minutes
- Countries: Italy; France; Soviet Union; United States
- Languages: Italian; Russian
- Box office: $2 million (US/Italy rentals)

Sunflower (Italian: I girasoli) is a 1970 romantic war tragedy film directed by Vittorio De Sica. An international co-production of Italy, France, the Soviet Union and the United States, the film was shot in the Soviet Union; some scenes were filmed near Moscow, while others near Poltava, a regional center in Ukraine.

== Plot ==
"A woman born for love. A man born to love her. A timeless moment in a world gone mad."

Giovanna (Sophia Loren) and Antonio (Marcello Mastroianni) marry to delay Antonio's deployment during World War II. After that buys them twelve days of happiness, they try another scheme, in which Antonio pretends to be mentally ill. Finally, Antonio is sent to the Russian Front. When the war is over, Antonio does not return and is listed as missing in action. Despite the odds, Giovanna is convinced her true love has survived the war and is still in the Soviet Union. Determined, she journeys there to find him.

In the Soviet Union, Giovanna visits the sunflower fields, where there is supposedly one flower for each fallen Italian soldier, and where the Germans forced the Italians to dig their own mass graves. Eventually, Giovanna finds Antonio, but by now he has started a second family with a woman who saved his life, and they have one daughter. Childless, having been faithful to her husband, Giovanna returns to Italy, heartbroken, but unwilling to disrupt Antonio's new life. Some years later, Antonio returns to Giovanna, asking her to come back with him to the Soviet Union. Meanwhile, Giovanna has tried to move on with her own life, moving out of their first home together and into her own apartment. She works in a factory and is living with a man with whom she has a baby boy. Antonio visits her and tries to explain his new life, how war changes a man, how safe he felt with this new woman after years of death. Unwilling to ruin Antonio's daughter's or her own little son's life, Giovanna refuses to leave Italy. As they part, Antonio gives her a fur, which he had promised years before that he'd bring back for her. The lovers lock eyes as Antonio's train takes him away from Giovanna, and from Italy, forever.

== Cast ==
- Sophia Loren as Giovanna
- Marcello Mastroianni as Antonio
- Lyudmila Savelyeva as Masha (Maria)
- Galina Andreyeva as Valentina, Soviet official
- Anna Carena as Antonio's mother
- Germano Longo as Ettore
- Nadezhda Cherednichenko as Woman in sunflower fields
- Glauco Onorato as Returning soldier
- Silvano Tranquilli as Italian worker in Russia
- Marisa Traversi as Prostitute
- Gunars Cilinskis as Russian Ministry Official
- Carlo Ponti, Jr. as Giovanna's baby
- Pippo Starnazza as Italian official
- Dino Peretti
- Giorgio Basso

== Release ==
Sunflower was released on Saint Joseph's Day, 19 March 1970, in 5 key cities in Italy. It expanded to an additional 13 cities at Easter. It was the first Italian film to be dubbed and screened at Radio City Music Hall in New York City.

== Reception ==
In its first three months on release in Italy, the film earned theatrical rentals of $1 million. Despite reaching number one in the United States in its seventh week of release, the film performed disappointingly in the United States earning rentals of $1,038,000.

== Soundtrack ==
Sunflower

Film score by Henry Mancini
- Released: 1970
- Recorded: 1969–1970
- Genre: Soundtrack
- Length: 31:15
- Label: Avco Records
- Producer: Henry Mancini

Professional ratings
Review scores
Source	Rating
AllMusic	5/5 stars

=== Track listing ===
==== SIDE A ====
01. Love Theme from "Sunflower" (2:26)
02. Masha's Theme (1:54)
03. Giovanna (1:54)
04. The Search (4:20)
05. Love in the Sand (Love Theme from "Sunflower") (3:00)
06. New Home in Moscow (1:20)

==== SIDE B ====
07. Two Girls ("Masha's Theme and Love Theme from "Sunflower") (2:07)
08. The Retreat (5:10)
09. The Invitation (2:04)
10. Masha Finds Antonio (Masha's Theme) (3:35)
11. The Parting in Milan (Love Theme From "Sunflower") (3:23)

== Awards ==
- David di Donatello: Best Actress (Sophia Loren)
- Academy Award nomination for Best Music, Original Score

== Novelization ==
Shortly before the US release of the film, Popular Library released an English language novelization of the screenplay by noted science fiction writer Thomas M. Disch under the pseudonym “Victor Hastings.”

== See also ==
- 1970 in film
