= Hatari! (soundtrack) =

Hatari! Music from the Paramount Motion Picture Score

Soundtrack album by Henry Mancini
- Released: 1962
- Studio: RCA (Hollywood, California)
- Genre: Soundtrack
- Label: RCA Victor Records

Hatari! Music from the Paramount Motion Picture Score is the soundtrack from the 1962 movie Hatari! starring John Wayne. The music was composed and conducted by Henry Mancini. It included the hit single "Baby Elephant Walk". It entered Billboard magazine's pop album chart on July 28, 1962, peaked at No. 4, and remained on the chart for 35 weeks. AllMusic gave the album a rating of two-and-a-half stars. Reviewer Ted Mills called it "a fun blend of jazz and Afro-exotica, jungle drums mixed with a classic bop combo."

== Track listing ==
Side A

1. "Theme from 'Hatari!'" (Henry Mancini) [2:53]
2. "Baby Elephant Walk" (Henry Mancini) [2:40]
3. "Just for Tonight" (Johnny Mercer, Hoagy Carmichael) [2:00]
4. "Your Father's Feathers" (Henry Mancini) [3:30]
5. "Night Side" (Henry Mancini) [3:22]
6. "Big Band Bwana" (Henry Mancini) [3:01]

Side B

1. "The Sounds of Hatari" (Henry Mancini) [6:41]
2. "The Soft Touch" (Henry Mancini) [2:43]
3. "Crocodile, Go Home!" (Henry Mancini) [2:53]
