= Our Man in Hollywood =

Studio album by Henry Mancini
- Released: 1963
- Recorded: 1963
- Studios: RCA Victor's Music Center of the World, Hollywood, Los Angeles
- Genre: Traditional pop
- Length: 39:14
- Label: RCA Victor LSP-2604
- Producers: Dick Peirce, Steve Sholes

Henry Mancini chronology
Combo! (1962)	Our Man in Hollywood (1963)	Uniquely Mancini (1963)

Our Man in Hollywood is a 1963 album by American composer and arranger Henry Mancini.

== Reception ==
Professional ratings
Review scores
Source	Rating
AllMusic	3/5 stars
New Record Mirror	3/5 stars

Greg Adams reviewed the album for AllMusic and wrote that "All of the selections were newly recorded for the album, and many display Mancini's skill as a composer as well as arranger and conductor".

The initial Billboard review from January 5, 1963 commented that the tracks featured the "highly stylised Mancini treatment" and noted the "wall to wall violins" and "driving percussion" of the "top-notch Hollywood instrumentalists".

== Track listing ==
1. "Days of Wine and Roses" (Henry Mancini, Johnny Mercer) – 2:05
2. "Walk on the Wild Side" (Elmer Bernstein, Mack David) – 3:27
3. "The Theme from "The Wonderful World of the Brothers Grimm" (Bob Merrill) – 1:52
4. "Love Song from "Mutiny on the Bounty (Follow Me)" (Bronislaw Kaper, Paul Francis Webster) – 2:44
5. "Mr. Hobbs Theme" (Mancini) – 1:54
6. "Seventy-Six Trombones" (Meredith Willson) – 2:33
7. "Love Theme from Phaedra" (Mikis Theodorakis) – 2:38
8. "Bachelor in Paradise" (Mancini, David) – 2:28
9. "Too Little Time" (from The Glenn Miller Story) (Don Raye, Mancini) – 3:48
10. "Drink More Milk (Bevete Piu Latte!)" (from Boccaccio '70) (Nino Rota) – 2:05
11. "The Wishing Star" (from Taras Bulba) (Franz Waxman, David) – 2:55
12. "Dreamsville" (Ray Evans, Jay Livingston, Henry Mancini) – 3:12

== Personnel ==
- Henry Mancini – arranger, conductor
- Vincent DeRosa – French horn (solo on "Days of Wine and Roses")
- Plas Johnson – tenor saxophone (solo on "Walk on the Wild Side")
- Dick Nash – trombone (solo on "Too Little Time")
- Ted Nash – soprano saxophone (solo on "Love Theme from Phaedra")
- Ronnie Lang – piccolos
- Laurindo Almeida – guitar
- Shelly Manne – percussion
- Bob Bain – guitar
- Jimmy Rowles – piano
- Unidentified chorus

Production

- Al Schmitt – engineer
- Dick Peirce, Steve Sholes – producer
