= Music from Mr. Lucky =

Studio album by Henry Mancini
- Released: 1960
- Recorded: December 4, 10, 17, 1959
- Studio: RCA Victor Music Center of the World, Hollywood, California
- Genre: Jazz
- Length: 35:01
- Label: RCA Victor
- Producer: Dick Peirce

Henry Mancini chronology
The Blues and the Beat (1959)	Music from Mr. Lucky (1960)	Mr. Lucky Goes Latin (1961)

Professional ratings
Review scores
Source	Rating
Allmusic	3/5 stars

Music from Mr. Lucky, Henry Mancini’s fifth studio LP for RCA Victor Records, was a soundtrack album to the TV series Mr. Lucky. It was recorded at RCA Victor's Music Center of the World, Hollywood, California, on December 4, 10, and 17, 1959, and released in the spring of 1960.

== Origin and concept ==
Mr. Lucky was a second effort by Blake Edwards's Spartan Productions, following on the success of its private eye TV series Peter Gunn. As Peter Gunn spawned the successful Mancini album of the same name, Mr. Lucky reprised Mancini's talents and similarly generated a like soundtrack album. In liner notes attributed to Edwards, he said, "the proper background music makes a very sizeable contribution to the dramatic qualities of a television show," observing that it was therefore not surprising that "Mancini was called in during the very early planning stages of our new series." Indeed, CBS-TV, which broadcast Peter Gunn, conditioned a deal for a second series on the music of Mancini being part of the package.

In contrast to Peter Gunn's club combo sound of background jazz-pop, the Mr. Lucky sound was said to be that of a ballroom orchestra, with "lightly Latin rhythms, the bright use of woodwinds in all combinations, and, at least in the main theme, lush string writing." The presence of a Hammond electric organ added to the soundtrack's unique sound.

The album was produced by Dick Peirce. Al Schmitt was the recording engineer and Buddy Cole was keyboardist at the Hammond electric organ. Don Peters was the cover designer.

== Critical reviews and chart performance ==
In its February 22, 1960, issue, Billboard magazine listed Music from Mr. Lucky among its Spotlight Winners of the Week, described as having the strongest sales potential of all albums reviewed that week. It speculated that Mancini "could have another smash set with 'Mr. Lucky,'" which contains "some wonderfully bright, whimsical Mancini music, smartly arranged, and delightfully performed."

Music from Mr. Lucky entered the Billboard Top LPs charts the week of March 28, 1960. The mono LP remained on the chart for 35 weeks, 15 weeks in the top ten, reaching the highest rank of number five. The separately charted stereo LP entered the chart at number 6, and remained in the top ten for 27 weeks. It reached number two the week of August 15, 1960, behind The Kingston Trio's Sold Out.

== Awards ==
The National Academy of Recording Arts & Sciences (NARAS) awarded Mancini two Grammys for the title tune: Best Arrangement, and Best Performance by an Orchestra (Other Than for Dancing).

== Track listing ==
1. "Mr. Lucky" – 2:17
2. "My Friend Andamo" – 3:34
3. "Softly" – 2:47
4. "March of the Cue Balls" – 3:18
5. "Lightly Latin" – 2:59
6. "Tipsy" – 2:33
7. "Floating Pad" – 2:57
8. "One-Eyed Cat" – 3:17
9. "Night Flower" – 2:28
10. "Chime Time" – 3:20
11. "Blue Satin" – 2:37
12. "That's It and That's All" – 2:54
