= Mr. Lucky (TV series) =

American adventure/drama television series (1959–1960)

- The Complete Series DVD cover
- Created by: Blake Edwards, based on a story by Milton Holmes
- Starring: John Vivyan; Ross Martin; Pippa Scott; Tom Brown
- Opening theme: "Theme From 'Mr. Lucky'"
- Composer: Henry Mancini
- Country of origin: United States
- Original language: English
- No. of seasons: 1
- No. of episodes: 34

Production
- Executive producer: Gordon Oliver
- Producer: Jack Arnold
- Running time: 30 Minutes
- Production company: Spartan Productions

Original release
- Network: CBS
- Release: October 24, 1959 – June 18, 1960

Mr. Lucky is an American adventure drama television series that aired from 1959 to 1960 on CBS. The title character, played by John Vivyan, was an honest professional gambler who used his plush floating casino, the ship Fortuna, as his base of operations. His good friend Andamo helped him run the casino.

Blake Edwards developed the program as a retooling of his Willie Dante character from Four Star Playhouse, in which the role of a former gambler who operates Dante's Inferno, a San Francisco, California nightclub, was played by Four Star studio boss Dick Powell.

Edwards directed and co-wrote the first episode of Mr. Lucky, and the credits of the first eighteen episodes included the text, "Entire production supervised by Blake Edwards." Jack Arnold (director of Creature from the Black Lagoon, The Incredible Shrinking Man, and It Came from Outer Space) produced the show and directed fifteen of the thirty-four episodes.

Henry Mancini's smooth theme music for the show reached Number 21 in the US singles charts. He released two successful LP's based on music from show: Mr. Lucky and Mr. Lucky Goes Latin.

== Cast and format ==
Along with John Vivyan cast in the title role, Ross Martin portrayed Andamo. Pippa Scott had a recurring role as Maggie Shank-Rutherford, Lucky's girlfriend. Tom Brown also had a recurring role, as Lieutenant Rovacs of the city police.

Mr. Lucky is an honest professional gambler with extraordinary luck. He carries a pocket watch whose chimes play the first five notes of the Mr. Lucky theme music. He and Andamo operate a floating casino aboard a luxury yacht anchored outside an American port city. (The yacht in reality was the Alamo, a 148-foot yacht owned by former Compton, California mayor Col. C.S. Smith, publisher of the now-defunct Compton Herald American Newspaper chain.) Their business brings them into contact with numerous criminals and people hiding from criminals. This continues even after Lucky changes their business to a floating restaurant (see "Format change" below).

The website "TV Obscurities" indicates that Mr. Lucky's actual name was never identified in the series. The episode "Aces Back to Back" reveals that Lucky is a veteran of the United States Navy, and in the episode "Odyssey of Hate", he demonstrates that he still knows how to manipulate an M1 rifle.

The end credits state that Mr. Lucky was "Based on an Original Story: 'Bundles for Freedom' by Milton Holmes." This story was also the basis of the 1943 motion picture Mr. Lucky, starring Cary Grant whose name in the film was Joe Adams. The film and the television series had little in common beside the title and the suave nature of the lead characters.

The first episode of the series, "The Magnificent Bribe", begins with Lucky and Andamo running a successful casino in Andamo's homeland, the island nation of Chobolobo (the name is not mentioned until the second episode). To stay in business, they must pay a weekly bribe of $1000 to the country's corrupt president (Nehemiah Persoff). They lose everything because of Andamo's revolutionary activities: he uses Lucky's yacht, the Fortuna, to smuggle guns to the revolutionaries, and he helps a beautiful female assassin (Ziva Rodann) get into position to kill the president. The episode ends with Lucky and Andamo escaping in a small boat with nothing but the clothes on their backs.

In the second episode, "They Shall Not Pass", Lucky and Andamo arrive by freighter in an unnamed American port city. Lucky wins enough money in a crap game to buy another yacht and a truck full of gambling equipment. He renames the yacht Fortuna II (pronounced "Fortuna the Second"), and anchors her outside the three-mile limit to operate as a floating casino.

The city where Lucky and Andamo operate is never mentioned by name, and various episodes give conflicting clues as to its identity. The city's marked police cars (black and white 1959 Plymouth four-door sedans) are marked simply "POLICE", not with the city's name or seal.

Mr. Lucky drives a 1960 Chrysler New Yorker Chrysler Imperial convertible.

== Format change ==
Beginning with the February 6, 1960, episode ("The Brain Picker"), Lucky changed his business from a floating casino to a floating restaurant. This was done by order of the show's sponsor, Lever Brothers, due mainly to the 1950s quiz show scandals. Dwight Whitney wrote about the format change in the following week's issue of TV Guide:

"The Fumigated Air: Lever Bros. came up with a puzzling decision last week. It decided that soap and gambling don't mix. As the sponsor of one of the year's two big hits, Mr. Lucky (the other being Dennis the Menace), the powers-that-be sent down orders that the celebrated television character played by John Vivyan would henceforth have to be made respectabilized. Almost immediately Lucky turned up running a restaurant instead of gambling aboard his ship. By so ordering it seemed that the soap company was taking a big gamble itself. By taking the bite out of the character, it was running a very real risk of transforming one of the season's big hits into a big flop, to say nothing of fumigating the air so thoroughly that even soap suds might seem astringent after that."

== Cancellation ==
Despite the fact that the show was one of the highest-rated new series of the 1959–1960 season, being ranked 21st among programs with a 24.4 average household share, Lever Brothers (and alternate sponsor Brown & Williamson) cancelled their sponsorship at the end of the season. CBS could not find other sponsors to replace them, and finally cancelled the series. John Vivyan believed the program was pulled in order to give up its Saturday time slot, as a favor to Jack Benny, to a new drama in the fall of 1960, Checkmate, which was produced by Benny's company, JaMco Productions.

According to Henry Mancini in his autobiography, Blake Edwards himself canceled the show because of the format change:

"Mr. Lucky," a very stylish story about a suave, hip guy who runs a gambling boat somewhere off the California coast, was an immediate success. But it went on the air shortly after the TV quiz show scandals ... That and other scandals had cast a pall over the industry, and the network executives were frightened of any hint of moral criticism. "Mr. Lucky" became the target, particularly in the South, of that element in the American population that later became known as the moral majority. They took umbrage that the character ran a gambling boat, and around the fourth or fifth show Blake began to get pressure from CBS. The sponsor didn't seem to be concerned, but CBS insisted that Blake change Mr. Lucky's character from that of gambler to restaurateur and turn the ship into a restaurant. Blake fought, telling CBS, "You'll take the balls out of the whole story."

In the event he went along with them, and the minute Mr. Lucky lost his gambling boat, the ratings took a nosedive. No longer excellent, they remained good enough to keep the show on the air, but Blake was unhappy. At the end of the year, he said, "I'm not gonna lend my name to this," and closed the show down.

== Attempted revivals ==
Blake Edwards developed a Mr. Lucky movie for Paramount Pictures in the mid-1960s to follow his big screen adaptation of Peter Gunn for the studio. The disappointing performance of the film Gunn saw the project's abandonment. Aaron Spelling and Blake Edwards later teamed to develop a movie of the week in 1980, Casino, starring Mike Connors as a similar gambler character. Edwards developed another Mr. Lucky revival for New World Television in the late 1980s to follow his Peter Gunn revival for the studio. When the latter project failed to be picked up as a weekly series, New World pulled the plug on Mr. Lucky.

== Episodes ==
No.	Title	Directed by	Written by	Original release date
1	"The Magnificent Bribe"	Blake Edwards	Arthur A. Ross & Blake Edwards	October 24, 1959
Pilot episode.
2	"They Shall Not Pass"	Jack Arnold	Lester Pine	October 31, 1959
3	"Bugsy"	Jack Arnold	Lester Pine	November 7, 1959
With Clegg Hoyt as Pudge.
4	"The Money Game"	Paul Nickell	Gene L. Coon	November 14, 1959
Guest-starring Barbara Bain as Prudence.
5	"That Stands for Pool"	Jack Arnold	Lester Pine	November 21, 1959
6	"My Little Gray Home"	Jerry Hopper	Lester Pine	November 28, 1959
7	"The Gordon Caper"	Anton Leader	Lester Pine	December 5, 1959
8	"Little Miss Wow"	Boris Sagal	Gene L. Coon	December 12, 1959
Guest-starring Yvonne Craig.
9	"A Business Measure"	Boris Sagal	Lester Pine	December 19, 1959
10	"Hijacked"	Lamont Johnson	Story by : A.A. Roberts; Teleplay by : A.A. Roberts, Tony Barrett & Lewis Reed	December 26, 1959
11	"Aces Back to Back"	Lamont Johnson	Gene L. Coon	January 2, 1960
12	"Maggie the Witness"	Boris Sagal	Lester Pine	January 9, 1960
13	"The Two Million Dollar Window"	Boris Sagal	Lewis Reed & Tony Barrett	January 16, 1960
14	"The Leadville Kid Gang"	Alan Crosland Jr.	Gene L. Coon	January 23, 1960
15	"The Sour Milk Fund"	Jack Arnold	Gene L. Coon	January 30, 1960
16	"The Brain Picker"	Boris Sagal	Gene L. Coon	February 6, 1960
17	"The Last Laugh"	Alan Crosland Jr.	Gene L. Coon	February 13, 1960
18	"The Parolee"	Lamont Johnson	Story by : Lester Pine; Teleplay by : Lester Pine & Gene L. Coon	February 20, 1960
19	"The Tax Man"	Jack Arnold	Ken Kolb	February 27, 1960
20	"The Gladiators"	Alan Crosland Jr.	Gene L. Coon	March 5, 1960
With Kent Taylor.
21	"Big Squeeze"	Jack Arnold	David P. Harmon	March 12, 1960
22	"Cold Deck"	Jack Arnold	John Hawkins	March 19, 1960
23	"His Maiden Voyage"	Boris Sagal	Jameson Brewer	March 26, 1960
24	"I Bet Your Life"	Jack Arnold	David P. Harmon	April 2, 1960
25	"Hair of the Dog"	Lamont Johnson	Stirling Silliphant	April 9, 1960
26	"Vote the Bullet"	Jack Arnold	Lewis Reed & Tony Barrett	April 16, 1960
27	"Hit and Run"	Jack Arnold	Steve McNeil	April 23, 1960
28	"Taking a Chance"	Jack Arnold	David P. Harmon	April 30, 1960
29	"Last Journey"	Jack Arnold	Sam Ross	May 14, 1960
With Clegg Hoyt as Pudge and Ann McCrea as Deena.
30	"Operation Fortuna"	Jack Arnold	Paul David	May 21, 1960
Guest-starring Jack Nicholson.
31	"Stacked Deck"	Jack Arnold	Jameson Brewer	May 28, 1960
32	"Odyssey of Hate"	Terence Nelson	Leon Tokatyan	June 4, 1960
33	"Dangerous Lady"	Jack Arnold	Michael Fessier	June 11, 1960
34	"Election Bet"	Jerry Hopper	Story by : Lester Pine; Teleplay by : Lester Pine & Paul David	June 18, 1960

== Home media ==
On October 16, 2012, Timeless Media Group released Mr. Lucky - The Complete Series on DVD in Region 1. The 4-disc set features all 34 episodes of the series, and a bonus CD featuring Henry Mancini's soundtrack. The show is also available for streaming to subscribers of Amazon Prime Video.

== Soundtrack recordings ==
Mr. Lucky spawned two LP albums of music composed and conducted by Henry Mancini. Music from Mr. Lucky (RCA Victor LPM/LSP-2198) was released in 1960. Mr. Lucky Goes Latin (RCA Victor LPM/LSP-2360) was released in 1961.
