= Ninety Miles an Hour (Down a Dead End Street) =

Song by Hank Snow
- Released: 1963
- Genre: Country
- Label: RCA Victor
- Songwriters: Don Robinson, Hal Blair

"Ninety Miles an Hour (Down a Dead End Street)" is a country music song written by Don Robertson and Hal Blair, recorded by Hank Snow, and released on the RCA Victor label. In October 1963, it reached No. 2 on the country charts, and spent 22 weeks on the charts.

The song's lyrics tell of a doomed relationship between a couple who belong to others. They start with a few stolen kisses, but instead of stopping, they keep going until they discover the brakes are gone. The lyrics compare the relationship metaphorically to a motorcycle driven by the devil at 90 miles an hour down a dead end street, ignoring a warning voice, her lips like sweet wine as they head toward a stone wall.

Later covers of the song include:

- The songwriter Don Robertson released his version of the song on his 1965 album "Heart On My Sleeve."
- Katy Moffatt covered the song on her 1976 album "Katy."
- Bob Dylan covered the song for his 1988 album "Down in the Groove."
- Ashley Hutchings covered the song and included it on his 1995 album "The Guv'nor vol 2" and his 2019 album "Gone Missing."

The song was included on multiple compilation greatest hits albums of Snow's hits, including "The Living Legend" (1975), "Snow Country" (1992), and "The Essential Hank Snow" (1997).
