= Bob Bain =

American jazz guitarist (1924–2018)

- Born: January 26, 1924; Chicago, Illinois, U.S.
- Died: June 21, 2018 (aged 94); Oxnard, California, U.S.
- Genres: Jazz, pop, rock
- Occupation(s): Musician, composer
- Instrument: Guitar
- Years active: 1940s–2010s
- Labels: Capitol

Bob Bain (26 January 1924 – 21 June 2018) was an American guitarist mainly known for his film music contributions, including “Dr. Zhivago” (1965), where he played the balalaika in the score for certain scenes where “Lara’s Theme” is heard.

== Career ==
Bain's professional career began in the 1940s playing guitar in popular big band outfits led by Tommy Dorsey and Bob Crosby. He is credited with guitar on one of Dorsey's biggest hits, "Opus No. 1". He was an unusually early adopter of the electric guitar, playing an early Gibson Les Paul model before switching to a modified 1953 Fender Telecaster. Like most jazz guitarists, he also favoured semi-acoustic models such as the Gibson L-5 and ES-150.

In 2017, the Fender Custom Shop did a limited edition replication of Bain's 1953 Telecaster, called the Bob Bain Son of A Gunn Telecaster. 30 were hand-built by Fender master builder Paul Waller.

Bain was long time collaborator with composer Henry Mancini. He is also credited with the guitar introduction to the theme from the popular 1950s television private detective series "Peter Gunn". The soundtrack album from the series features several other memorable contributions of Bain's. Bain also contributed guitar on another of Mancini's significant soundtrack albums, the musical score to the movie "Breakfast at Tiffany's", as well as playing on the soundtrack to the television Western series "Bonanza". Support Act for a Beatles concert in Newcastle England in 1964

== Discography ==
- 1958: Rockin' Rollin' Strollin' (Capitol)
- 1958: Theme from "Peter Gunn" (RCA)
- 1960: Latin Love (Capitol)
- 1960: Guitar De Amor (Capitol)
- 2014: The Guitars of Bob Bain (Blue Moon Producciones Discográficas S.L.)
