= The Music from Peter Gunn =

1959 soundtrack album by Henry Mancini

Soundtrack album by Henry Mancini
- Released: January 1959
- Recorded: August 26, 31, and September 4, 29, 1958
- Studio: Radio Recorders (Hollywood)
- Genres: Jazz; cool jazz
- Length: 39:52
- Label: RCA Victor
- Producer: Simon Rady

Henry Mancini chronology
Sousa in Stereo (1958)	The Music from Peter Gunn (1959)	The Mancini Touch (1959)

More Music from Peter Gunn

Soundtrack album by Henry Mancini
- Released: 1959
- Studio: RCA Music Center of the World (Hollywood)
- Genre: Jazz
- Length: 49:01
- Label: RCA Victor
- Producer: Dick Peirce

Professional ratings
Review scores
Source	Rating
Allmusic	5/5 stars

The Music from Peter Gunn is a soundtrack album to the TV series Peter Gunn, composed and conducted by Henry Mancini, and released in January 1959 by RCA Victor (LPM/LSP-1956). It was the first album ever to win the Grammy Award for Album of the Year in 1959. The album was followed by More Music from Peter Gunn, released on RCA Victor in July 1959. In 1998, the album was inducted into the Grammy Hall of Fame.

The opening theme music is notable for its combination of jazz orchestration with a straightforward rock 'n roll beat. In his autobiography Did They Mention the Music? Mancini stated:

The Peter Gunn title theme actually derives more from rock and roll than from jazz. I used guitar and piano in unison, playing what is known in music as an ostinato, which means obstinate. It was sustained throughout the piece, giving it a sinister effect, with some frightened saxophone sounds and some shouting brass. The piece has one chord throughout and a super-simple top line.

In 1977, RCA reissued The Music from Peter Gunn in the mid-priced "Pure Gold" series under catalog number ANL1-2143. RCA first reissued the album on compact disc in 1988.

The Music from Peter Gunn was selected by the Library of Congress as a 2010 addition to the National Recording Registry, which selects recordings annually that are "culturally, historically, or aesthetically significant".

The theme from Peter Gunn has been featured in the films The Blues Brothers, Sixteen Candles, and The Lion King 1½.

== Track listings ==
The Music from Peter Gunn (1959) RCA Victor LPM/LSP-1956

1. "Peter Gunn" – 2:06
2. "Sorta Blue" – 2:57
3. "The Brothers Go to Mother's" – 2:56
4. "Dreamsville" – 3:51
5. "Session at Pete's Pad" – 3:57
6. "Soft Sounds" – 3:35
7. "Fallout!" – 3:13
8. "The Floater" – 3:15
9. "Slow and Easy" – 3:04
10. "A Profound Gass" – 3:18
11. "Brief and Breezy" – 3:31
12. "Not from Dixie" – 4:09

More Music from Peter Gunn (1959) RCA Victor LPM/LSP-2040

1. "Walkin' Bass" – 4:20
2. "Timothy" – 2:35
3. "Joanna" – 2:39
4. "My Manne Shelly" – 2:35
5. "Goofin' At The Coffee House" – 4:09
6. "Odd Ball" – 3:22
7. "Blue Steel" – 3:39
8. "The Little Man Theme" – 3:12
9. "Spook!" – 2:55
10. "A Quiet Gass" – 3:01
11. "Lightly" – 3:21
12. "Blues For Mother's" – 3:16

== Personnel ==
Musicians vary from song to song, but include:

- Pete Candoli, Ray Linn, Frank Beach, Uan Rasey, Conrad Gozzo - trumpet
- Dick Nash, Jimmy Priddy, Milt Bernhart, Karl DeKarske - trombone
- John Graas, Vincent DeRosa, Richard Perissi, John Cave - French horn
- Ted Nash, Plas Johnson, Ronny Lang, Paul Horn, Gene Cipriano - reeds
- John Williams - piano
- Bob Bain, Al Hendrickson - guitar
- Victor Feldman, Larry Bunker - vibraphone
- Rolly Bundock - bass
- Shelly Manne, Alvin Stoller, Jack Sperling - drums

== Certifications ==
Region	Certification	Certified units/sales
United States (RIAA)	Gold	500,000^{^}
^{^} Shipments figures based on certification alone.
