= Henry Mancini =

American film composer (1924–1994)

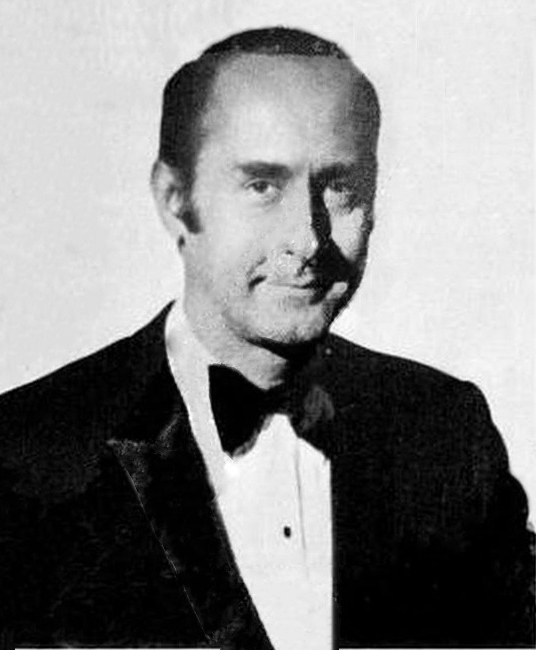
- Mancini c. 1970

Background information
- Born: Enrico Nicola Mancini; April 16, 1924; Cleveland, Ohio, U.S.
- Died: June 14, 1994 (aged 70) Los Angeles, California, U.S.
- Genres: Theme music; film scores; rock and roll; easy listening; jazz rock; crime jazz
- Occupations: Composer; songwriter; arranger; conductor
- Instrument: Piano
- Years active: 1946–1994
- Spouse: Virginia O'Connor (m. 1947)

Signature
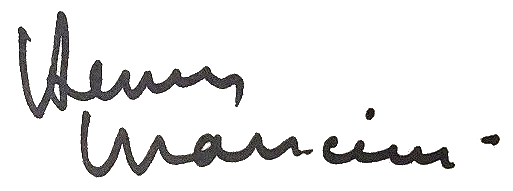

Henry Mancini (/mænˈsiːni/ man-SEE-nee; born Enrico Nicola Mancini; April 16, 1924 – June 14, 1994) was an American composer, conductor, arranger, pianist and flutist, best known as a composer of film and television scores. Often cited as one of the greatest composers in the history of film, he won four Academy Awards, a Golden Globe, and twenty Grammy Awards, plus a posthumous Grammy Lifetime Achievement Award in 1995.

His best-known works include the theme and soundtrack for the television series Peter Gunn, as well as the music for The Pink Panther film series ("The Pink Panther Theme") and the song "Moon River" from Breakfast at Tiffany's. The Music from Peter Gunn won the inaugural Grammy Award for Album of the Year in 1958. "Moon River" and the title song from Days of Wine and Roses, both cowritten with lyricist Johnny Mercer, won the Grammy Awards for both Record of the Year and Song of the Year in 1961 and 1963 respectively. Mancini enjoyed a long collaboration in composing for film director Blake Edwards. Mancini also scored a No. 1 single on the Hot 100 in 1969 with his arrangement and recording of the "Love Theme from Romeo and Juliet".

== Early life ==
Henry Mancini was born on April 16, 1924, as Enrico Nicola Mancini in Cleveland, Ohio, and raised in West Aliquippa, Pennsylvania. Both his parents were Italian immigrants from Southern Italy; his father Quintiliano "Quinto" Mancini, originally from Scanno, Abruzzo, was a laborer at the Jones and Laughlin Steel Company and amateur musician who first moved to the U.S. as a teenager around 1910, whereas his mother Anna (née Pece) moved to the U.S. from Forlì del Sannio, Molise, as an infant.

At age eight, Mancini began learning the piccolo. Mancini said that hearing Rudolph G. Kopp's score in the 1935 Cecil B. DeMille film The Crusades inspired him to pursue film music composition despite his father's wishes for him to become a teacher.

At age 12, he began studying piano and orchestral arrangement under Pittsburgh concert pianist and Stanley Theatre (now Benedum Center) conductor Max Adkins. Not only did Mancini produce arrangements for the Stanley Theatre bands, but he also wrote an arrangement for Benny Goodman, an up-and-coming bandleader introduced to him by Adkins. According to Mancini biographer John Caps, the young Mancini "preferred music arranging to any kind of musical performance, but taking apart a Chopin mazurka or Schumann sonata in order to play it helped him see...how the puzzle of form, meter, melody, harmony, and counterpoint had been solved by previous composers."

After graduating from Aliquippa High School in 1942, Mancini first attended the Carnegie Institute of Technology (now Carnegie Mellon University) in Pittsburgh. Later that year, Mancini transferred to the Juilliard School in New York City following a successful audition in which he performed a Beethoven sonata and an improvisation on "Night and Day" by Cole Porter. Because he could only take orchestration and composition courses in his second year, Mancini studied only piano in his first year at Juilliard, in a condition Caps called "aimless and oppressed—a far cry from Adkins's enabling protective environment."

After turning 18, Mancini enlisted in the United States Army Air Forces in 1943. While in basic training in Atlantic City, New Jersey, he met musicians being recruited by Glenn Miller. Owing to a recommendation by Miller, Mancini was first assigned to the 28th Air Force Band before being reassigned overseas to the 1306th Engineers Brigade in France. In 1945, he helped liberate the Mauthausen-Gusen concentration camp in Austria.

== Career ==
Newly discharged from the military, Mancini entered the music industry. In 1946, he became a pianist and arranger for the newly re-formed Glenn Miller Orchestra, led by Tex Beneke. After World War II, Mancini broadened his skills in composition, counterpoint, harmony and orchestration during studies, opening with the composers Ernst Krenek and Mario Castelnuovo-Tedesco.

In 1952, Mancini joined Universal-International's music department. During the next six years, he contributed music to over 100 movies, most notably Creature from the Black Lagoon, The Creature Walks Among Us, It Came from Outer Space, Tarantula, This Island Earth, The Glenn Miller Story (for which he received his first Academy Award nomination), The Benny Goodman Story and Orson Welles' Touch of Evil. His first hit as a pop songwriter was a single by Guy Lombardo and His Royal Canadians titled "I Won't Let You Out of My Heart".

Mancini left Universal-International to work as an independent composer/arranger in 1958. Soon afterward, he scored the television series Peter Gunn for writer/producer Blake Edwards. This was the genesis of a relationship in which Edwards and Mancini collaborated on 30 films over 35 years. Along with Alex North, Elmer Bernstein, Leith Stevens and Johnny Mandel, Henry Mancini was a pioneer of the inclusion of jazz elements in the late romantic orchestral film and television scoring prevalent at the time. Mancini's scores for Blake Edwards included Breakfast at Tiffany's (with the standard "Moon River") and Days of Wine and Roses (with the title song, "Days of Wine and Roses"), as well as Experiment in Terror, The Pink Panther (and all of its sequels), The Great Race, The Party, 10 (including "It's Easy to Say") and Victor Victoria. Another director with whom Mancini had a longstanding partnership was Stanley Donen (Charade, Arabesque, Two for the Road). Mancini also composed for Howard Hawks (Man's Favorite Sport?, Hatari! – which included the "Baby Elephant Walk"), Martin Ritt (The Molly Maguires), Vittorio de Sica (Sunflower), Norman Jewison (Gaily, Gaily), Paul Newman (Sometimes a Great Notion, The Glass Menagerie), Stanley Kramer (Oklahoma Crude), George Roy Hill (The Great Waldo Pepper), Arthur Hiller (Silver Streak), Ted Kotcheff (Who Is Killing the Great Chefs of Europe?), and others. Mancini's score for the Alfred Hitchcock film Frenzy (1972) in Bachian organ andante, for organ and an orchestra of strings was rejected and replaced by Ron Goodwin's work.

Mancini scored many television movies, including The Moneychangers, The Thorn Birds and The Shadow Box. He wrote many television themes, including Mr. Lucky (starring John Vivyan and Ross Martin), NBC Mystery Movie, Tic Tac Dough (1990 version), Once Is Not Enough, and What's Happening!! In the 1984–85 television season, four series featured original Mancini themes: Newhart, Hotel, Remington Steele, and Ripley's Believe It or Not. Mancini also composed the "Viewer Mail" theme for Late Night with David Letterman. Mancini composed the theme for NBC Nightly News used beginning in 1975, and a different theme by him, titled Salute to the President was used by NBC News for its election coverage (including primaries and conventions) from 1976 to 1992. Salute to the President was published only in a school-band arrangement, although Mancini performed it frequently with symphony orchestras on his concert tours.

Songs with music by Mancini were staples of the easy listening radio format from the 1960s to the 1980s. To advertisers, Mancini's style symbolized the bright, confident, hospitable voice of bourgeois America. Some of the artists who have recorded Mancini songs include Duane Eddy, Andy Williams, Paul Anka, Pat Boone, Anita Bryant, Jack Jones, Frank Sinatra, Perry Como, Connie Francis, Eydie Gorme, Steve Lawrence, Trini Lopez, George Maharis, Johnny Mathis, Jerry Vale, Ray Conniff, Quincy Jones, The Lennon Sisters, The Lettermen, Herb Alpert, Eddie Cano, Frank Chacksfield, Warren Covington, Sarah Vaughan, Shelly Manne, James Moody, Percy Faith, Ferrante & Teicher, Horst Jankowski, Andre Kostelanetz, Peter Nero, Liberace, Mantovani, Tony Bennett, Julie London, Wayne Newton, Arthur Fiedler, Secret Agent and the Boston Pops Orchestra, Peggy Lee, The Carpenters, Shirley Bassey, and Matt Monro. The Anita Kerr Quartet won a Grammy award (1965) for their album We Dig Mancini, a cover of his songs. Lawrence Welk held Mancini in very high regard, and frequently featured Mancini's music on The Lawrence Welk Show (Mancini made at least two guest appearances on the show). Mancini briefly hosted his own musical variety TV show in a similar format to Welk's, The Mancini Generation, which aired in syndication during the 1972–73 season.

Mancini recorded over 90 albums, in styles ranging from big band to light classical to pop. Eight of these albums were certified gold by the Recording Industry Association of America. He had a 20-year contract with RCA Victor, resulting in 60 commercial record albums that made him a household name among artists of easy listening music. Mancini's earliest recordings in the 1950s and early 1960s were of the jazz idiom; with the success of Peter Gunn, Mr. Lucky, and Breakfast at Tiffany's, Mancini shifted to recording primarily his own music in record albums and film soundtracks. (Relatively little of his music was written for recordings compared to the amount that was written for film and television.) Beginning with his 1969 hit arrangement of Nino Rota's A Time for Us (as his only Billboard Hot 100 top-ten entry, the No. 1 hit "Love Theme from Romeo and Juliet") and its accompanying album A Warm Shade of Ivory, Mancini began to function more as a piano soloist and easy-listening artist recording music primarily written by other people. In this period, for two of his best-selling albums he was joined by trumpet virtuoso and The Tonight Show bandleader Doc Severinsen.

Among Mancini's orchestral scores are (Lifeforce, The Great Mouse Detective, Sunflower, Tom and Jerry: The Movie, Molly Maguires, The Hawaiians), and darker themes (Experiment in Terror, The White Dawn, Wait Until Dark, The Night Visitor).

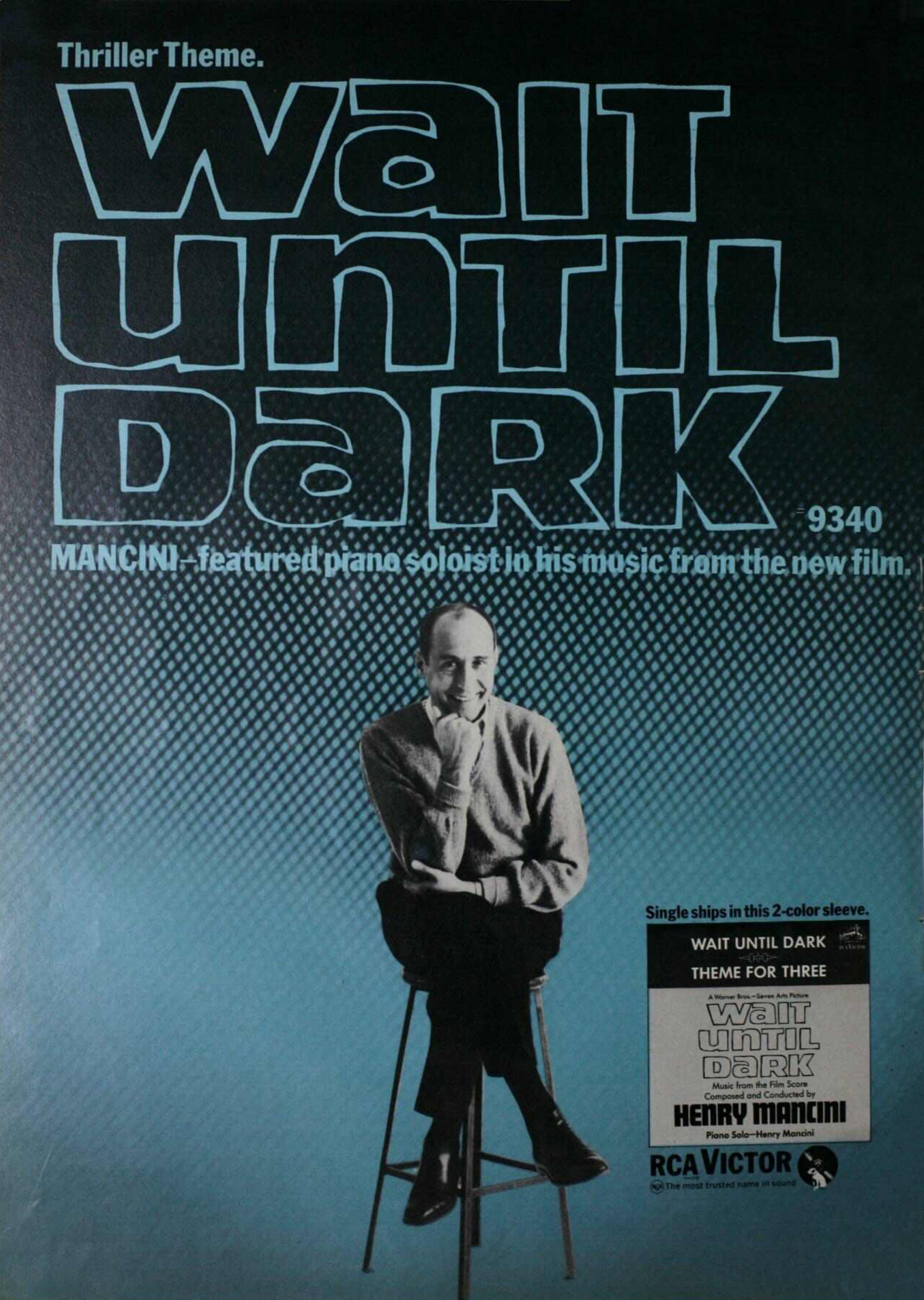
Billboard advertisement, October 14, 1967

Mancini was also a concert performer, conducting over fifty engagements per year, resulting in over 600 symphony performances during his lifetime. He conducted nearly all of the leading symphony orchestras of the world, including the London Symphony Orchestra, the Israel Philharmonic, the Boston Pops, the Los Angeles Philharmonic and the Royal Philharmonic Orchestra. One of his favorites was the Minnesota Orchestra, where he debuted the Thorn Birds Suite in June 1983. He appeared in 1966, 1980 and 1984 in command performances for the British royal family. He also toured several times with Johnny Mathis and also with Andy Williams, who had both sung many of Mancini's songs; Mathis and Mancini collaborated on the 1986 album The Hollywood Musicals. In 1987 he conducted an impromptu charity concert in London in aid of Children In Need. The concert included Tchaikovsky's 1812 Overture with firework accompaniment over the River Thames.

=== Cameos ===
Shortly before his death in 1994, he made a one-off cameo appearance in the first season of the sitcom series Frasier, as a call-in patient to Dr. Frasier Crane's radio show. Mancini voiced the character Al, who speaks with a melancholy drawl and hates the sound of his own voice, in the episode "Guess Who's Coming to Breakfast?" Moments after Mancini's cameo ends, Frasier's radio broadcast plays "Moon River".

Mancini also had an uncredited performance as a pianist in the 1967 film Gunn, based on the Peter Gunn television series.

In the 1966 Pink Panther cartoon Pink, Plunk, Plink, the panther commandeered an orchestra and proceeded to conduct Mancini's theme for the series. At the end, the shot switched to rare live action, and Mancini was seen alone applauding in the audience. Mancini also made a brief appearance in the title sequence of 1993's Son of the Pink Panther, allowing the panther to conduct Bobby McFerrin in performing the film's theme tune.

In 1969 at the 41st Academy Awards ceremony, Mancini played the harpsichord in a special number. Marni Nixon sang the rules for nomination in the category of Best Score of a Musical Motion Picture (Original or Adaptation), and together they sang the names of the films and musicians nominated. Mancini was the music director of the 41st Academy Awards broadcast.

== Personal life and death ==
Mancini married singer Virginia "Ginny" O'Connor in 1947, who died on October 25, 2021, at age 97. They had three children, Christopher, Monica, and Felice.

Mancini died of pancreatic cancer and liver cancer in Los Angeles on June 14, 1994. He was working at the time on the Broadway stage version of Victor/Victoria, which he never saw on stage.

== Legacy ==
Henry Mancini often served as mentor to other composers, most notably Gary Stockdale.

Mancini created a scholarship at UCLA, and some of his library and works are archived in the music library at UCLA, with additional materials preserved at the Library of Congress.

In 1996, the Henry Mancini Institute, an academy for young music professionals, was founded by Jack Elliott in Mancini's honor, and was later under the direction of composer-conductor Patrick Williams. By the mid-2000s, however, the institute could not sustain itself and closed its doors on December 30, 2006. The American Society of Composers, Authors and Publishers (ASCAP) Foundation "Henry Mancini Music Scholarship" has been awarded annually since 2001.

In 2005, the Henry Mancini Arts Academy was opened as a division of the Lincoln Park Performing Arts Center. The center is located in Midland, Pennsylvania, minutes away from Mancini's hometown of Aliquippa. The Henry Mancini Arts Academy is an evening-and-weekend performing arts program for children from pre-K to grade 12, with some classes also available for adults. The program includes dance, voice, musical theater, and instrumental lessons.

Scanno, his father's hometown, dedicated a street to Mancini in 2017.

The American Film Institute ranked Mancini's songs "Moon River" No. 4 and "Days of Wine and Roses" No. 39 on their 100 Years...100 Songs list, and his score for The Pink Panther No. 20 on their list of the greatest film scores. His scores for Breakfast at Tiffany's (1961), Charade (1963), Hatari! (1962), Touch of Evil (1958) and Wait Until Dark (1967) were also nominated for the list.

== Awards and nominations ==
Mancini was nominated for 72 Grammy Awards and won 20. He was nominated for 18 Academy Awards and won four. He also won a Golden Globe Award and was nominated for two Emmy Awards.

In 1961, Mancini won two Academy Awards, one for "Moon River" for Best Original Song and one for Best Scoring of a Dramatic or Comedy Picture for the movie Breakfast at Tiffany's. In 1962, he won Best Original Song again, this time for "Days of Wine and Roses". He won Best Original Song Score and Its Adaptation or Best Adaptation Score again in 1982 for the movie Victor/Victoria.

In 1989, Mancini received the Golden Plate Award of the American Academy of Achievement.

In 1997, Mancini was posthumously awarded an honorary doctorate of music from Berklee College of Music.

On April 13, 2004, the United States Postal Service honored Mancini with a thirty-seven cent commemorative stamp. Painted by artist Victor Stabin, the stamp shows Mancini conducting in front of a list of some of his film and television themes.

== Discography ==
=== Albums ===
- The Versatile Henry Mancini (Liberty LST-7121, 1957)
- Sousa in Stereo (Warner Bros. BS-1209, 1958)
- March Step in Hi-Fi (Warner Bros. BS-1312, 1959)
- The Music from Peter Gunn (RCA Victor LSP-1956, 1959)
- More Music from Peter Gunn (RCA Victor LSP-2040, 1959)
- The Mancini Touch (RCA Victor LSP-2101, 1959)
- The Blues and the Beat (RCA Victor LSP-2147, 1960)
- Music from Mr. Lucky, (RCA Victor LSP-2198, 1960)
- Mr. Lucky Goes Latin (RCA Victor LSP-2360, 1961)
- Combo! (RCA Victor LSP-2258, 1962)
- Our Man in Hollywood (RCA Victor LSP-2604, 1963)
- Uniquely Mancini (RCA Victor LSP-2692, 1963)
- The Best of Mancini [compilation] (RCA Victor LSP-2693, 1964)
- Mancini Plays Mancini (RCA Camden CAS-2158, 1967)
- Everybody's Favorite (RCA Camden CXS-9034, 1972)
- The Concert Sound of Henry Mancini (RCA Victor LSP-2897, 1964)
- Dear Heart (And Other Songs About Love) (RCA Victor LSP-2990, 1965)
- The Latin Sound of Henry Mancini (RCA Victor LSP-3356, 1965)
- The Academy Award Songs (RCA Victor LSP-6013, 1966)
- A Merry Mancini Christmas (RCA Victor LSP-3612, 1966)
- Mancini '67: The Big Band Sound of Henry Mancini (RCA Victor LSP-3694, 1967)
- Music of Hawaii (RCA Victor LSP-3713, 1967)
- Encore! More of the Concert Sound of Henry Mancini (RCA Victor LSP-3887, 1967)
- Mancini Plays Mancini (RCA Camden CAS-2158, 1967)
- The Mancini Sound (RCA Victor LSP-3943, 1968)
- The Big Latin Band of Henry Mancini (RCA Victor LSP-4049, 1968)
- Debut! Henry Mancini Conducting the First Recording of the Philadelphia Orchestra Pops (RCA Red Seal LSC-3106, 1969)
- A Warm Shade of Ivory (RCA Victor LSP-4140, 1969)
- Six Hours Past Sunset (RCA Victor LSP-4239, 1969)
- Mancini Country (RCA Victor LSP-4307, 1970)
- Theme from "Z" and Other Film Music (RCA Victor LSP-4350, 1970)
- Mancini Plays the Theme from "Love Story" (RCA Victor LSP-4466, 1970)
- This Is Henry Mancini [compilation] (RCA Victor VPS-6029, 1970)
- Mancini Magic (RCA Camden CXS-9005, 1971)
- Dream of You (RCA Camden CAS-2510, 1971)
- Mancini Concert (RCA Victor LSP-4542, 1971)
- Brass on Ivory with Doc Severinsen (RCA Victor LSP-4629, 1972)
- Big Screen - Little Screen (RCA Victor LSP-4630, 1972)
- Music from the TV Series "The Mancini Generation" (RCA Victor LSP-4689, 1972)
- Brass, Ivory & Strings with Doc Severinsen (RCA Victor APL1-0098, 1973)
- Film Music By Mancini (RCA Camden ADL2-0293, 1973)
- Country Gentleman (RCA Victor APL1-0270, 1974)
- Hangin' Out (RCA Victor CPL1-0672, 1974)
- Pure Gold [compilation] (RCA ANL1-0980, 1975)
- Symphonic Soul (RCA Victor APL1-1025, 1975)
- A Legendary Performer [compilation] (RCA CPL1-1843, 1976)
- The Cop Show Themes (RCA Victor APL1-1896, 1976)
- Mancini's Angels (RCA Victor CPL1-2290, 1977)
- The Theme Scene (RCA Victor APL1-3052, 1978)
- In the Pink with James Galway (RCA Red Seal CRC1-5315, 1984)
- The Hollywood Musicals with Johnny Mathis (Columbia CK-40372, 1986)
- As Time Goes by and Other Classic Movie Love Songs (RCA Victor 09026-60974-2, 1992)

=== Hit singles ===
List of singles, with selected chart positions
Title	Year	Peak chart positions				
Title	Year	US	US CB	US AC	AUS	UK
"Mr. Lucky"	1960	21	20	—	—	—
"High Time"	1960	—	—	—	—	—
"Theme from The Great Imposter"	1961	90	87	—	—	—
"Moon River"	1961	11	5	1	—	44
"Experiment In Terror"	1962	—	—	—	—	—
"Theme from Hatari!"	1962	95	89	—	—	—
"Days of Wine and Roses"	1963	33	29	10	—	—
"Banzai Pipeline"	1963	93	98	—	—	—
"Charade"	1963	36	43	15	—	—
"The Pink Panther Theme"	1964	31	54	10	—	—
"A Shot in the Dark"	1964	97	—	—	—	—
"How Soon"	1964	—	—	—	—	10
"Dear Heart"	1964	77	39	14	—	—
"The Sweetheart Tree"	1965	—	89	23	—	—
"La Raspa"	1965	—	—	—	—	—
"Moment to Moment"	1965	—	—	27	—	—
"Hawaii (Main Theme)"	1966	—	—	6	—	—
"Two for the Road"	1967	—	—	17	—	—
"Wait Until Dark"	1967	—	—	4	—	—
"Norma La De Guadalajara"	1968	—	—	21	—	—
"A Man, a Horse and a Gun"	1968	—	—	36	—	—
"Love Theme from Romeo and Juliet"	1969	1	1	1	10	—
"Moonlight Sonata"	1969	87	96	15	—	—
"There Isn't Enough to Go Around"	1969	—	—	39	—	—
"Theme from Z (Life Goes On)"	1970	—	—	17	—	—
"Theme from The Molly Maguires"	1970	—	—	—	—	—
"Darling Lili"	1970	—	—	26	—	—
"Love Story"	1971	13	11	2	21	—
"Theme from Cade's County"	1972	—	—	14	—	42
"Theme from Nicholas and Alexandra"	1972	—	—	—	—	—
"Theme from the Mancini Generation"	1972	—	—	38	—	—
"All His Children" (with Charley Pride)	1972	92	95	—	—	—
"Oklahoma Crude"	1973	—	—	38	—	—
"Hangin' Out" (with the Mouldy Seven)	1974	—	—	21	—	—
"Once Is Not Enough"	1975	—	—	45	—	—
"African Symphony"	1976	—	—	40	—	—
"Slow Hot Wind"	1976	—	—	38	—	—
"Theme from Charlie's Angels"	1977	45	73	22	—	—
"Ravel's Bolero"	1980	—	59	—	76	—
"The Thornbirds Theme"	1984	—	—	—	—	23
"—" denotes a title that did not chart, or was not released in that territory.

=== Ballets ===
- Coffee House (1959), written for the Gene Kelly Show

=== Soundtracks ===
Most of Mancini's scores were not released on LP soundtrack albums. His television movie music albums were not soundtrack albums but are titled "Music from ..." or "Music from the Motion Picture ..." He routinely retained the rights to his music. Mancini's contracts allowed him to release his own albums for which he rearranged the score music into arrangements more appropriate for listening outside of the context of the film/theater. Actual film scores using players from Hollywood unions recording under major motion picture studio contracts were expensive to release on LP (ex: the soundtrack for Our Man Flint (not a Mancini score) cost $1 more than other LP albums of the day). Many soundtrack albums used to claim "Original Soundtrack" or words to that effect, but were not necessarily the actual soundtrack recordings. These albums were usually recorded with a smaller orchestra than that used for the actual scoring (ex: Dimitri Tiomkin's score to The Alamo). However, many Hollywood musicians were featured on Mancini's albums recorded in RCA's Hollywood recording studios and faux "Original Soundtrack" albums. Eventually some of his scores and faux "Original Soundtrack" scores by numerous composers were released in limited edition CDs.

- 10, Warner Bros. Records – BSK 3399
- Arabesque, RCA Victor LSP-3623
- Bachelor in Paradise, Film Score Monthly FSMCD vol. 7 nr. 18
- Breakfast at Tiffany's, RCA Victor LSP-2362
- Charade, RCA Victor LSP-2755
- Darling Lili, RCA LSPX-1000
- Experiment in Terror, RCA Victor LSP-2442
- Frenzy (along with the Ron Goodwin score), Quartet Records QR505
- Gaily, Gaily, United Artists UAS-5202
- The Glass Menagerie, MCA MCAD-6222
- The Great Mouse Detective, Varèse Sarabande/MCA VSD-5359
- The Great Race, RCA Victor LSP-3402
- The Great Waldo Pepper, MCA MCA-2085
- Gunn ...Number One!, RCA Victor LSP-3840
- Harry & Son, Quartet Records QRSCE-023
- Hatari!, RCA Victor LSP-2559
- The Hawaiians, United Artists UAS-5210
- High Time, RCA Victor LSP-2314
- Lifeforce, Varèse Sarabande STV-81249
- Me, Natalie, Columbia OS-03350
- The Molly Maguires, Paramount PAS-6000
- Mommie Dearest, Real Gone Music RGM-0640
- Mr. Hobbs Takes a Vacation, Intrada special collection vol. 11
- Nightwing, Varèse Sarabande VCL-0309-1091
- Oklahoma Crude, RCA Victor APL1-0271
- The Party, RCA Victor LSP-3997
- The Pink Panther, RCA Victor LSP-2795
- The Return of the Pink Panther, RCA Victor ABL1-0968
- The Pink Panther Strikes Again, United Artists UA-LA694
- Revenge of the Pink Panther, United Artists UA-LA913-H
- Santa Claus: The Movie, EMI America SJ-17177
- Silver Streak, Intrada special collection vol. 5
- Sometimes a Great Notion, Decca DL-79185
- Son of the Pink Panther, Milan/BMG 74321-16461-2
- Sunflower, Avco Embassy AVE-0-11001
- Sunset, Quartet Records QRSCE-045
- The Thief Who Came to Dinner, Warner Bros. BS-2700
- The Thorn Birds, Varèse Sarabande/UMG 302 066 564-2
- Tom and Jerry – The Movie, MCA MCAD-10721
- Touch of Evil, Challenge CHL-602
- Two for the Road, RCA Victor LSP-3802
- Victor Victoria, GNP Crescendo GNPD-8038
- Visions of Eight, RCA Victor ABL1-0231
- W.C. Fields and Me, MCA MCA-2092
- What Did You Do in the War, Daddy?, RCA Victor LSP-3648
- Who Is Killing the Great Chefs of Europe?, Epic SE-35692
- Without a Clue, BSX BSXCD-8832

=== Filmography ===
- The Raiders (1952)
- Girls in the Night (1953)
- It Came from Outer Space (1953)
- The Glenn Miller Story (1953)
- Abbott and Costello Go to Mars (1953)
- Law and Order (1953)
- City Beneath the Sea (1953)
- Destry (1954)
- Creature from the Black Lagoon (1954)
- The Private War of Major Benson (1955)
- The Benny Goodman Story (1956)
- The Creature Walks Among Us (1956)
- Rock, Pretty Baby (1956)
- Summer Love (1957)
- Damn Citizen (1958)
- Touch of Evil (1958)
- The Big Beat (1958)
- Operation Petticoat (1959)
- High Time (1960)
- The Great Impostor (1960)
- Breakfast at Tiffany's (1961)
- Bachelor in Paradise (1961)
- Experiment in Terror (1962)
- Mr. Hobbs Takes a Vacation (1962)
- Hatari! (1962)
- Days of Wine and Roses (1962)
- Soldier in the Rain (1963)
- Charade (1963)
- The Pink Panther (1963)
- Man's Favorite Sport? (1964)
- A Shot in the Dark (1964)
- Dear Heart (1964)
- The Great Race (1965)
- Moment to Moment (1966)
- Arabesque (1966)
- What Did You Do in the War, Daddy? (1966)
- Two for the Road (1967)
- Gunn ...Number One! (1967)
- Wait Until Dark (1967)
- The Party (1968)
- Me, Natalie (1969)
- Gaily, Gaily (1969)
- The Molly Maguires (1970)
- Sunflower (1970)
- The Hawaiians (1970)
- Darling Lili (1970)
- The Night Visitor (1971)
- Sometimes a Great Notion (1971)
- Frenzy (Rejected Score) (1972)
- The Thief Who Came To Dinner (1973)
- Visions of Eight (1973)
- Oklahoma Crude (1973)
- That's Entertainment! (1974)
- The White Dawn (1974)
- The Girl from Petrovka (1974)
- 99 and 44/100% Dead (1974)
- The Great Waldo Pepper (1975)
- The Return of the Pink Panther (1975)
- Jacqueline Susann's Once Is Not Enough (1975)
- W.C. Fields and Me (1976)
- Silver Streak (1976)
- The Pink Panther Strikes Again (1976)
- Angela (1977)
- House Calls (1978)
- Revenge of the Pink Panther (1978)
- Who Is Killing the Great Chefs of Europe? (1978)
- The Prisoner of Zenda (1979)
- Nightwing (1979)
- 10 (1979)
- Little Miss Marker (1980)
- A Change of Seasons (1980)
- Back Roads (1981)
- S.O.B. (1981)
- Condorman (1981)
- Mommie Dearest (1981)
- Victor Victoria (1982)
- Trail of the Pink Panther (1982)
- Better Late Than Never (1983)
- Second Thoughts (1983)
- Curse of the Pink Panther (1983)
- The Man Who Loved Women (1983)
- Harry & Son (1984)
- That's Dancing (1985)
- Lifeforce (1985)
- Santa Claus: The Movie (1985)
- The Great Mouse Detective (1986) - First score for an animated film
- A Fine Mess (1986)
- That's Life! (1986)
- Blind Date (1987)
- The Glass Menagerie (1987)
- Sunset (1988)
- Without a Clue (1988)
- Physical Evidence (1989)
- Welcome Home (1989)
- Ghost Dad (1990)
- Fear (1990)
- Switch (1991)
- Married to It (1991)
- Tom and Jerry: The Movie (1992)
- Son of the Pink Panther (1993)

=== Television themes ===
- Peter Gunn (1958)
- Mr. Lucky (1959)
- Man of the World (1962)
- The Richard Boone Show (1963)
- Blaulicht (1968)
- The Pink Panther Show (1969)
- Curiosity Shop (1971)
- Cade's County (1971)
- The NBC Mystery Movie (1971)
- The Blue Knight (1975)
- What's Happening!! (1976)
- Kingston: Confidential (1977)
- Sanford Arms (1977)
- The All-New Pink Panther Show (1978)
- NBC Nightly News (1978)
- Newhart (1982, one of the few shows to credit Mancini in the opening credits)
- Remington Steele (1982)
- Ripley's Believe It or Not! (1982)
- Hotel (1983)
- Pink Panther and Sons (1984)
- What's Happening Now!! (1985)
- Tic Tac Dough (1990)
- Julie (1992)
- Pink Panther and Pals (2010)

== Bibliography ==
- Mancini, Henry. Sounds and Scores: A Practical Guide to Professional Orchestration (1962)
- Mancini, Henry & Lees, Gene (2001) [1989]. Did They Mention The Music? The Autobiography of Henry Mancini (Updated ed.). New York City: Cooper Square Books. ISBN 1461732115.

== Sources ==
- Caps, John (2012), Henry Mancini: Reinventing Film Music, Champaign, Illinois: University of Illinois Press, ISBN 978-0252093845
- Liner notes to RCA Victor LPM/LSP-1956
- Liner notes to RCA Victor LPM/LSP-3840
