= Voices in Love =

Studio album by the Four Freshmen
- Released: October 6, 1958
- Genre: Vocal jazz
- Label: Capitol

The Four Freshmen chronology
| The Freshman Year (1958) | Voices in Love (1958) | In Person (1958) |

Voices in Love is an album by the Four Freshmen. It was issued by Capitol Records on October 6, 1958, and re-released in 1998 as a twin album together with Love Lost.

== Track listing ==
Side one

1. "I'm Always Chasing Rainbows" (Harry Carroll, Joseph McCarty)
2. "There Is No Greater Love" (Isham Jones, Marty Symes)
3. "Moonlight" (Milton Kellem, Tony Iavello)
4. "It Could Happen to You" (Johnny Burke, Jimmy Van Heusen)
5. "Out of Nowhere" (Johnny Green, Edward Heyman)
6. "In the Still of the Night" (Cole Porter)

Side two

1. "I'll Remember April" (Gene de Paul, Patricia Johnston, Don Raye)
2. "While You Are Gone" (Lucky Thompson)
3. "Warm" (Sidney Jacobson, Jim Krondes)
4. "Time Was (Duermé)" (Miguel Prado, Gabriel Luna, Bob Russell)
5. "You're All I See" (Russell Faith)
6. "I Heard You Cried Last Night (And So Did I)" (Ted Grouya, Jerrie Kruger)

== Personnel ==
- Don Barbour – vocals, guitar
- Ross Barbour – vocals, drums
- Bob Flanigan – vocals, trombone, bass
- Ken Albers – vocals, trumpet, bass
- Al Hendrickson - guitar
- Geoff Clarkson - piano
- Red Mitchell - bass
- Shelly Manne - drums

Arranged and conducted by Dick Reynolds

== Sources ==
- Lambert, Philip (2007). Inside the Music of Brian Wilson: The Songs, Sounds, and Influences of the Beach Boys' Founding Genius. London: Continuum. ISBN 978-0-8264-1877-7 – via the Internet Archive.
