= Voices in Fun =

Studio album by The Four Freshmen
- Released: 1961
- Genre: Vocal jazz
- Label: Capitol

Voices in Fun is an album released by The Four Freshmen in 1961 on Capitol Records. It was nominated for a 1961 Grammy Award in the Best Performance by a Vocal Group category.

== Track listing ==
1. “I Want to Be Happy” (Vincent Youmans, Irving Caesar)
2. “Ole Buttermilk Sky” (Hoagy Carmichael, Jack Brooks)
3. “I Can't Give You Anything but Love, Baby” (Jimmy McHugh, Dorothy Fields)
4. “You Make Me Feel So Young” (Josef Myrow, Mack Gordon)
5. “Save the Bones for Henry Jones” (Danny Barker, Michael Goldsen, Henry Jones)
6. “Swinging on a Star” (Jimmy Van Heusen, Johnny Burke)
7. “On the Sunny Side of the Street” (Jimmy McHugh, Dorothy Fields)
8. “Mañana” (Peggy Lee, Dave Barbour)
9. “On the Atchison, Topeka and the Santa Fe” (Harry Warren, Johnny Mercer)
10. “Aren't You Glad You're You?” (Jimmy Van Heusen, Johnny Burket)
11. “Happy Talk” (Richard Rodgers, Oscar Hammerstein II)
12. “Ac-Cent-Tchu-Ate the Positive” (Harold Arlen, Johnny Mercer)

== Personnel ==
- Bill Comstock – vocals
- Ross Barbour – vocals
- Bob Flanigan – vocals
- Ken Albers – vocals
- Dick Reynolds – vocal arranger
- Billy May Orchestra – conductor, arranger
