= The Four Freshmen and Five Guitars =

Studio album by the Four Freshmen
- Released: October 19, 1959
- Genre: Vocal jazz
- Length: 31:12
- Label: Capitol Records

The Four Freshmen chronology
In Person (1959)	The Four Freshmen and Five Guitars (1959)	Love Lost (1960)

Professional ratings
Review scores
Source	Rating
AllMusic	3/5 stars
The Encyclopedia of Popular Music	2/5 stars

The Four Freshmen and Five Guitars is an album by the Four Freshmen, released on October 19, 1959.

== Chart performance ==
The Four Freshmen and Five Guitars debuted on Billboard magazine's Mono Action Albums chart in the issue dated January 11, 1960, peaking at No. 40 before dropping out the following week. It marked their final charting album.

== Track listing ==
Side one

1. "Rain" (Eugene Ford, Carey Morgan, Arthur Swanstrom) – 2:24
2. "The More I See You" (Harry Warren, Mack Gordon) – 3:09
3. "This October" (Bobby Troup) – 2:12
4. "Don't Worry 'bout Me" (Rube Bloom, Ted Koehler) – 2:54
5. "It's a Pity to Say Goodnight" (Billy Reid, Mack Gordon) – 2:08
6. "Oh Lonely Winter" (Bill Comstock, Kenny Albers) – 2:53

Side two

1. "It All Depends on You" (Ray Henderson, Buddy DeSylva, Lew Brown) – 1:56
2. "Nancy (with the Laughing Face)" (Jimmy Van Heusen, Phil Silvers) – 3:03
3. "I Never Knew" (Ted Fio Rito, Gus Kahn) – 1:53
4. "Invitation" (Bronislaw Kaper, Paul Francis Webster) – 3:03
5. "I Understand" (Mabel Wayne, Kim Gannon) – 3:12
6. "Come Rain or Come Shine" (Harold Arlen, Johnny Mercer) – 2:22

== Personnel ==
- Don Barbour - vocals
- Ross Barbour - vocals
- Bob Flanigan - vocals
- Ken Albers - vocals
- Jack Marshall - arranger
- Herb Ellis, George Van Eps, Bobby Gibbons, Al Hendrickson, Barney Kessel, Bill Pitman, Howard Roberts, Tommy Tedesco, Al Viola - guitar
- Larry Bunker - vibes
- Red Mitchell - bass guitar
- Shelly Manne, Jack Sperling - drums

Recorded: June 17, 1959, Los Angeles.

== Charts ==
Chart peaks for The Four Freshmen and Five Guitars
Chart (1960)	Peak position
US Billboard Top LP's: Mono Action Albums	40

== Sources ==
- Lambert, Philip (2007). Inside the Music of Brian Wilson: The Songs, Sounds, and Influences of the Beach Boys' Founding Genius. London: Continuum. ISBN 978-0-8264-1877-7 – via the Internet Archive.
