= Road Show (album) =

Live album by Stan Kenton and His Orchestra, June Christy and The Four Freshmen
- Released: February 1960
- Recorded: October 10, 1959
- Venue: Elliot Hall, Purdue University, Lafayette, IN
- Genre: Jazz
- Label: Capitol TBO/STBO 1327
- Producer: Lee Gillette with John Palladino & Bill Wagner

Stan Kenton chronology
Viva Kenton! (1959)	Road Show (1960)	Two Much! (1960)

June Christy chronology
Ballads for Night People (1959)	Road Show (1960)	The Cool School (1960)

The Four Freshmen chronology
Voices and Brass (1960)	Road Show (1960)	First Affair (1960)

Road Show is a live album by bandleader and pianist Stan Kenton and His Orchestra with vocalists June Christy and The Four Freshmen featuring a concert recorded at the Purdue University in 1959 and released on the Capitol label as a double album.

== Reception ==
Professional ratings
Review scores
Source	Rating
Allmusic	3/5 stars
DownBeat	2.5/5 stars

The Allmusic review by Kenneth M. Cassidy noted "this is a fine live recording from 1959. June Christy is a bit below par due to a cold on the day of the recording".

== Track listing ==
1. "Artistry in Rhythm" (Stan Kenton) – 3:15
2. "Stompin' at the Savoy" (Edgar Sampson, Benny Goodman, Chick Webb, Andy Razaf) – 3:35
3. "My Old Flame" (Arthur Johnston, Sam Coslow) – 4:56
4. "The Big Chase" (Marty Paich) – 9:30
5. "I Want to Be Happy" (Vincent Youmans, Irving Caesar) – 1:05
6. "It's a Most Unusual Day" (Jimmy McHugh, Harold Adamson) – 2:38
7. "Midnight Sun" (Sonny Burke, Lionel Hampton, Johnny Mercer) – 3:53
8. "Kissing Bug" (Billy Strayhorn, Rex Stewart, Joya Sherrill) – 2:46
9. "Bewitched, Bothered and Bewildered" (Richard Rodgers, Lorenz Hart) – 5:28
10. "How High the Moon" (Morgan Lewis, Nancy Hamilton) – 3:09
11. "Day In, Day Out" (Rube Bloom, Johnny Mercer) – 2:39
12. "Angel Eyes" (Matt Dennis, Earl Brent) – 4:00
13. "I'm Always Chasing Rainbows" (Harry Carroll, Joseph McCarthy) – 6:00
14. "Paper Doll" (Johnny S. Black) – 3:17
15. "Them There Eyes" (Maceo Pinkard, Doris Tauber, William Tracey) – 5:38
16. "Love for Sale" (Cole Porter) – 3:40
17. "September Song" (Kurt Weill, Maxwell Anderson) – 4:33
18. "Walkin' Shoes" (Gerry Mulligan) – 3:20
19. "The Peanut Vendor" (Moisés Simons) – 5:05
20. "Artistry in Rhythm" (Kenton) – 1:42

== Personnel ==
- Stan Kenton – piano, conductor (tracks 1–5, 7, 8, 10–12 & 16–20)
- June Christy – vocals (tracks 5–10 & 17–19)
- The Four Freshmen – vocal group (tracks 11–15 & 17–19)
  - Ken Albers
  - Don Barbour
  - Ross Barbour
  - Bob Flanigan
- Bud Brisbois, Rolf Ericson, Bill Mathieu, Roger Middleton, Dalton Smith – trumpet (tracks 1–5, 7, 8, 10–12 & 16–20)
- Kent Larsen, Archie LeCoque, Don Sebesky – trombone (tracks 1–5, 7, 8, 10–12 & 16–20)
- Jim Amlotte, Bob Knight – bass trombone (tracks 1–5, 7, 8, 10–12 & 16–20)
- Charlie Mariano – alto saxophone (tracks 1–5, 7, 8, 10–12 & 16–20)
- Ronnie Rubin, Bill Trujillo – tenor saxophone (tracks 1–5, 7, 8, 10–12 & 16–20)
- Marvin Holladay, Jack Nimitz – baritone saxophone (tracks 1–5, 7, 8, 10–12 & 16–20)
- Joe Castro – piano (tracks 6 & 10)
- Pete Chivily – bass (tracks 1–12 & 16–20)
- Jimmy Campbell – drums (tracks 1–12 & 16–20)
- Mike Pacheco – Cuban drums (tracks 1–5, 7, 8, 10–12 & 16–20)
