= Love Lost (album) =

Studio album by the Four Freshmen
- Released: May 4, 1959
- Genre: Vocal jazz
- Label: Capitol

The Four Freshmen chronology
The Four Freshmen And Five Guitars (1959)	Love Lost (1959)	Voices and Brass (1960)

Love Lost is a studio album by the American vocal group the Four Freshmen, released on May 4, 1959. Issue at the height of their fame, the album is now considered a "vintage" recording. In the same year, The Four Freshmen won both the Metronome and Playboy polls as top jazz vocal group.

The album was reissued in 1998 on a double CD with Voices in Love.

== Track listing ==
Side one

1. "Love Lost" (Bob Flanigan, Don Barbour, Ross Barbour, Ken Albers)
2. "Spring Is Here" (Richard Rodgers, Lorenz Hart)
3. "I'm a Fool to Want You" (Joel Herron, Frank Sinatra, Jack Wolf)
4. "I Should Care" (Axel Stordahl, Paul Weston, Sammy Cahn)
5. "I Could Have Told You" (Jimmy Van Heusen, Carl Sigman)
6. "If I Ever Love Again" (Russ Carlyle, Richard Reynolds)

Side two

1. "The Gal That Got Away" (Harold Arlen, Ira Gershwin)
2. "When Your Lover Has Gone" (Einar Aaron Swan)
3. "I Wish I Didn't Love You So" (Frank Loesser)
4. "I Wish I Knew" (Harry Warren, Mack Gordon)
5. "I'll Never Smile Again" (Ruth Lowe)
6. "Little Girl Blue" (Richard Rodgers, Lorenz Hart)

== Personnel ==
- Don Barbour – vocals
- Ross Barbour – vocals
- Bob Flanigan – vocals
- Ken Albers – vocals

Vocal arrangements Dick Reynolds and Ken Albers
Music arranged by Dick Reynolds

== Sources ==
- Carr, Ian; Fairweather, Digby; and Priestley, Brian. The Rough Guide to Jazz: 3rd Edition. London: Rough Guides, 2004.
- Feather, Leonard. The Encyclopedia of Jazz. New York: Horizon Press, 1960.
- Lambert, Philip (2007). Inside the Music of Brian Wilson: The Songs, Sounds, and Influences of the Beach Boys' Founding Genius. London: Continuum. ISBN 978-0-8264-1877-7 – via the Internet Archive.
