= Four Freshmen and 5 Trombones =

Studio album by the Four Freshmen
- Released: February 8, 1956
- Genre: Pop, vocal jazz
- Length: 34:08
- Label: Capitol

The Four Freshmen chronology
Voices in Modern (1952)	Four Freshmen and 5 Trombones (1956)	Freshmen Favorites (1956)

Four Freshmen and 5 Trombones is an album by the American vocal group the Four Freshmen. Released on February 8, 1956, it reached number six on the charts and charted for over eight months. It was the first album bought by Brian Wilson, who would be greatly influenced by the Four Freshmen when he formed the Beach Boys. Later, the Four Freshmen were acclaimed as "the most innovative and imitated jazz vocal quartet ever to grace vinyl". Straddling vocal jazz and pop music, they were inducted into the Vocal Group Jazz Hall of Fame in 2001.

The album was rereleased as one of two LPs on one CD.

== Track list ==
Side one

1. "Angel Eyes" (Matt Dennis, Earl Brent) – 3:32
2. "Love Is Just around the Corner" (Lewis Gensler, Leo Robin) – 2:00
3. "Mam'selle" (Edmund Goulding, Mack Gordon) – 3:03
4. "Speak Low" (Kurt Weill, Ogden Nash) – 3:06
5. "The Last Time I Saw Paris" (Jerome Kern, Oscar Hammerstein II) – 2:40
6. "Somebody Loves Me" (George Gershwin, Ballard MacDonald, Buddy DeSylva) – 2:06

Side two

1. "You Stepped Out of a Dream" (Nacio Herb Brown, Gus Kahn) – 2:17
2. "I Remember You" (Victor Schertzinger, Johnny Mercer) – 3:10
3. "Love" (Ralph Blane, Hugh Martin) – 2:45
4. "Love Is Here to Stay" (George Gershwin, Ira Gershwin) – 3:12
5. "You Made Me Love You" (James V. Monaco, Joseph McCarthy) – 2:14
6. "Guilty" (Richard A. Whiting, Harry Akst, Gus Kahn) – 3:33

== Personnel ==
- The Four Freshmen: Don Barbour, Ross Barbour, Bob Flanigan, Ken Errair – vocals
- Frank Rosolino, Harry Betts, Milt Bernhart, Tommy Pederson, George Roberts – trombone
- Claude Williamson – piano
- Barney Kessel – guitar
- Joe Mondragon – bass
- Shelly Manne – drums
- Pete Rugolo – arrangements

== Charts ==
Weekly chart performance
Chart (1956)	Peak position
US The Billboard Best Selling Pop Albums	6

== Sources ==
- Lambert, Philip (2007). Inside the Music of Brian Wilson: The Songs, Sounds, and Influences of the Beach Boys' Founding Genius. London: Continuum. ISBN 978-0-8264-1877-7 – via the Internet Archive.
