= Four Freshmen and Five Saxes =

Studio album by the Four Freshmen
- Released: September 2, 1957
- Genre: Vocal jazz
- Label: Capitol Records

The Four Freshmen chronology
4 Freshmen and 5 Trumpets (1957)	Four Freshmen and Five Saxes (1957)	Voices in Latin (1958)

4 Freshmen and 5 Saxes is an album by the American male vocal band quartet the Four Freshmen, released on September 2, 1957. It reached number 25 on the Billboard Pop Albums chart.

== Track listing ==
Side one

1. "Liza" (George Gershwin, Ira Gershwin, Gus Kahn) – 2:39
2. "You've Got Me Cryin' Again" (Isham Jones, Charles Newman) – 2:50
3. "This Can't Be Love" (Richard Rodgers, Lorenz Hart) – 2:03
4. "The Very Thought of You" (Ray Noble) – 2:34
5. "East of the Sun" (Brooks Bowman) – 3:36
6. "I May Be Wrong" (Henry Sullivan, Harry Ruskin) – 2:54

Side two

1. "There's No One But You" (A H C Croome-Johnson, Redd Evans) – 2:30
2. "Sometimes I'm Happy" (Vincent Youmans, Irving Caesar) – 2:15
3. "For All We Know" (J. Fred Coots, Sam M. Lewis) – 2:33
4. "Lullaby In Rhythm" (Walter Hirsch, Clarence Profit, Edgar Sampson, Benny Goodman) – 2:26
5. "This Love of Mine" (Sol Parker, Hank Sanicola, Frank Sinatra) – 2:26
6. "I Get Along Without You Very Well" (Hoagy Carmichael) – 3:38

== Personnel ==
- Don Barbour – vocals
- Ross Barbour – vocals
- Bob Flanigan – vocals
- Ken Albers – vocals
- Georgie Auld – saxophone
- Gus Bivona – saxophone
- Bob Cooper – saxophone
- Chuck Gentry – saxophone
- Skeets Herfurt – saxophone
- Ted Nash – saxophone
- Dave Pell – saxophone
- Wilbur Schwartz – saxophone
- Bud Shank – saxophone

Tracks 1–6 arranged by Pete Rugolo
Tracks 7–12 arranged by Dick Reynolds
Orchestra and chorus conducted by Belford Hendricks

== Sources ==
- Lambert, Philip (2007). Inside the Music of Brian Wilson: The Songs, Sounds, and Influences of the Beach Boys' Founding Genius. London: Continuum. ISBN 978-0-8264-1877-7 – via the Internet Archive.
