= The Last Time I Saw Paris (song) =

1940 song by Jerome Kern and Oscar Hammerstein II

"The Last Time I Saw Paris" is a song composed by Jerome Kern, with lyrics by Oscar Hammerstein II, published in 1940. It was sung in the 1941 film Lady Be Good by Ann Sothern.

By December 1940, six versions of the song were on the charts, with Kate Smith having exclusive radio rights for the song for six weeks. The song catered to a wartime nostalgia for songs about European cities following the Second World War Battle of France (which brought Paris under Nazi control), with "A Nightingale Sang in Berkeley Square" also proving popular.

The song had not been written for the film, and Hammerstein said the song was "not written to order". It still won the Academy Award for Best Original Song in 1941. This was Kern's second Academy Award for Best Original Song (following his success with "The Way You Look Tonight" in 1936), and Hammerstein's first. Kern was so upset at winning with a song that had not been specifically written for a motion picture, and that had been published and recorded before the film was even released, that he petitioned the Motion Picture Academy to change the rules. Since then, a nominated song has to have been written specifically for the motion picture in which it is performed.

Julie Andrews noted humming the song on the set of Cinderella (1957), only to be approached from behind by Hammerstein telling her that he had meant every word. She said that unlike Rodgers, he was rarely on the set.

The song inspired the title of and figures prominently in the film The Last Time I Saw Paris (1954) when it was sung by Odette Myrtil.

== Notable recordings ==
- Kate Smith (1940)
- Vaughn Monroe (1940)
- Tony Martin (1941)
- Noël Coward (1941)
- Bud Powell - The Genius of Bud Powell (1951)
- The Four Freshmen - 4 Freshmen and 5 Trombones (1955)
- Ann Sothern, from the film sound track
- Dinah Shore in the 1946 film Till the Clouds Roll By.
- Roger Williams - Songs of the Fabulous Fifties (1957)
- Sonny Rollins - The Sound of Sonny (1957)
- Connie Francis - Connie Francis Sings Award Winning Motion Picture Hits (1963)
- Dean Martin - French Style (1962)
- Tony Bennett and Bill Charlap - The Silver Lining: The Songs of Jerome Kern (2015)
- Seth Macfarlane as Brian Griffin - Family Guy: Live in Vegas
