= Guilty (Richard Whiting, Harry Akst and Gus Kahn song) =

Single by Margaret Whiting and Johnny Desmond
- Released: 1946
- Length: 3:11
- Label: Capitol Records
- Songwriters: Richard A. Whiting, Harry Akst, Gus Kahn

"Guilty" is a popular song published in 1931. The music was written by Richard A. Whiting and Harry Akst. The lyrics were written by Gus Kahn. Popular recordings in 1931 were by Ruth Etting, Wayne King and by Russ Columbo.

The song was later popularized by Margaret Whiting (Richard Whiting's daughter) and by Johnny Desmond in 1946. The Margaret Whiting recording was made on October 9, 1946, and released by Capitol Records (catalog number 324). It reached No. 4 on the Billboard chart. The Desmond recording was made on December 6, 1946, and released by RCA Victor (catalog number 20-2109). It reached No. 12 on the Billboard chart.

A 1931 recording of the song by Al Bowlly was featured on the soundtrack of Jean-Pierre Jeunet's 2001 film, Amélie. Bowlly's recording, which was released by Decca Records, was made on December 2, 1931 with Roy Fox and his Orchestra. Bowlly also recorded the song on several other occasions.

== Other recordings ==
- Steve Conway, released by Columbia in 1947
- The Crests in January, 1962 on Selma records.
- Bing Crosby on November 7, 1931, recorded on radio, for Cremo Cigars
- Ruth Etting on September 1, 1931, originally issued on Columbia 2529-D (Matrix 151761-3). Charted at No. 4.
- Ella Fitzgerald on January 24, 1947, released by US Decca Records (catalog number 23844)
- The Four Freshmen on their 1955 album 4 Freshmen and 5 Trombones
- Billie Holiday on December 27, 1946, for Decca Records.
- Eve Lombard on April 17, 1947, released by UK Decca Records (catalog number F 8773)
- Tony Martin on August 21, 1946, released by Mercury Records (catalog number 3042) with the flip side "Dreamland Rendezvous"
- David Simard and the Da Da's on October 1, 2011
- The Skyrockets Orchestra, Conductor: Paul Fenoulhet Vocal: Doreen Lundy on July 13, 1947, released by EMI on their His Master's Voice label (catalog number BD 5984)
- Mel Tormé and the Mel-Tones on September 10, 1946, released by Musicraft Records (catalog number 428)
- Billy Eckstine on 1961, Broadway, Bongos and Mr. B (studio album. Orch. and arr. by Hal Mooney, Roulette Records)
