= I'm Always Chasing Rainbows =

Vaudeville song composed by Harry Carroll

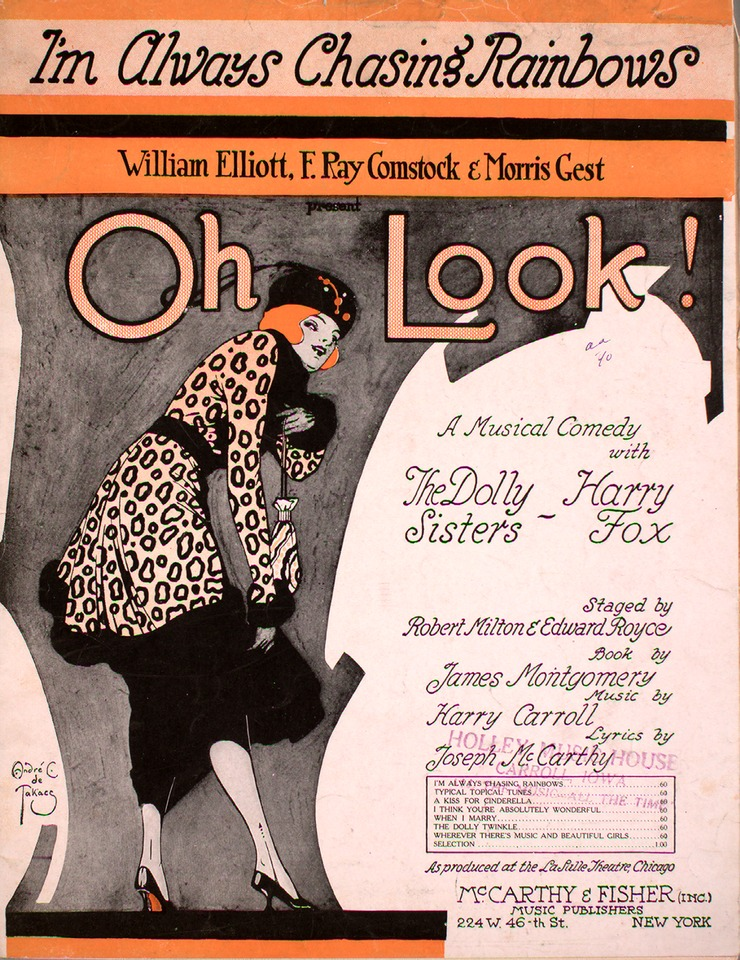
- Sheet music (1918)

Song by the Dolly Sisters
- Published: 1917
- Composer: Harry Carroll
- Lyricist: Joseph McCarthy

Audio sample
- Recording of I'm Always Chasing Rainbows, performed by Harry Fox (1918): file; help

"I'm Always Chasing Rainbows" is a popular vaudeville song. The music was written by Harry Carroll, the melody adapted from Fantaisie-Impromptu by Frédéric Chopin. The lyrics were written by Joseph McCarthy, and the song was published in 1917. It was introduced in the Broadway show Oh, Look! which opened in March 1918. The song was sung in the show by the Dolly Sisters. Judy Garland sang it in the 1941 film Ziegfeld Girl. It was subsequently sung by Jack Oakie in the 1944 film The Merry Monahans and was again featured in the 1945 film The Dolly Sisters (1945), where it was sung by John Payne. It was also included for part of the run (and in the cast album) of the 1973 revival of Irene. In 2019, it was included in the Hazbin Hotel pilot.

== Recorded versions ==
=== Hit versions in 1918 ===
The biggest hit version in 1918 was recorded by Charles W. Harrison on July 26, 1918, and released by Victor Records as catalog number 18496A, with the flip side “I Miss That Mississippi Miss That Misses Me”)

There were also very popular versions recorded by Harry Fox and by Prince's Orchestra (Columbia catalog number A-6064) in the same year.

Harry Fox's version was recorded April 16, 1918, and released by Columbia Records as catalog number A-2557, with the flip side “I Wonder What They're Doing Tonight”)

The Prince's Orchestra (referred to as Prince's Band on) version was recorded July, 1918, and released by Columbia Records as catalog number A-6064, with the flip side “Oh, Frenchy”)

In 1963, the Philadelphia, Pennsylvania R&B group The Tymes recorded a version as the B side to Isle of Love on the Csmeo-Parkway label. It did not chart but it was a favorite in a local Philadelphia area.

=== Hit versions in 1946 ===
The biggest hit versions in the 1946 revival were by Perry Como, by Helen Forrest and Dick Haymes, and by Harry James's Orchestra with a vocal by Buddy DeVito. There was also a recording by Guy Lombardo's Royal Canadians, with a vocal by Erno Rapee, which had a degree of popularity that year.

Perry Como's recording was made October 17, 1945, and released by RCA Victor Records as catalog number 20-1788, with the flip side “You Won't Be Satisfied”. It first reached the Billboard magazine Best Seller chart on January 24, 1946, and lasted 4 weeks on the chart, peaking at #7; it was re-released by RCA Victor as catalog number 20-2663, with the flip side “If We Can't Be the Same Old Sweethearts”

The recording by Helen Forrest and Dick Haymes was made on November 1, 1945, and released by Decca Records as catalog number 23472, with the flip side “Tomorrow Is Forever”. It reached the Billboard magazine Best Seller chart on January 31, 1946, at #10, its only week on the chart.

The recording by Harry James and his orchestra was made on November 7, 1945, released by Columbia Records as catalog number 36899, with the flip side “Baby What You Do to Me” and as catalog number 38434, with the flip side “I'm Beginning to See the Light”

The recording by Guy Lombardo and his Royal Canadians was released by Decca Records as catalog number 3586, with the flip side “Tea for Two” and as catalog number 18789A, with the flip side “Make Believe”)

=== Other recorded versions ===
- Julie Andrews as part of The Julie Andrews Hour, Episode 5, first aired on October 11, 1972
- Ronnie Aldrich
- Tony Bennett
- Alice Cooper – released on his 1976 album Alice Cooper Goes to Hell (Track 10), also featured in 2023 movie Guardians of the Galaxy Vol. 3
- Samuel Ash (released by Medallion Records as catalog number 804, with the flip side “Give Me the Moonlight, Give Me the Girl” and by Emerson Records as catalog number 0930, with the flip side “I'm Sorry I Made You Cry”)
- Polly Bergen
- Beverley Sisters (on the album Those Enchanting...)
- Henry Burr (recorded 1919, released by OKeh Records as catalog number 1136, with the flip side “Those Wonderful Days of Used-to-Be”)
- Diahann Carroll (Performed on an episode of Dynasty).
- Bob Chester and his orchestra (recorded November 26, 1940, released by Bluebird Records as catalog number 10987, with the flip side “Somebody Stole My Gal”)
- Jimmy Clanton (on the LP Jimmy's Happy and the double LP Jimmy's Happy, Jimmy's Blue) 1960.
- Petula Clark (in French, Pourquoi Mon Coeur Tremble)
- Ray Conniff
- Russ Conway on his 1973 album Playing the Great Piano Hits
- Harrison Craig
- Bing Crosby
- Sammy Davis Jr.
- Alice Faye for film Rose of Washington Square (1939), a thinly veiled biography of Fanny Brice
- Ferrante & Teicher
- The Four Freshmen – Voices In Love (1958), Road Show (1960) Road Show is a concert album with the singers backed by Stan Kenton and his band.
- Judy Garland and the David Rose orchestra (released by Decca Records as catalog number 3593B, with the flip side “Our Love Affair”); Garland also performed the song in the film Ziegfeld Girl (1941)
- Jackie Gleason
- Al Goodman and his orchestra (released by Columbia Records as catalog number 36216, with the flip side “The World Is Waiting for the Sunrise”)
- Benny Goodman and his orchestra (recorded December 20, 1940, released by Columbia Records as catalog number 35916, with the flip side “Somebody Stole My Gal”)
- Betty Grable
- Ken Griffin (recorded September 1954, released by Columbia Records as catalog number 40569, with the flip side “Ain't She Sweet”)
- Walter Gross (recorded June 6, 1940, released by Bluebird Records as catalog number 10795, with the flip side “A Slight Case of Ivory”)
- Ted Heath
- Gordon Jenkins (released by Capitol Records as catalog number 106, with the flip side “He Wears a Pair of Silver Wings”, and as catalog numbers 1263 and 15202, both with the flip side “White Christmas”)
- Sumi Jo, for HBO's 2011 miniseries Mildred Pierce.
- Al Jolson
- Hal Kemp's Carolina Club Orchestra (recorded May 24, 1929, released by OKeh Records as catalog number 41409, with the flip side “Allah's Holiday”)
- Andre Kostelanetz
- Liberace
- Hamish Linklater in the 2014 film Magic in the Moonlight
- Elsie Lovelock, in the opening of the Hazbin Hotel pilot, "That's Entertainment" (2019).
- Tony Martin
- Buddy Morrow (recorded January 1946, released by Mercury Records as catalog number 2057, with the flip side “Jalousie”)
- Harry Nilsson
- Jane Olivor on her 1977 album Chasing Rainbows (Columbia Records)
- Mandy Patinkin
- Johnnie Ray
- Della Reese
- Debbie Reynolds
- Buddy Rich – Rags To Riches (1994)
- Voices of Walter Schumann (released by Capitol Records in the United States as catalog number 1752, with the flip side “Far Above Cayuga's Waters” and in the United Kingdom in 1951 as catalog number CL 13638, with the flip side “Moonglow”)
- Frank Sinatra – The Radio Years 1939-1955, Disc 3
- Jo Stafford – Broadway Revisited (2007)
- Barbra Streisand in the 1967 television special, The Belle of 14th Street. Released on her 1991 compilation Just for the Record.
- Take 6 from the soundtrack of the film Glengarry Glen Ross, 1992 Grammy nominee for Best Jazz Vocal Performance
- Jackie Walker (released 1962 by Everest Records as catalog number 20010, with the flip side "Dearly Beloved")
- Barry Wood with Mitchell Miller Orchestra (released by Cosmo Records as catalog number 469, with the flip side “Symphony”)
- Peter Yorke
