= Bud Brisbois =

American trumpeter (1937–1978)

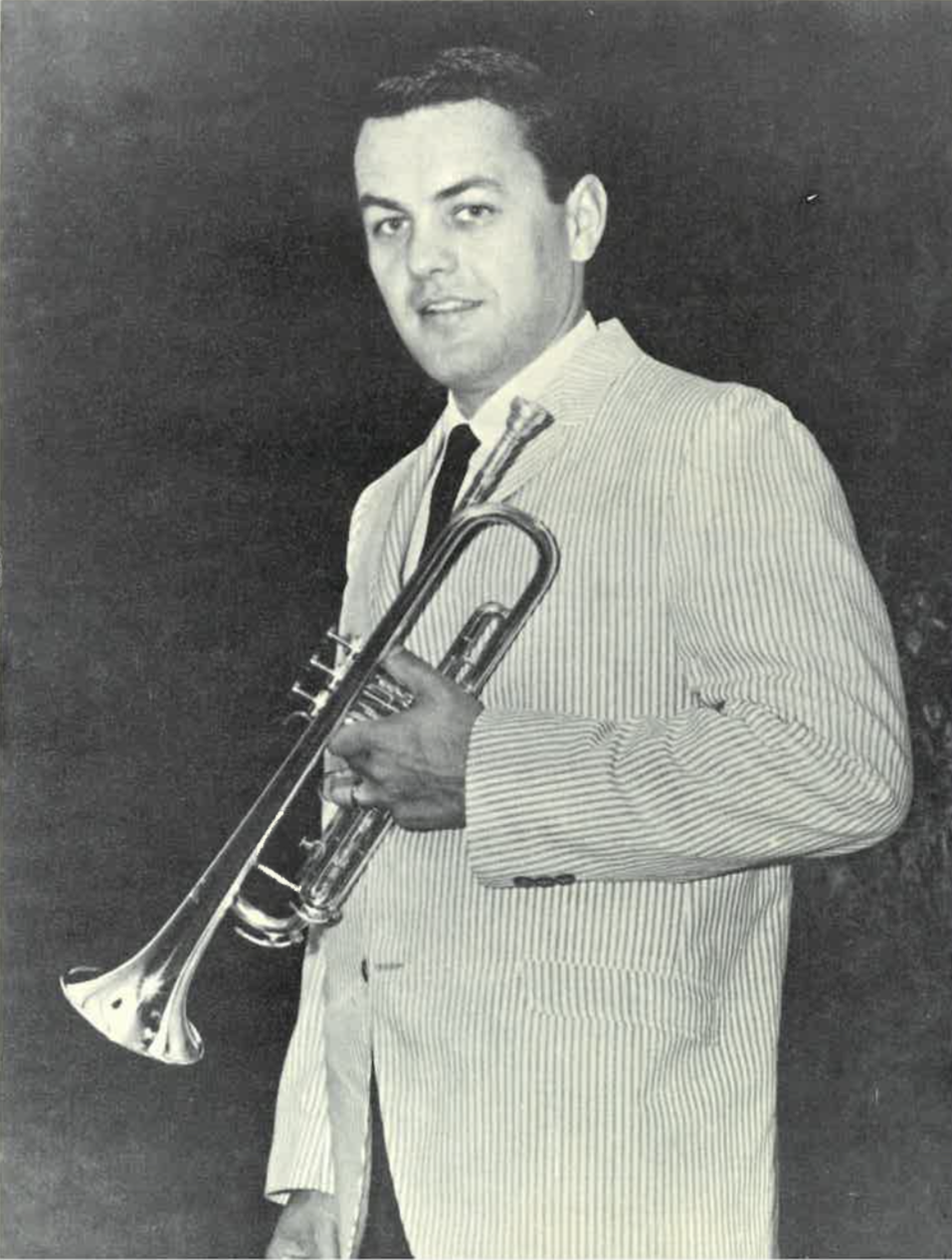
- Brisbois, c. late 1960s

Background information
- Born: Austin Dean Brisbois; April 11, 1937; Edina, Minnesota, U.S.
- Died: June 1, 1978 (aged 41) Scottsdale, Arizona, U.S.
- Genres: Jazz; pop; rock; country; Motown
- Occupation: Musician
- Instrument: Trumpet
- Labels: AnB Records, Award Records
- Formerly of: Stan Kenton, Henry Mancini, Neil Diamond, The Monkees, Frank Sinatra, Billy May, Onzy Matthews

Austin Dean "Bud" Brisbois (April 11, 1937 – June 1, 1978) was an American jazz and studio trumpeter. He played jazz, pop, rock, country, Motown, and classical music.

== Career ==
Brisbois was born in Edina, Minnesota and began studying the trumpet at age 12. He was mainly self-taught, and reportedly had most of his range before leaving high school. He briefly attended University of Minnesota before moving to Los Angeles, where he would live most of his life, when not touring. In September 1958 he joined Stan Kenton's orchestra, where he took over the "scream" parts written for Maynard Ferguson, in addition to playing much of the lead trumpet. Brisbois toured with Kenton's band until the early 60's, recording over 30 albums. Around 1963 he left Kenton to work in the Los Angeles recording studios.

Brisbois worked as a studio musician in Los Angeles from around 1963 to 1975, recording over a hundred albums. He worked with Herb Alpert, Tony Bennett, Chicago Symphony Orchestra, Rosemary Clooney, Nat King Cole, Bobby Darin, Neil Diamond, Duke Ellington, The 5th Dimension, The Four Freshmen, Lionel Hampton, Herbie Hancock, Harry James, Henry Mancini, Dean Martin, Onzy Matthews, Billy May, The Monkees, Bonnie Raitt, Lou Rawls, Lalo Schifrin, Bud Shank, Frank Sinatra, Nancy Sinatra, and Nancy Wilson. He played lead trumpet on the theme songs to Hawaii Five-O and The Jetsons. While in the studio with Hoyt Curtin, Bud played alongside such greats as Lloyd Ullyate (trombone), Tom Johnson (tuba), Pete Jolly (piano), Frankie Capp (drums), Andy Kostelas (piano), Jack Cookerly (electric piano) and Paul Dekorte in the booth as the engineer making sure everything sounded right.

In early 1973 Brisbois formed the rock group Butane, featuring himself as singer and trumpeter. They recorded a demo and played regular gigs over the next two years, performing on the hit television show The Midnight Special airing on 27 July 1973. The group never secured a record contract and eventually disbanded.

In the early 1970s Holton marketed a "Bud Brisbois model" trumpet, the ST-200 (.456-inch bore, thinner one-piece bell).

In 1975, after the breakup of his second marriage, Brisbois had problems with manic depression from which he had suffered all his life. He quit the music business and moved to Beverly Hills, where for a time he worked as a Porsche salesman. In 1976 or 1977, he moved to Scottsdale, Arizona to be near his sister. Eventually he began playing again. When asked what inspired him, he replied, "I was driving down a freeway in LA and heard Claus Ogerman's Gate of Dreams album." Brisbois began teaching privately and worked with Grant Wolf and the Mesa Community College Jazz Band. In addition, he taught the trumpeters of the Musicians Union sponsored Young Sounds band. He performed in bands in Phoenix. In late May or early 1 June 1978, he appeared as a guest with the jazz-rock group "Matrix" and commented, "I played as well as I have ever played." Less than a week later he committed suicide.

== Discography ==
With Willie Hutch

- The Mack (Motown, 1973)
- The Mark of the Beast (Motown, 1974)
- Foxy Brown (Motown, 1974)

With Stan Kenton

- Road Show (Capitol, 1959)
- The Stage Door Swings (Capitol, 1959)
- Viva Kenton! (Capitol, 1960)
- Standards in Silhouette (Capitol, 1960)
- Two Much! (Capitol, 1960)
- Kenton Live from the Las Vegas Tropicana (Capitol, 1961)
- Kenton's West Side Story (Capitol, 1961)
- A Merry Christmas! (Capitol, 1961)
- Sophisticated Approach (Capitol, 1962)
- Artistry in Bossa Nova (Capitol, 1963)
- Kenton / Wagner (Capitol, 1964)
- Stan Kenton Plays for Today (Capitol, 1966)
- Hair (Capitol, 1969)
- Kenton's Christmas (Creative World, 1970)

With Henry Mancini

- Encore! More of the Concert Sound of Henry Mancini (RCA Victor, 1967)
- Mancini '67 (RCA Victor, 1967)
- The Big Latin Band of Henry Mancini (RCA Victor, 1968)
- Mancini Concert (RCA Victor, 1971)
- Music from the TV Series The Mancini Generation (RCA Victor, 1972)
- Symphonic Soul (RCA Victor, 1975)

With The Monkees

- Pisces, Aquarius, Capricorn & Jones Ltd. (Colgems, 1967)
- Instant Replay (Colgems, 1969)
- The Monkees Present (Colgems, 1969)

With others

- The 5th Dimension, Love's Lines, Angles and Rhymes (Bell, 1971)
- The 5th Dimension, Living Together, Growing Together (Bell, 1973)
- Herb Alpert, Casino Royale (Colgems, 1967)
- James Brown, Get On the Good Foot (Polydor, 1993)
- Captain & Tennille, Song of Joy (A&M, 1976)
- Harry Chapin, Portrait Gallery (Elektra, 1975)
- Albert Collins, There's Gotta Be a Change (Tumbleweed, 1971)
- Sonny Criss, Warm & Sonny (ABC Impulse!, 1976)
- Bobby Darin, From Hello Dolly to Goodbye Charlie (Capitol, 1964)
- Neil Diamond, Tap Root Manuscript (UNI, 1970)
- Neil Diamond, Serenade (Columbia, 1974)
- Lamont Dozier, Out Here On My Own (ABC 1973)
- Duke Ellington, The Popular Duke Ellington (RCA Victor, 1966)
- Jerry Fielding, Near East Brass (Command, 1967)
- Clare Fischer, Manteca! (Pacific Jazz, 1965)
- Aretha Franklin, You (Atlantic, 1975)
- The Friends of Distinction, Grazin' (RCA Victor, 1969)
- James William Guercio, Electra Glide in Blue (United Artists, 1973)
- Herbie Hancock, Man-Child (Columbia, 1975)
- Richard Harris, The Yard Went On Forever (Dunhill, 1968)
- The Hues Corporation, Freedom for the Stallion (RCA Victor, 1973)
- Milt Jackson, Memphis Jackson (ABC Impulse!, 1970)
- James Last, Well Kept Secret (Polydor, 1975)
- Love, Forever Changes (Elektra, 1967)
- Gloria Lynne, A Very Gentle Sound (Mercury, 1972)
- Onzy Matthews, Blues with a Touch of Elegance (Capitol, 1964)
- Onzy Matthews, Sounds for the 60's! (Capitol, 1966)
- Maureen McGovern, Academy Award Performance (20th Century, 1975)
- Michael Nesmith, The Wichita Train Whistle Sings (Dot, 1968)
- Pacific Gas & Electric, Pacific Gas and Electric (Columbia, 1969)
- Dory Previn, Mythical Kings and Iguanas (United Artists, 1971)
- Quicksilver Messenger Service, Comin' Thru (Capitol, 1972)
- Bonnie Raitt, Takin' My Time (Warner Bros., 1973)
- Don Randi, 3 in the Cellar (American International) 1970)
- Freddy Robinson, The Coming Atlantis (World Pacific, 1969)
- Pete Rugolo, Ten Trumpets and 2 Guitars (Mercury, 1961)
- Evie Sands, Estate of Mind (Capitol, 1974)
- Lalo Schifrin, Bullitt (soundtrack) (Warner Bros., 1968)
- Lalo Schifrin, Rock Requiem (Verve, 1971)
- Bud Shank, Windmills of Your Mind (World Pacific, 1969)
- Frank Sinatra, My Kind of Broadway (Reprise, 1965)
- Nancy Sinatra, Sugar (Reprise, 1966)
- James Lee Stanley, Three's the Charm (Wooden Nickel, 1974)
- Bob Thiele & Gabor Szabo, Light My Fire (Impulse! 1967)
- Mason Williams, The Mason Williams Ear Show (Warner Bros., 1968)
- Nancy Wilson, Come Get to This (Capitol, 1975)
- Tommy Vig, Encounter with Time (Discovery, 1977)
