= Grammy Award for Best Performance by a Vocal Group =

Music award category

The Grammy Award for Best Performance by a Vocal Group was awarded from 1961 to 1968. In its first year, the award specified that a "vocal group" contains two to six artists. This award was presented alongside the award for Best Performance by a Chorus. Before 1961 these awards were combined into the Grammy Award for Best Performance by a Vocal Group or Chorus.

Although in the "pop" field the award did not specify pop music performances and, in some years, ran alongside the award now presented as the Grammy Award for Best Pop Performance by a Duo or Group with Vocal.

Years reflect the year in which the Grammy Awards were presented, for works released in the previous year.

== Recipients ==
Year^{[I]}	Winner(s)	Work	Nominees	Ref.
1961	Eydie Gormé & Steve Lawrence	We Got Us	"Greenfields" — The Brothers Four; "All over the Place" — The Hi-Los; Here We Go Again! — The Kingston Trio; Scandinavian Shuffle — The Swe-Danes	
1962	Lambert, Hendricks & Ross	High Flying with Lambert, Hendricks & Ross	Voices in Fun — The Four Freshmen; Close Up — The Kingston Trio; "The Way You Look Tonight" — The Lettermen; The Slightly Fabulous Limeliters — The Limeliters	
1963	Peter, Paul and Mary	"If I Had a Hammer (The Hammer Song)"	The Swingers — The Four Freshmen; The Hi-Los Happen to Folk Songs — The Hi-Los; "A Song for Young Love" — The Lettermen; Through Children's Eyes — The Limeliters	
1964	Peter, Paul and Mary	"Blowin' in the Wind"	"Waitin' for the Evening Train" — The Anita Kerr Quartet; Hey, Look Us Over! — The J's with Jamie; Like Sing — Jackie and Ray Kral; The Hi-Los Happen to Bossa Nova — The Hi-Los	
1965	The Beatles	A Hard Day's Night	Grand Ole Opry Favorites — The Browns; The Double Six of Paris Sing Ray Charles — The Double Six of Paris; More Four Freshmen and Five Trombones — The Four Freshmen; In Concert — Peter, Paul & Mary	
1966	Anita Kerr Singers	We Dig Mancini	Help! — Beatles; "Mrs. Brown You've Got a Lovely Daughter" — Herman's Hermits; "Flowers on the Wall" — The Statler Brothers; "You Were on My Mind" — We Five	
1967	Anita Kerr Singers	"A Man and a Woman"	"Cherish" — The Association; "Good Vibrations" — The Beach Boys; "Monday Monday" — The Mamas & The Papas; "Guantanamera" — The Sandpipers	
1968	The 5th Dimension	"Up, Up and Away"	"Windy" — The Association; Sgt. Pepper's Lonely Hearts Club Band — The Beatles; "The Letter" — The Box Tops; "I'm a Believer" — The Monkees	
