= Love Is Just Around the Corner =

"Love Is Just Around the Corner" is a popular song with music by Lewis E. Gensler and lyrics by Leo Robin, published by Famous Music in 1934.

Although it was sung by Bing Crosby in the film Here is My Heart, which was released on December 28, 1934, Cliff Edwards (AKA Ukulele Ike) released a recording on October 19 of that year on the Perfect and Banner labels.

Crosby himself released the song on November 9, 1934, with Georgie Stoll and his Orchestra for Decca Records, which reached No. 8 position in the US charts. He recorded the song again in 1954 for his album Bing: A Musical Autobiography.

The song was also recorded in 1935 by Robert Cummings for the film Millions in the Air, released on December 12 of that year. It became a standard, recorded by other many artists over the decades.

== Other recordings ==
- June Christy - The Uncollected June Christy, Vol II (1957), A Friendly Session, Vol. 2 (1999) with the Johnny Guarnieri Quintet
- Alma Cogan - With Love in Mind (1988)
- Billy Eckstine - Billy Eckstine's Imagination (1958)
- Duke Ellington - Up in Duke's Workshop (1979)
- Jackie Davis - Hammond Gone Cha-Cha (1959):(rereleased on Ultra Lounge/Organs in Orbit) (1996)
- Don Fagerquist - Portrait of a Great Jazz Artist (1957)
- Dave Pell Octet featuring Don Fagerquist - I Had the Craziest Dream (1955)
- Firehouse Five Plus Two - Plays for Lovers (1956)
- The Four Freshmen - 4 Freshmen and 5 Trombones (1955)
- Harry James
  - Harry James and His New Jazz Band, Vol. 2 (Mr. Music MMCD 7012, 1956 [2002])
  - Swingin' N' Sweet (Giants of Jazz Productions GOJ LP-1009, [1978])
- Vic Damone - Vocals by Vic Damone (1952)
- George Shearing - Jazz Masters 57 (1953)
- Paul Anka - Swings for Young Lovers (1960)
- Frank Sinatra - Sinatra and Swingin' Brass (1962)
- Jo Jones - Smiles (1969)
- Michael Holliday - Mike (1962)
- The Platters - Song for the Lonely (1962)
- Mel Tormé- An Evening at Charlie's (1983)
- Kenny Rogers - Timepiece (1994)
- Michael Feinstein - Such Sweet Sorrow (1995)
- Charlie Ventura - Bop for the People (2002)
