= Roger Williams (pianist) =

American pianist (1924–2011)

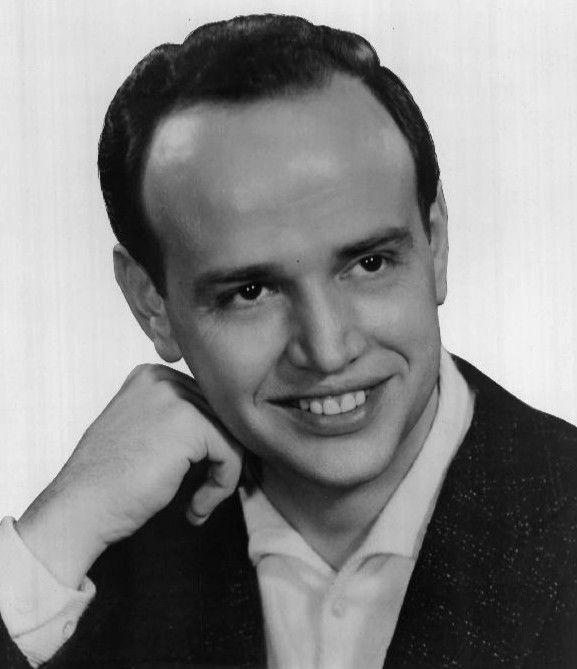
- Williams in 1958

Background information
- Born: Louis Jacob Weertz; October 1, 1924; Omaha, Nebraska, U.S.
- Died: October 8, 2011 (aged 87) Encino, California, U.S.
- Genre: Pop standards
- Instrument: Piano
- Years active: 1955–2011
- Label: Kapp
- Website: www.rogerwilliamsmusic.com

Roger Williams (born Louis Jacob Weertz; October 1, 1924 – October 8, 2011) was an American popular music pianist. Described by the Los Angeles Times as "one of the most popular instrumentalists of the mid-20th century", and "the rare instrumental pop artist to strike a lasting commercial chord," Williams had 22 hit singles – including the chart-topping "Autumn Leaves" in 1955 and "Born Free" in 1966 – and 38 hit albums between 1955 and 1972.

He was a Navy boxing champion, played for nine U.S. Presidential administrations, and had a gold Steinway & Sons grand piano model named in his honor.

== Biography ==
Weertz (pronounced "werts") was born in Omaha, Nebraska, to the Rev. Frederick J. Weertz (1891–1980), a Lutheran minister, and Dorothea Bang Weertz (1895–1985), a violinist and music teacher. The family moved to Des Moines, Iowa, before his first birthday. He first played the piano at age three. In high school he became interested in boxing, mainly at his father's insistence, and returned to music only after breaking his nose several times and sustaining several other injuries. As a young man, Weertz played organ music in his father's St. John's Lutheran Church in Des Moines and piano at the supper club, Babe's Restaurant.

Weertz majored in piano at Drake University in Des Moines, where he began developing a style that was a fusion of jazz, classical, and pop, but was expelled for playing "Smoke Gets in Your Eyes" in the practice room in violation of the school's classical-music-only policy. Weertz entered the United States Navy and served in World War II. While still in the Navy he won the middleweight boxing championship at his base in Idaho and earned a bachelor's degree in engineering from Idaho State College (now Idaho State University) in 1950. Afterward, Weertz re-enrolled at Drake, where he earned his master's degree in music in 1951. He then moved to New York City to attend Juilliard, where he studied jazz piano under Lennie Tristano and Teddy Wilson.

During 1951-1952 Weertz won two talent contests: "Arthur Godfrey's Talent Scouts" and Dennis James' Chance of a Lifetime television program. David Kapp, the founder of Kapp Records, heard him play at the Hotel Madison and was so impressed that he signed the pianist, giving him a professional name "that would stand up anywhere", choosing the name of the founder of Rhode Island.

In 1955 Williams recorded "Autumn Leaves", the only piano instrumental to reach No. 1 on Billboard's popular music chart. It sold over two million copies and was awarded a gold record. In 1966 he had another Top Ten hit with the song "Born Free" from the motion picture soundtrack. His other hits include "Near You", "Till", "The Impossible Dream", "Yellow Bird", "Maria", and "The Theme from Somewhere in Time" which was part of the film's music score. Billboard magazine ranks him as the top-selling piano recording artist in history, with 21 gold and platinum albums to his credit. Williams was known as the "Pianist to the Presidents", having played for nine US Presidential administrations, beginning with Harry S. Truman – who requested Bach and Ravel, then played his own version of the Chopin waltz. His last White House performance was in November 2008 for a luncheon hosted by First Lady Laura Bush.

On his 75th birthday, Williams performed his first 12-hour piano marathon. He performed marathons at the Steinway Hall in New York City, and the Nixon, Carter, and Reagan Presidential Libraries. Williams and Carter were born on the same date and celebrated their mutual 80th birthdays together at the Carter Center when Williams played his marathon there. Williams was a Steinway Artist and was awarded the "Steinway Lifetime Achievement Award." The Steinway & Sons "Roger Williams Limited Edition Gold Piano" was designed to honor the pianist. This grand piano was on tour for public display and entertainment during 2007–2008. In 2010, Williams was inducted into the Hit Parade Hall of Fame.

Williams' music was in movie soundtracks: More Than a Miracle (1967), Somewhere in Time (1980), Untamed Heart ("Nature Boy") (1993), Reckless and ("O Little Town of Bethlehem") (both 1995). He performed his hit song Born Free for the 1967 Oscars "Best Original - Song / Music Score."

Williams developed his caring attitude towards his public from a boyhood experience in Des Moines, Iowa. After a piano concert by Ignacy Jan Paderewski, he waited for 45 minutes outside in cold weather to meet Paderewski. When the pianist finally appeared, it was to rush to a waiting automobile. Williams was upset.

I didn't even get near enough to touch him or get an autograph. It was then and there that I resolved that if ever I became famous I would never disappoint anyone who wanted to talk to me.

Williams claimed to know 10,000 songs by heart and often took requests. Of his talent, he said: “I know I was given a gift, and once in a while I go to church and say, ‘Hey, thanks.’ I play my religion through my fingers.”

== Personal life ==
Williams was married twice. His first marriage produced three children. Both marriages ended in divorce.

In March 2011 Williams posted on his website that he had pancreatic cancer and that his doctors had told him they could not remove the tumor until chemotherapy shrank it to an operable size. He said that he did not plan on canceling any upcoming concerts. He wrote: "What does it all mean? It means I'm in just one more fight – the fight for my life... And this much I know, this old Navy boxing champion is going for broke. Just watch me!" He died on October 8, 2011, one week after his 87th birthday.

== Singles discography ==
Year	Title	Chart positions		
Year	Title	US	CB	US – AC
1955	"Autumn Leaves"	1	1	
1955	"Wanting You"	38	41	
1956	"La Mer (Beyond the Sea)"	37	42	
1956	"Hi-lili Hi-lo"	85	41	
1956	"Tumbling Tumbleweeds"	60	34	
1956	"Two Different Worlds"with Jane Morgan	41	22	
1956	"Anastasia"			
1957	"Almost Paradise"	15	16	
1957	"Moonlight Love"		54	
1957	"Till"	22	24	
1958	"Arrivederci, Roma"	55	32	
1958	"Young Warm and Wonderful"		31	
1958	"Near You"	10	12	
1958	"The World Outside"	71	25	
1959	"Hark! The Herald Angels Sing"			
1959	"Winter Wonderland"			
1959	"Dearer Than Dear"			
1959	"Mockin' Bird Hill"			
1959	"Sunrise Serenade"	106	119	
1960	"La Montana"	98	62	
1960	"Riviera Concerto"			
1960	"Temptation"	56	72	
1961	"Marie, Marie"		108	
1961	"A Lover's Symphony"			
1961	"Yellow Bird"			
1961	"Clair De Lune (Moonlight Love)"			
1961	"Maria"	48	40	11
1961	"Santa Claus-Santa Claus"			
1962	"Intermezzo"			
1962	"Amor"	88	89	16
1962	"On Top of Old Smokey" (with The Lincolns and Rich Dehr)			
1962	"Niagara Theme"			
1962	"Theme From 'Mutiny on the Bounty'"			
1963	"Cold, Cold Heart"			
1963	"Theme From 'Ben Casey'"			
1963	"On the Trail"	113	140	
1963	"Janie Is Her Name"		118	
1963	"Look Again"		127	
1963	"Theme from 'The Cardinal'"	109	120	
1964	"Felicia"			
1964	"This Is My Prayer"			
1964	"Whistl'n"		140	
1965	"Vaya con Dios"			
1965	"High Noon"			
1965	"Try to Remember"	97	97	
1965	"Summer Wind"	109	97	20
1965	"Autumn Leaves '65"	92	110	10
1966	"Lara's Theme"	65	90	5
1966	"Born Free"	7	7	1
1967	"Sunrise, Sunset"	84	65	5
1967	"Love Me Forever"	60	63	3
1967	"More Than a Miracle"	108	100	2
1968	"The Spinning Song"			
1968	"The Impossible Dream"	55	52	5
1968	"If You Go"			37
1968	"Only for Lovers"	119	123	31
1969	"Love Theme From 'La Strada'"		122	
1969	"White Christmas"			
1969	"Galveston"	99	99	21
1969	"Fill the World with Love"			
1970	"Song From 'M*A*S*H' (Suicide Is Painless)"			
1970	"Butterflies" (By Laura and Roger Williams)			
1970	"Ain't No Mountain High Enough"			
1971	"Theme From 'Love Story'"			
1971	"Theme from Summer of '42 (The Summer Knows)"		118	
1971	"How Can You Mend a Broken Heart"			
1972	"Lady Sings The Blues"			
1972	"Love Theme From 'The Godfather'"	116	115	
1974	"Theme From 'Murder on the Orient Express'"			
1975	"Theme From 'Rollerball'"			
1976	"Cast Your Fate to the Wind"			39
1977	"Main Theme from King Kong"			32
1977	"Theme From 'Airport 77'"			
1980	"Somewhere in Time"			

== Discography ==
- The Boy Next Door (Kapp KL-1003) – 1957
- It's a Big Wide Wonderful World (Kapp KL-1008) – 1958
- Roger Williams with Orchestra (Kapp KL-1012) – 1955
- Daydreams (Kapp KL-1031) – 1955
- Roger Williams Plays the Wonderful Music of the Masters (Kapp KL-1040) – 1956
- Roger Williams Plays Christmas Songs (Kapp KL-1042) – 1956
- Roger Williams Plays Beautiful Waltzes (Kapp KL-1062, KS-3000) – 1957
- Almost Paradise (Kapp KL-1063) – 1957
- Songs of the Fabulous Fifties (Kapp KXL-5000) (2-record set) – 1957
- Songs of the Fabulous Forties (Kapp KXL-5003) (2-record set) – 1957
- Songs of the Fabulous Century (Kapp KXL-5005) (2-record set) – 1958
- Till (Kapp KL-1081) – 1958
- Roger Williams Plays Gershwin (Kapp KL-1088) – 1958
- Near You (Kapp KL-1112) – 1959
- More Songs of the Fabulous Fifties (Kapp KL-1130, KS-3013) – 1959
- With These Hands (Kapp KL-1147, KS-3030) – 1959
- Christmas Time (Kapp KL-1164, KS-3048, MCA-536, MCA-15005) – 1959
- Always – Melodies That Will Live Forever (Kapp KL-1172, KS-3056) – 1960
- Songs of the Fabulous Forties – Part 1 (Kapp KL-1207, KS-3207) – 1960
- Songs of the Fabulous Forties – Part 2 (Kapp KL-1208, KS-3208) – 1960
- Songs of the Fabulous Fifties – Part 1 (Kapp KL-1209, KS-3209) – 1960
- Songs of the Fabulous Fifties – Part 2 (Kapp KL-1210, KS-3210) – 1960
- Songs of the Fabulous Century – Part 1 (Kapp KL-1211, KS-3211) – 1960
- Songs of the Fabulous Century – Part 2 (Kapp KL-1212, KS-3212) – 1960
- Temptation (Kapp KL-1217, KS-3217) – 1960
- Roger Williams Invites You to Dance (Kapp KL-1222, KS-3222) – 1961
- Yellow Bird (Kapp KL-1244, KS-3244) – 1961
- Songs of the Soaring '60s – Vol. 1 (Kapp KL-1251, KS-3251) – 1961
- Roger Williams at Town Hall (Kapp KXL-5008) (2-record set) – 1961
- Greatest Hits (Kapp KL-1260, KS-3260) – 1962
- Maria (Kapp KL-1266, KS-3266) – 1962
- Mr. Piano (Kapp KL-1290, KS-3290) – 1962
- Country Style (Kapp KL-1305) – 1963
- For You (Kapp KL-1336, KS-3336) – 1963
- The Solid Gold Steinway (Kapp KL-1354, KS-3354) – 1964
- By Special Request (Kapp KL-3. KS-3) – 1964
- Roger Williams Family Album of Hymns (Kapp KS-3395)
- Academy Award Winners (Kapp KL-1406, KL-3406) – 1964
- Roger Williams Plays the Hits (Kapp KL-1414, KS-3414) – 1965
- Summer Wind and Your Special Requests (Kapp KL-1434, KS-3434) – 1965
- Autumn Leaves – 1965 (Kapp KL-1452, KS-3452) – 1965
- I'll Remember You (Kapp KL-1470, KS-3470) – 1967
- Somewhere My Love (Kapp KS-3470) – 1967
- Academy Award Winners – Vol. 2 (Kapp KL-1483)
- Born Free (Kapp KL-1501, KS-3501, KTL-3501) – 1966
- Roger! (Kapp KL-1512, KS-3512) – 1967
- Golden Hits (Kapp KL-1530, KS-3530) – 1967
- By Special Request – Vol. 2 (Kapp KL-4, KS-4) – 1967
- Amor (Kapp KS-3549) – 1968
- The Impossible Dream (Kapp KS-3550) – 1968
- More Than a Miracle (Kapp KS-3550)
- Only for Lovers (Kapp KS-3565) – 1968
- Happy Heart (Kapp KS-3595) – 1969
- The Piano Magic of Roger Williams (Columbia Musical Treasuries P2S-5306, P3S-5314) – 1969
- Roger Williams Plays Love Theme from Romeo & Juliet and Other Great Movie Themes (Kapp KS-3610, L3610)
- Themes from Great Movies (Kapp KS-3629) – 1970
- Golden Hits – Vol. 2 (Kapp KS-3638) – 1970
- Magic Moods – Roger Williams/Bert Kaempfert (MCA Special Markets DL-734729) – 1970
- Love Story (Kapp KS-3645) – 1971
- Summer of '42 (The Summer Knows) (Kapp KS-3650) – 1971
- Twilight Themes: 10 All-Time Favorites (Longines Symphonette Society – SYS5329, LS206C, LWS 640) – 1971
- Love Theme from "The Godfather" (Kapp KS-3665) – 1972
- Play Me: Love Themes from "Lady Sings the Blues" (Kapp KS-3671) – 1972
- The Roger Williams Showcase (Kapp KW-900)
- Roger Williams (MCA-324) – 1973
- Roger Williams Live (MCA-378) – 1973
- The Way We Were (MCA-403) – 1974
- I Honestly Love You (MCA-438) – 1975
- Virtuoso (MCA-2175) – 1976
- Nadia's Theme (MCA-2237) – 1976
- The Best of Roger Williams (MCA2-4106, RCA Music Service R-243835) (2-record set) – 1976
- Evergreen (MCA-2279) – 1977
- Autumn Leaves: The Best of Roger Williams (Reader's Digest RDA-187) (8-record set) – 1979
- Golden Christmas (Holiday HDY-1927) – 1981
- Ivory Impact (Bainbridge BT-8002) – 1982
- 1970's (MCA2-4180) – 1983
- The Best of the Beautiful (MCAD-5571) – 1985
- To Amadeus with Love (MCAD-5574) – 1985
- Somewhere in Time (Bainbridge BT-6265) – 1986
- Today, My Way (Priority (Capitol) Records SL9323) – 1986
- The Great Love Songs (MCA Special Products 15074) (3-CD set) – 1993
- Golden Christmas (Special Music Company SCD-4607) – 1993
- Sunrise Sunset (MCA, Pickwick SPC-3511)
- Spanish Eyes (MCA, Pickwick SPC-3367)
- Roger Williams & Ferrante and Teicher (Metro M-484)
- Born Free ... and Other Great Romantic Melodies (Longines Symphonette Society LS 206-A) (5-record box set)
