= Viva Kenton! =

Studio album by Stan Kenton
- Released: 1960
- Recorded: September 22–23, 1959
- Studio: Riverside Plaza Hotel, New York City
- Genre: Jazz
- Label: Capitol T/ST 1305
- Producer: Lee Gillette

Stan Kenton chronology
Standards in Silhouette (1959)	Viva Kenton! (1960)	Road Show (1959)

Viva Kenton! (subtitled Exciting Latin Rhythms with the Kenton Touch) is an album by Stan Kenton, released in 1959 by Capitol Records, and later on Kenton's own Creative World label.

The album features compositions by Gene Roland, and was Kenton's second all-Latin album. It was the follow-up to Kenton's successful Cuban Fire! LP of 1956.

Viva Kenton! features Kenton's 18-piece orchestra, with an additional percussion quartet. Featured soloists are alto saxophonist Charlie Mariano, trombonist Don Sebesky, and trumpeter Rolf Ericson.

In 2005, Blue Note released the album on CD (under the Capitol Jazz imprint) with 6 bonus tracks, all taken from the 1963 album Artistry in Bossa Nova.

== Reception ==
Professional ratings
Review scores
Source	Rating
Allmusic	4/5 stars
The Penguin Guide to Jazz Recordings	3/4 stars

The Allmusic review by Scott Yanow called the album "potentially gimmicky but surprisingly successful".

== Track listing ==
All compositions by Gene Roland except where noted.

1. "Mexican Jumping Bean" – 4:30
2. "Siesta" – 3:37
3. "Cha Cha Sombrero" – 4:48
4. "Chocolate Caliente" – 3:26
5. "Aqua Marine" – 2:41
6. "Opus in Chartreuse Cha-Cha-Cha" – 2:48
7. "Cha Cha Chee Boom" – 3:50
8. "Adios" (Enric Madriguera) – 3:09
9. "Mission Trail" – 3:23
10. "Artistry in Rhythm" (Stan Kenton) – 3:01
- Recorded at the Riverside Plaza Hotel, NYC on September 22, 1959 (track 10) and September 23, 1959 (tracks 1–9)

== Personnel ==
- Stan Kenton – piano, conductor
- Bud Brisbois, Bill Chase, Rolf Ericson, Roger Middleton, Dalton Smith – trumpet
- Kent Larsen, Archie Le Coque, Don Sebesky – trombone
- Jim Amlotte, Bob Knight – bass trombone
- Charlie Mariano – alto saxophone
- John Bonnie, Bill Trujillo – tenor saxophone
- Marvin Holladay, Jack Nimitz – baritone saxophone
- Pete Chivily – bass
- Jimmy Campbell – drums
- Mike Pacheco – bongos, timbales
- Willie Rodriguez – congas, bongos
- Tommy Lopez – congas (tracks 1–9)
