= Standards in Silhouette =

Studio album by Stan Kenton
- Released: LP 1959; CD 1998
- Recorded: September 21–22, 1959
- Venue: Riverside Plaza Hotel, New York City
- Genre: Jazz, big band, instrumental, popular standards
- Length: 45:18
- Label: Capitol
- Producer: Lee Gillette

Stan Kenton chronology
Kenton Live from the Las Vegas Tropicana (1959)	Standards in Silhouette (1959)	Viva Kenton! (1959)
- LP Capitol; ST-1394; CD re-issue Capitol Jazz CDP 94503 2

Standards in Silhouette is an album recorded in September 1959 by Stan Kenton and his orchestra. The entire set of arrangements for the LP were written by Bill Mathieu. This recording stands alone in approach and style; Kenton himself only plays on "Django" (no piano called for by Mathieu on all others) and every standard is done at a slow, ballad tempo with very sparse, effusive writing.

== Background ==
Only a year before the Kenton recording dates for Standards In Silhoutte, the Ballad Style of Stan Kenton had been released with all charts being penned by Kenton himself. Though Standards In Silhoutte and Ballad Style of Stan Kenton both feature standards at slow tempos, the comparisons abruptly stop there. The earlier record is known as "Kenton Plays Pretty" giving Kenton another commercial success while Standards In Silhoutte is dark, moody and experimental; moving 180 degrees away from the tried and tested ballads from the dance book.

=== Bill Mathieu, Stan Kenton and Standards in Silhouette ===
Merely 22 years old at the time, Bill Mathieu had submitted his first score to Kenton just six years before. He was then used as a trumpet player in the section for a short period and then moved into an arranging slot of the band. In sharp contrast to earlier arrangers for the group such as Bill Holman, Lennie Niehaus, and Gene Roland, Mathieu's music was not of the rhythmic, swinging variety. Kenton made a bold move and allowed the young arranger the full responsibility to produce an artistically and commercially viable set of arrangements for the band; for an entire ballad album. This was a savvy move and Kenton recognized Mathieu had full command "of an art aspired to by many writers, but rarely accomplished with the flair and ingenuity Mathieu achieves."

Before The Thrill Is Gone score was seen by Kenton while the band was in San Francisco, none of Mathieu's charts had yet caught the imagination of the band leader. "That is a beautiful thing" Kenton said, "What's next?" Kenton approached Mathieu about more music and meanwhile Mathieu had come up with the album title of Standards In Silhouette. After trying to augment the first chart with contrasting music (more up tempo and rhythmic) Kenton said, "Bill, let's not worry about that, let's make it entirely a mood album." Kenton's intuition as a band leader and artist was spot on and Mathieu was to come up with nine ballads on standards that have become legendary for composers and arrangers to study.

=== The recording of Standards in Silhouette ===
It was the end of an era for this incarnation of Kenton orchestras. September 21–23 of 1959 were the very last recording sessions the band would do, the next studio time completed in Hollywood would be utilized by what would come to be known as the first Kenton mellophonium bands. The three days are for the recording of not just "Standards in Silhoutte" but also "Viva Kenton". Many bands have been called a leader's "best," this last Kenton incarnation of the 1950s bands may very well be the best. It is hard to fathom within three days of a jammed packed recording schedule a group could pull off one of Kenton's most subtle and introspective recordings and then a commercial 'cha cha' album in the opposite direction in terms of style and approach. As trombonist Archie LeCoque recalled, "...it was hard, but at the time we were all young and straight-ahead, we got through it and both albums came out well."

By 1959 Stereophonic sound recording was now being fully utilized with all major labels. One of the great triumphs of the Standards in Silhouette album is the combination of the room used, the music, a live group with very few overdubs, and the recording being in full stereo fidelity (and later remastered to digital). Bill Mathieu was highly skeptical of the decision to record his music in a cavernous ballroom like Cuban Fire! and The Stage Door Swings had been done just a few years before. Mathieu adds, "Stan and producer Lee Gillette were absolutely right: the band sounds alive and awake (which is not easy when recording many hours of slow-tempo music in a studio), and most importantly, the players could hear themselves well in the live room. The end result is the band sounds strong and cohesive, and the album is well recorded."

=== Soloists on Standards in Silhouette ===
On Standards in Silhouette the soloists are the final touch that complete the picture. The set of solos by just Charlie Mariano alone are each masterpieces that foreshadow the future soulful playing later on from alto players such as David Sanborn and Dick Oatts. It is one of Mariano's most influential set of tracks, though only delivered as a sideman. Ironically, Mariano was later critical of playing with the Kenton orchestra and would avoid playing within a big band format during the rest of his playing career. Mathieu is very generous with his praise in this respect for the band, "...and I was especially happy with the soloists, Roger, Rolf and most especially Archie. As far as Charlie, his playing, especially on 'Django,' provided the spark and authenticity the album needed."

The influence of Gil Evans writing during that period and Mathieu's admiration for Gil's writing is acknowledged. The comparison fits well but Mathieu's scores do not sound like cheap knock-offs of Evans'; his work on "Standards In Silhouette" is able to stand firmly upright on its own. Ironically, the one score which does not make the original LP is "Lazy Afternoon" (included on CD). This arrangement is directly comparable to the style and mood to Evans' originals "La Nevada" or "Balboa Song". At 3:26 in length, "Lazy Afternoon" is far shorter than anything else recorded.

== Reception ==
Professional ratings
Review scores
Source	Rating
Down Beat	4/4 stars
The Jazz Review	very positive
Penguin Guide to Jazz	3.5/4 stars
All About Jazz	very positive

Reviews

...Standards in Silhouette is one of Kenton's finest albums of ballads, and is unusual in that it features exclusively the arrangements of the then 22-year-old Bill Mathieu. The selection of tunes is outstanding. From well known standards like "Willow Weep for Me" (also recorded previously by Kenton with a vocal by June Christy), Harold Arlen's "Slow Wind" and Hoagy Carmichael's "I Get Along Without You Very Well" to numbers you would not expect to hear a Kenton band performing like John Lewis' "Django," this album is an aural delight for Kenton cognoscenti and newcomers alike.

WILLIAM GRIM, All About Jazz.com

== Track listing ==
- All arrangements written by Bill Mathieu

No.	Title	Writer(s)	Length
1.	"Willow Weep for Me"	Ann Ronell	5:52
2.	"The Thrill Is Gone"	Lew Brown, Ray Henderson	4:55
3.	"The Meaning of the Blues"	Bobby Troup, Leah Worth	5:27
4.	"When Sunny Gets Blue"	Jack Segal, Marvin Fisher	4:48
5.	"Ill Wind"	Harold Arlen, Ted Koehler	5:27
6.	"Django"	John Lewis	5:04
7.	"I Get Along Without You Very Well"	Hoagy Carmichael	5:05
8.	"Lonely Woman"	Benny Carter, Ray Sonin	5:34
9.	"Lazy Afternoon"	John Treville Latouche, Jerome Moross	3:27
Total length:			45:18

- Tracks 1–8 comprised the original LP

== Recording sessions ==
- September 21–22, 1959 at the Riverside Plaza Hotel, New York City

== Personnel ==
=== Musicians ===
- Conductor – Stan Kenton (piano on "Django" only)
- Arranger – Bill Mathieu
- Alto saxophone – Charlie Mariano
- Tenor saxophone – Bill Trujillo, John Bonnie
- Baritone saxophone – Jack Nimitz, Marvin Holladay
- Trumpet – Bud Brisbois, Clyde Reasinger (tracks #3,8), Bill Chase, Rolf Ericson, Roger Middleton, Dalton Smith (all track except #3,8)
- Trombone – Archie LeCoque, Don Sebesky, Kent Larson
- Bass Trombone – Jim Amlotte, Bob Knight
- Bass – Pete Chivily
- Drums – Jimmy Campbell
- Bongos – Mike Pacheco ("Lazy Afternoon" only)

=== Production ===
- Producer (LP): Lee Gillette
- Recording (CD): Michael Cuscuna
- Remixing and remastering (CD): Ron McMaster
- Liner notes: Michael Sparke (CD)
