= Jackie Walker (singer) =

American singer (born 1939)

Jackie Walker (born 1939) was an American popular music tenor singer of the late 1950s and early 1960s on Imperial Records. He also recorded as tenor of The Baysiders, a three-man, one woman vocal group that had been students together at UCLA.

== Discography ==
Singles

- Love Sublime / On The Way Home, Dot 45-15552 - Feb 10, 1957
- Wonderful One / Peggy Sue, Imperial X5473 - Feb 1958
- Oh Lonesome Me / Only Teenagers Allowed, Imperial X5490 - 1958
- Eternally (Wanting You, Needing You) / Good, Good Feelin´, Imperial X5521 - May 1958
- Heart Breakin' News / Take A Dream, Everest 1962
- I'm Always Chasing Rainbows - backed by The Baysiders, Everest 1962
- Dearly Beloved
