= Harry Akst =

American songwriter (1894–1963)

- Born: August 15, 1894; New York City, New York, United States
- Died: March 31, 1963 (aged 68) Hollywood, California, United States
- Occupation: Songwriter
- Instrument: Piano
- Formerly of: Irving Berlin, Sam M. Lewis, Joe Young

Harry Akst (August 15, 1894 – March 31, 1963) was an American songwriter, who started out his career as a pianist in vaudeville accompanying singers such as Nora Bayes, Frank Fay and Al Jolson.

== Life and career ==
Akst was born in New York, United States.

For four years, he worked for Bayes. Then in 1916, he enlisted in the army and was at Camp Upton when he met Irving Berlin (in 1921 they would write "Home Again Blues"). His most notable success came with the song he wrote in 1925 with Sam M. Lewis and Joe Young: "Dinah". It would go on to multiple hit recordings by Bing Crosby, The Boswell Sisters, Ethel Waters, Fats Waller, Louis Armstrong, The Mills Brothers, Sam Donahue, and Ted Lewis.

His movie scores include Bulldog Drummond, The Squall, This Is Heaven, On with the Show, Broadway Babies, The Mississippi Gambler, No, No, Nanette, Song of the West, Song of the Flame, Leathernecking, Palmy Days, The Kid from Spain, Dinah, Professional Sweetheart, Glamour, Stand Up and Cheer!, Change of Heart, The Silver Streak, Paddy O'Day, Star for a Night, Fight for Your Lady, Up the River, Battle of Broadway, Island in the Sky, Harvest Melody, Rosie the Riveter and This Time for Keeps.

Akst worked on the Broadway production of Artists and Models (1927), eventually moving to Hollywood to continue songwriting for Broadway musicals. He appeared as the rehearsal pianist, show pit orchestra conductor, and concertmaster "Jerry" in 42nd Street (1933). Some of the same footage was used in Gold Diggers of 1937 (1936)--Akst can be seen conducting the pit orchestra during the overture which preceded the final production number (All's Fair in Love and War).

Harry Akst died in Hollywood, California, on March 31, 1963, at the age of 68, and was laid to rest in Forest Lawn Memorial Park (Hollywood Hills).

He was inducted in the Songwriters Hall of Fame in 1983.

== Selected songs ==
- "Home Again Blues" (1921), with Irving Berlin
- "Stella" (1923), with Al Jolson (1942 version by Del Porter with Spike Jones & His City Slickers)
- "A Smile Will Go A Long Way" (1923), with Benny Davis
- "Dinah" (1925), with Sam M. Lewis and Joe Young
- "Baby Face" (1926), with Benny Davis
- "Dearest (You're The Nearest To My Heart)", with Benny Davis
- "(I Says To Myself Says I) There's The One For Me" (1929), with Jack Yellen (From Bulldog Drummond)
- "My Strongest Weakness is You" (1929), with Sidney Clare (From So Long Letty)
- "Am I Blue?" (1929), with Grant Clarke (From "On with the Show!")
- "Don't it Mean a Thing to You?" (1929), with Grant Clarke (From On with the Show!)
- "Birmingham Bertha" (1929), with Grant Clarke (From "On with the Show!")
- "In the Land of Let's Pretend" (1929), with Grant Clarke (From "On with the Show!")
- "Let Me Have My Dreams" (1929), with Grant Clarke (From "On with the Show!")
- "As Long As I'm With You" (1930), with Grant Clarke (From No, No, Nanette)
- "There's Nothing Too Good For My Baby" (1931), Eddie Cantor and Benny Davis (From Palmy Days)
- "Guilty" (1931) with Gus Kahn and Richard A. Whiting.
- "I'd Rather Be With You" (1935), with Elsa Maxwell and Lew Brown (from Casino de Paree)
- "This Is Love" (1935), with lyrics by Lew Brown (in film Her First Beau)
- "Everybody Swing" (1936), with Sidney Clare
- "Don't Throw Kisses" (1937), with Sidney Clare (For Big Town Girl)
- "Blue is the Evening" (1938) with Sidney Clare (For Rascals)
- "The Egg and I" (1947) music by Harry Ruby, lyrics by Bert Kalmar, Al Jolson, and Harry Akst
- "No Sad Songs For Me" (1950), with Al Jolson

== Original works for Broadway ==
- Artists and Models of 1927 (1927) - revue, co-composed with Maurie Rubens, lyrics by J. Keirn Brennan, Benny Davis, Ted Lewis, and Jack Osterman
- Calling All Stars (1934) - revue, lyrics by Lew Brown

== Other Broadway credits ==
- Ladies First (1918), musical, Music by A. Baldwin Sloane, Book by Harry B. Smith, Lyrics by Harry B. Smith with additional music by Nora Bayes, Seymour Simons, George Gershwin, Harry Clarke and Akst with additional lyrics by Irving Fisher, Simons, Ira Gershwin, Schuyler Greene, and Harry Clarke, also featuring songs by James Brockmann and James Kendl.
- Ziegfeld Midnight Frolic (1920), revue, Book by Ballard MacDonald, Music by Harry Carroll, with additional music by Max Hoffmann, Irving Berlin, Akst, and Dave Stamper.
- Music Box Revue (1921), revue, Musical Supervisor/Under the Personal Direction of
- Swingin' The Dream (1939), musical/variety, song "Dinah"
- At Home With Ethel Waters (1953), revue, songs "Am I Blue?" and "Dinah"
- John Murray Anderson's Almanac (1953), revue, featuring songs by Harry Akst - Additional
- Mr. Wonderful (1956),
