= W. A. Mathieu =

American composer, pianist and author

William Allaudin Mathieu (born 1937) is a composer, pianist, choir director, music teacher, and author. He began studying piano at the age of six, and began recording his music and compositions in the 1970s on his record label, Cold Mountain Music. Mathieu has composed and recorded solo piano works, chamber pieces, choral music, and song cycles, and he has written four books on music, music theory, and how to live a musical life.

== Career ==
Mathieu studied jazz composition with William Russo from 1954 to 1958; Eurocentric music with Easley Blackwood from 1963 to 1967; Middle Eastern music with Nubian master musician Hamza El Din from 1971 to 2004, with whom he also collaborated; and raga with North Indian vocalist Pandit Pran Nath from 1973 to 1996. Mathieu's recordings reflect the integration of these and many other influences.

In the late 1950s and early 1960s (as Bill Mathieu), he spent several years as an arranger and composer for Stan Kenton and Duke Ellington orchestras. Kenton's album Standards in Silhouette consists entirely of Mathieu's arrangements and revealed the young Mathieu (then 22 years of age) to be an adept manipulator of compositional materials.

He was one of the founders and the musical director for The Second City in Chicago, the first ongoing improvisational theater troupe in the United States, and was later the musical director for The Committee, an improv theater in San Francisco that was an offshoot of The Second City. In the 1970s, he was on the faculties of San Francisco Conservatory of Music and Mills College. In 1969, Mathieu founded the Sufi Choir in San Francisco among followers of Samuel L. Lewis, and he directed the choir until 1982.

Mathieu enjoys sharing his tuning expertise with others, including beginners — and especially those who are convinced they are tone-deaf. “Nobody is tone-deaf,” he claims. He has regularly trained his “Tone-Deaf Choirs” to sing in tune, often in public.

He now devotes himself to practice, performance, recording, composition, teaching, and writing from his home near Sebastopol, California.

== Early life ==
Mathieu was born in Cincinnati, Ohio. His father was Aron M. Mathieu (1907–1996), publisher and founder of Minicam (later retitled Modern Photography) in 1937, editor at Writer's Digest for three decades, and founder of the Writer's Market franchise. His mother was Rosella Feher Mathieu (1906–2008), noted authority on herbs, and author of Herb Grower's Complete Guide (1950), one of the first books in the United States on growing and cooking with herbs.

In Cincinnati, Mathieu attended Kennedy-Silverton Elementary School (1942–1949) and Walnut Hills High School (1949–1954). In Chicago, he attended University of Chicago (1954–1958), earning a BA degree.

== Discography ==
=== Solo piano improvisations ===
- Transparencies (Cold Mountain Music, 2019)
- Songs of Samsara (Cold Mountain Music, 2009)
- Narratives (Cold Mountain Music, 2002)

=== Multitrack compositions ===
- Streaming Wisdom/In the Wind (Cold Mountain Music, compilation; remastered 2004)
- Second Nature (Cold Mountain Music, 1983; remastered 2004)
- In the Wind (Cold Mountain Music, 1983)
- Streaming Wisdom (Cold Mountain Music, 1981)

=== Piano compositions ===
- Magic Clavier Book II – Seven Etudes in Modulating Modality Noam Lemish, piano (Cold Mountain Music, 2018)
- Magic Clavier Book I – Twelve Etudes in Extended Modality Noam Lemish, piano, and Seven Solo and Duo Improvisations Noam Lemish and W. A. Mathieu, piano (Cold Mountain Music, 2015)
- 5:4 – Compositions for Piano, Marilyn Morales, piano solo, "The Poet Variations" on a theme by Robert Schumann; Kirk Whipple & Marilyn Morales, piano duo, "Five Poems / Four Hands"; W. A. Mathieu & Kirk Whipple, piano duo, "Four Improvisations / Twenty Fingers" (Cold Mountain Music, 2015)
- Three Compositions for Piano (Cold Mountain Music, 2002)
- Lakes & Streams (The Relaxation Company – CD587, 1993)
- Piano Celebration (Vital Body 6509, 1992)
- Available Light (Windham Hill, 1987)
- Listening to Evening (Sona Gaia, 1985)

=== Instrumental compositions ===
- Second String Quartet, Telegraph Quartet (Cold Mountain Music, 2022)
- First String Quartet, The Galax Quartet (Cold Mountain Music, 2016)
- Compositions for Guitar, Mobius Trio, with Justin Houchin "Six Ellipses for Four Guitars", and "Lattice Work (Lattice-Işi)", Tolgahan Çoğulu, microtonal guitar) (Cold Mountain Music, 2016)

=== Song cycles ===
- Café Hafiz – Twenty-One Songs for Your Serious Entertainment, with Devi Mathieu, soprano (Cold Mountain Music, 2014)
- Antiphons Across Time / Flower of the Maiden – The Music of Hildegard von Bingen, with Trio Ephemeros (Devi Mathieu, W. A. Mathieu, Shira Kammen) (Cold Mountain Music, 2013)
- For All ~ six tracks on On Cold Mountain: Songs on Poems of Gary Snyder, with Karen Clark, contralto + Galax Quartet (Innova Recordings, 2011)
- The Indian Parrot (Mutable Music, 2006)
- If the Sun Could Sing, with Trio Ephemeros (Devi Mathieu, W. A. Mathieu, Shira Kammen) (unpublished, 2006)
- Rumi and Strings (Cold Mountain Music, 2005)
- Say I Am You - Four Song Cycles from the Poetry of Jelaluddin Rumi (Cold Mountain Music, 2003)

=== Improvisational collaborations ===
- Full Bloom – Trios for Piano and Percussion, with George Marsh and Jennifer Wilsey (Cold Mountain Music, 2014)
- The Bloom – Trios for Piano and Percussion, with George Marsh and Jennifer Wilsey (Cold Mountain Music, 2011)
- Centerpeace, 2010 collaboration with Andrew York
- The Ghost Opera (Cold Mountain Music, 2006), with the Ghost Opera Company formed at the San Francisco Conservatory of Music
- Game/No Game with George Marsh (Mutable Music, 2004)
- This Marriage (Cold Mountain Music, 2002)

=== Collaborations ===
- On Cold Mountain: Songs on Poems of Gary Snyder, Karen Clark, contralto + Galax Quartet (composers Fred Frith, W. A. Mathieu, Robert Morris, Roy Whelden) (Innova Recordings, 2011)

=== Big Band jazz ===
- With Stan Kenton: Standards In Silhouette, (Capitol Records #1394, 1960)
- With Duke Ellington: Piano in the Background, (Columbia Records, 1960)
- Double Feature - Volume 2: The Stan Kenton Orchestra and The Nova Jazz Orchestra, (Tantara Productions, 2011)
- Concerto Nova & the Jazz Music of W. A. Mathieu, Nova Jazz Orchestra (Nova Jazz Orchestra, 2014)

=== The Sufi Choir ===
- The Best of the Sufi Choir (Cold Mountain Music, 2004, 2020)
- Remembrance (Cold Mountain Music, 1983; remastered, 2008; reissued on CD, 2011)
- The Sufi Choir sings Robert Bly's versions of Kabir (Cold Mountain Music, 1980; remastered, 2008; reissued on CD, 2011)
- Stone in the Sky (Cold Mountain Music, 1976; remastered, 2008; reissued on CD, 2011)
- The Sufi Dance & Song Record (Cold Mountain Music, 1975; remastered, 2008; reissued on CD, 2011)
- Cryin' for Joy (Cold Mountain Music, 1974; remastered, 2008; reissued on CD, 2011)
- The Sufi Choir aka The Blue Album (Cold Mountain Music, 1973; remastered, 2008; reissued on CD, 2011)

=== Audio books ===
- The Listening Book and The Musical Life – Audio Edition], 2-CD set (Manifest Spirit, 2008)

== Bibliography ==
- Bridge of Waves: What music is and how listening to it changes the world (2010) Shambhala Publications. ISBN 1-59030-732-1.
- The Listening Book: Discovering your own music (1991) Shambhala Publications. ISBN 0-87773-610-3.

An audio edition of The Listening Book was issued in 1991 by Shambhala Lion Editions. That audio material was remastered and issued along with new audio material read from The Musical Life in 2008 as a 2 CD set (W. A. Mathieu reads from The Listening Book and The Musical Life) on Manifest Spirit Records.

- The Musical Life: Reflections on what it is and how to live it (1994) Shambhala Publications. ISBN 0-87773-670-7.
- Harmonic Experience: Tonal harmony from its natural origins to its modern expression (1997) Inner Traditions Intl Ltd. ISBN 0-89281-560-4.

Harmonic Experience (561 pages) offers a view of music theory that harmonizes Western and Eastern perspectives. Understanding can be actively enhanced by utilizing its autodidactic ear-training and sight-singing exercises, especially using singing sargam syllables over a drone such as a tamboura or possibly a Western fifth played in just intonation. Mathieu is described as Neo-Riemannian and he cites Ernst Levy, who wrote of harmonic polarity and undertones, as an influence. The book has been praised by folk musician Pete Seeger.

- The Shrine Thief: Finding Wisdom in a Life of Music (2024) Terra Nova Press. ISBN 978-1-949597-29-5.
