= Kenton Live from the Las Vegas Tropicana =

Live album by Stan Kenton
- Released: 1961
- Recorded: February 2, 1959
- Venue: Tropicana Hotel, Las Vegas, NV
- Genre: Jazz
- Label: Capitol T/ST 1460
- Producer: Lee Gillette and Kent Larsen

Stan Kenton chronology
The Kenton Touch (1958)	Kenton Live from the Las Vegas Tropicana (1961)	Standards in Silhouette (1959)

Kenton Live from the Las Vegas Tropicana is a live album by bandleader and pianist Stan Kenton featuring a concert recorded at the Blue Room of the Tropicana Hotel in 1958 and released on the Capitol label.

== Reception ==
Professional ratings
Review scores
Source	Rating
Allmusic	4/5 stars
The Penguin Guide to Jazz Recordings	3/4 stars

The Allmusic review by Scott Yanow noted "This is admittedly not one of the classic Stan Kenton recordings but is generally superior to his studio recordings of the period".

== Track listing ==
All compositions by Stan Kenton except where noted.

1. "Artistry in Rhythm" – 3:25
2. "Bernie's Tune" (Bernie Miller, Jerry Leiber, Mike Stoller) – 3:29
3. "Tuxedo Junction" (Erskine Hawkins, Bill Johnson, Julian Dash, Buddy Feyne) – 2:59
4. "Street Scene" (Alfred Newman) – 2:59
5. "Puck's Blues" (Gene Roland) – 3:04
6. "I Concentrate on You" (Cole Porter) – 3:12
7. "The End of a Love Affair" (Edward Redding) – 4:41
8. "You and I and George" – 0:55
9. "Sentimental Riff" (Roland) – 4:09
10. "Random Riff" (Roland) – 3:33
11. "Artistry in Rhythm" – 0:47

== Personnel ==
- Stan Kenton – piano, conductor
- Joe Burnett, Bud Brisbois, Frank Huggins, Roger Middleton, Jack Sheldon – trumpet
- Jim Amlotte, Kent Larsen, Archie Le Coque, – trombone
- Bob Olson, Bill Smiley – bass trombone
- Lennie Niehaus – alto saxophone
- Richie Kamuca, Bill Trujillo – tenor saxophone
- Billy Root, Sture Swenson – baritone saxophone
- Red Kelly – bass, vocals
- Jerry McKenzie – drums
- Stan Kenton (track 1, 8 & 11), Lennie Niehaus (tracks 7 & 8), Johnny Richards (track 6), Gene Roland (tracks 2–5, 9 & 10) – arranger
