= Till (Roger Williams album) =

Studio album by Roger Williams
- Released: 1958
- Genre: Easy listening
- Label: Kapp

Till is an album by Roger Williams. It was released in 1958 on the Kapp label (catalog no. KL-1081).

The album debuted on Billboard magazine's popular albums chart on March 31, 1958, reached the No. 4 spot, and remained on that chart for 61 weeks. It was certified as a gold record by the RIAA.

AllMusic gave the album a rating of four-and-a-half stars. Reviewer Lindsay Planer wrote that it "aged remarkably well" with "melodies . . . slightly revised and incorporated into decidedly austere modernizations that work surprisingly well."

== Track listing ==
Side A

1. "Till"
2. "April Love"
3. "Arrivederci, Roma"
4. "Que Sera, Sera"
5. "Jalousie"
6. "The High and the Mighty"

Side B

1. "Fascination"
2. "Tammy"
3. "The Sentimental Touch"
4. "Oh, My Papa"
5. "Brahm's A Flat Waltz"
6. "Moonlight Love"
