= Songs of the Fabulous Fifties =

Studio album by Roger Williams
- Released: 1957
- Genre: Easy listening
- Label: Kapp

Songs of the Fabulous Fifties is a double album by Roger Williams. It was released in 1957 on the Kapp label (catalog no. KXL-5000).

The album debuted on Billboard magazine's popular albums chart on March 23, 1957, reached the No. 6 spot, and remained on that chart for 57 weeks. It was certified as a gold record by the RIAA.

AllMusic gave the album a rating of four-and-a-half stars.

== Track listing ==
Side A

1. "Blue Tango" (Leroy Anderson)
2. "Vaya con Dios" (Pepper*, James*, Russell)
3. "High Noon" (Dmitri Tiomkin, Ned Washington)
4. "Too Young" (Sid Lippman, Sylvia Dee)
5. "Because of You" (Arthur Hammerstein, Dudley Wilkinson)
6. Song from "The Moulin Rouge" (Georges Auric, William Engvick)

Side B

1. "Mister Sandman" (Pat Ballard)
2. "Wish You Were Here" (Harold Rome)
3. "Mona Lisa" (Jay Livingston, Ray Evans)
4. "Goodnight Irene" (Alan Lomax, Ledbetter)
5. "Secret Love" (Paul F. Webster, Sammy Fain)
6. "Love Is A Many-Splendored Thing" (Paul F. Webster, Sammy Fain)

Side C

1. "Moonglow" (DeLange, Mills, Hudson)
2. Theme From "Picnic" (George Duning, Steve Allen)
3. "Unchained Melody" (Alex North, Hy Zaret)
4. "Tennessee Waltz" (Pee Wee King, Redd Stewart)
5. "Hey There" (Jerry Ross, Richard Adler
6. "April In Portugal" (Larue, Kennedy, Galhardo, Ferrao)
7. "My Heart Cries For You" (Carl Sigman, Percy Faith)

Side D

1. "True Love" (Cole Porter)
2. "La Vie En Rose" (Louiguy, Mack David)
3. "Three Coins In The Fountain" (Jule Styne, Sammy Cahn)
4. "Young At Heart" (Carolyn Leigh, Johnny Richards)
5. "I Believe" (Stillman, Drake, Graham, Shirl)
6. "Autumn Leaves" (Prevert, Mercer, Kosma)
