= Harry Carroll =

American songwriter, pianist, and composer (1892–1962)

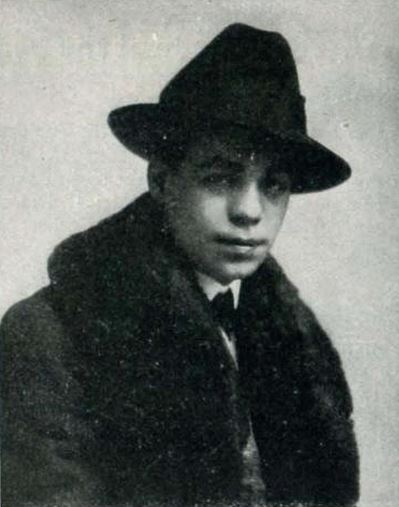
- Carroll in 1919

Background information
- Born: November 28, 1892; Atlantic City, New Jersey, United States
- Died: December 26, 1962 (aged 70) Santa Barbara, California, United States
- Occupations: Songwriter, pianist, composer
- Instrument: Piano

Harry Carroll (November 28, 1892 – December 26, 1962) was an American songwriter, pianist, and composer.

== Biography ==
Carroll was born in Atlantic City, New Jersey. He taught himself how to play the piano and began playing in movie houses before he finished grade school. After he graduated from high school, he moved to Pittsburgh and then New York City, where he worked as an arranger in Tin Pan Alley and at night entertained at the Garden Café and accompanied various vaudeville shows. He contributed the song (lyric by Ballard MacDonald) "Nix on the Glow Worm, Lena" to the Ziegfeld Follies of 1910.

In 1912, Carroll was hired by the Schubert brothers' Winter Garden productions as a contract writer. He worked with Arthur Fields to produce his first hit, On the Mississippi. In 1913 he again collaborated with Ballard MacDonald on the big hit song "The Trail of the Lonesome Pine." He wrote several Broadway stage scores including some popular favorites: "I'm Always Chasing Rainbows" (based on a section of Fantaisie-Impromptu by Frédéric Chopin), "By the Beautiful Sea" and "There's a Girl in the Heart of Maryland." Harry Carroll toured with vaudeville star Anna Wheaton for many years during this time.

Harry Carroll served as the director of ASCAP from 1914 to 1917. He later moved west to Los Angeles and became involved in early movies.

== Personal ==
Carroll's first marriage to Radio City Rockette, Estelle Cooper in 1921 ended in divorce in 1934. Carroll had two children with Estelle.

Carroll's second marriage was to singer and dancer Pauline Baker. They had two children. Harry and Pauline Carroll performed in Las Vegas and toured in the 1940s and together wrote "Say When," a song which Pauline introduced at Grace Hayes Lodge in the San Fernando Valley and was featured in Blackouts of 1942.

== Death ==
He died on December 26, 1962, in Santa Barbara, California.

== Legacy ==
In 1970, eight years after his death, Carroll was inducted into the Songwriters Hall of Fame. He is the only composer with two songs in the Hall of Fame's list of the Top 100 popular songs.
