= The Mel-Tones =

American vocal group of the 1940s and 1950s, formed and led by Mel Tormé

The Mel-Tones was an American vocal group of the 1940s and 1950s, formed and led by Mel Tormé. They are sometimes credited as The Meltones.

The Mel-Tones appeared on several radio programs and released several records on their own, and also as the vocalists on some of Artie Shaw's records.

Besides Tormé, the members were Betty Beveridge, Ginny O'Connor (who married Henry Mancini in 1947), Bernie Parke, and Sheldon ‘Diz’ Disrud (later replaced by Les Baxter). Tormé (still a teenager when he formed the group, in 1943) was lead singer and arranger. The group disbanded in 1945 or 1946, but Tormé reformed them from time to time for special projects. A 1957 release of Tormé's California Suite featured the Mel-Tones, with Loulie Jean Norman replacing Betty Beveridge. The Mel-Tones last album, Back in Town, was recorded in 1959 and released in 1960; personnel at that time was original members Ginny O'Connor and Bernie Parke, and Sue Allen and Tom Kenny.

== Selected discography ==
=== Singles ===
- "Where Or When" / "White Christmas"/ – The Mel-Tones (1945, Jewel)
- "It Happened In Monterrey" / "Born To Be Blue" – Mel Tormé And His Mel-Tones, with Sonny Burke And His Orchestra (1946, Musicraft)
- "Try A Little Tenderness" / "Willow Road" – Mel Tormé And His The Mel-Tones [sic] (1946, Musicraft)
- "I Got The Sun In The Morning" / "Along With Me" – Artie Shaw And His Orchestra, vocal by Mel Tormé and The Meltones[sic] (1946, Musicraft)
- "South America, Take It Away" / "Try A Little Tenderness" – Mel Tormé And His Mel-Tones, with Sonny Burke And His Orchestra (Musicraft, 1946)
- "Don't You Believe It Dear" (B-side of "Connecticut", which has vocals by Ralph Blane) – Artie Shaw and His Orchestra Featuring Mel Tormé and His Mel-Tones (Musicraft, 1946)
- "What Is This Thing Called Love?" — Artie Shaw Orchestra, Mel Torme & his Mel-Tones (1946, Musicraft)
- "Don't Do Something to Someone Else (That You Wouldn't Want Done to You)" (B-side of "The Blossoms On The Boug", which has vocals credited to Mel Tormé alone) – Mel Tormé And His Mel-Tones, with Frank De Vol and His Orchestra (Capitol, date unknown)

=== EPs ===
- Love For Sale – Artie Shaw and His Orchestra Also Featuring Mel Tormé and His Meltones (1965, A.R.C. Records)

=== Albums ===
- Artie Shaw and His Orchestra Featuring Mel Tormé and the Meltones (Society #SOC 983)
- Back In Town – Mel Tormé and the Meltones (1960, His Master's Voice #CLP 1382 (UK); 1960, Verve #MG VS 6063, #MVS 2675 (US))
- Artie Shaw and His Orchestra Also Featuring Mel Tormé and the Meltones (1965, Presto #PRE 681)
- Mel Tormé and the Meltones with Artie Shaw and His Orchestra (1965, Presto #PRE 685)
- Mel Tormé with the Meltones and Artie Shaw (1976, Everest Records Archive Of Folk & Jazz Music #FS 324)
- It Happened In Monterrey – Mel Tormé and the Mel-Tones with Sonny Burke & His Orchestra (1982, Musicraft #MVS-510)
- Mel Tormé Sings His California Suite – Mel Tormé with His Mel-Tones and Chorus Orchestra conducted by Harold Mooney (1984, Discovery #DS-910)
- Mel Tormé Live with the Mel-Tones, Volume One
- Mel Tormé Live with the Mel-Tones, Volume Two (1987, Sounds Great #SG-5012)
- Velvet Moods – Mel Tormé, the Mel-Tones (Él #ACMEM90CD)
- That's Where I Came In – Mel Tormé and the Mel-Tones (2006, GVC)
