= Ross Barbour (singer) =

American singer

- Birth name: Ross Edwin Barbour
- Born: December 31, 1928; Columbus, Indiana
- Died: August 20, 2011 (aged 82); Simi Valley, California
- Genres: Jazz, Classic pop, Barbershop
- Years active: 1948–1977

Ross Edwin Barbour (December 31, 1928 – August 20, 2011) was an American singer with the vocal quartet The Four Freshmen.

The Four Freshmen originated in early 1948 when brothers Ross and Don Barbour, then at Butler University's Arthur Jordan Conservatory of Music in Indianapolis, Indiana, formed a barbershop quartet called Hal's Harmonizers. The Harmonizers also included Marvin Pruitt — soon replaced by Ross and Don's cousin Bob Flanigan — and Hal Kratzsch (1925–70), replaced in 1953 by Ken Errair. The quartet soon adopted a more jazz-oriented repertoire and renamed itself the Toppers. At first, they were influenced by Glenn Miller's The Modernaires and Mel Tormé's Mel-Tones, but soon developed their own style of improvised vocal harmony. In September 1948, the quartet went on the road as The Four Freshmen, and soon drew the admiration of jazz legends such as Dizzy Gillespie and Woody Herman.

In 1950, The Four Freshmen got a break when band leader Stan Kenton heard the quartet in Dayton, Ohio, and arranged for an audition with his label, Capitol Records, which signed The Four later that year. In 1952, they released their first hit single "It's a Blue World". Further hits included "Mood Indigo" in 1954, "Day by Day" in 1955, and "Graduation Day" in 1956.

Throughout the 1950s and early 1960s, The Four Freshmen released a number of recordings, made film and television appearances, and performed in concert. The group eventually lost their mainstream following with the advent of the British pop bands of the 1960s. After Barbour's retirement in 1977, the Freshmen continued under the management of Flanigan, who kept the rights to The Four Freshmen name. Flanigan died on May 15, 2011, at the age of 84.

Barbour died of cancer on August 20, 2011, aged 82.
