= Inside the Music of Brian Wilson =

2007 book by Philip Lambert

- Author: Philip Lambert
- Subject: Brian Wilson
- Publisher: Bloomsbury Publishing
- Publication date: 2007
- Pages: 404
- ISBN: 978-0-8264-1877-7
- OCLC: 654236799

Inside the Music of Brian Wilson (subtitled The Songs, Sounds, and Influences of the Beach Boys' Founding Genius) is a 2007 book that analyzes the music of Brian Wilson of the Beach Boys, authored by American musicologist Philip Lambert. It is the first book dedicated primarily to Wilson's music, rather than his personal life.

== Background ==
Philip Lambert (1960–2022) was a professor of music at the CUNY Graduate Center in New York. He was initially known for specializing in the music of composer Charles Ives, and authored a book on the subject, The Music of Charles Ives (1997). After the mid-2000s, he specialized in popular music and musical theatre. His textbooks Basic Post-Tonal Theory (2018) and Analysis and Principles of Music (2017) are also widely used.

== Reception ==
In his review for PopMatters, Adam Bunch rued that the book has limited appeal to casual fans of the Beach Boys, as it requires the reader to have a rudimentary understanding of music theory. Quentin Rowan of the New York Post concurred, "Lambert himself is a professor of music theory, and at times, although enlightening, his prose borders on being for music scholars alone."

London Times reviewer Jesse Jarnow declared, "Lambert's work is extraordinary for what it is, examining the young songwriter piece by piece as Wilson teases out his own voice. It's not exactly poetry, but it is of extraordinary value." Academic Robert Iannapollo referred to it as the finest book ever written about the Beach Boys.
