= The Four Freshmen =

American male vocal quartet

- The Four Freshmen, c. 1962

Background information
- Origin: Indianapolis, Indiana, U.S.
- Genres: Jazz, traditional pop, barbershop
- Years active: 1948–present
- Labels: Capitol, Liberty
- Members: Tommy Boynton; Chris Peters; Jake Baldwin; Bob Ferreira
- Past members: Ross Barbour; Don Barbour; Hal Kratzsch; Bob Flanigan; Ken Errair; Bill Comstock; Ken Albers; Ray Brown; Autie Goodman; Dennis Grillo; Mike Beisner; Rod Henley; Dave Jennings; Newton Graber; Kirk Marcy; Garry Lee Rosenberg; Greg Stegeman; Kevin Stout; Alan MacIntosh; Vince Johnson; Brian Eichenberger; Curtis Calderon; Jon Gaines; Stein Malvey
- Website: fourfreshmen.com

The Four Freshmen are an American male vocal quartet founded in the barbershop tradition. Its influences include the big band vocal group sounds of The Modernaires, The Pied Pipers, and The Mel-Tones. The singers accompany themselves on guitar, horns, bass, and drums, among other instrumental configurations.

The group was founded in 1948 in Indiana and reached its peak popularity in the mid-1950s. The last original member retired in 1993, but the group continues to tour internationally. It has recorded jazz harmonies since its founding in the late 1940s in the halls of the Jordan School of Music at Butler University in Indianapolis.

== History ==
=== Early beginnings ===
Brothers Don and Ross Barbour grew up in a musical family in Columbus, Indiana, and had sung with their cousin Bob Flanigan as kids. In 1947, while attending the Arthur Jordan Conservatory of Music at Butler University in Indianapolis, Indiana, music theory classmate Hal Kratzsch convinced the Barbours that forming a barbershop quartet would be a great source of income, so they formed a barbershop quartet called Hal's Harmonizers. Kratzsch knew from instinct how to sing the bottom part; Don, with his wide vocal range, was tapped to sing the second part; and Ross, a natural baritone, took the third part. To sing the top part, they recruited classmate Marvin Pruitt. They would perform songs like "Sweet Adeline" at fairs and conventions while wearing armbands, exaggerated false mustaches, and waiters' aprons. Bored with the confinement of barbershop chords, and not wanting to give up their income base, they renamed themselves as the Toppers, and experimented with more complex chords and jazz arrangements. At first, the group was influenced by Glenn Miller's quartet, The Modernaires, and Mel Tormé's Mel-Tones, but soon developed its own style of improvised vocal harmony.

As the Toppers' popularity grew, Pruitt developed stage fright and resigned. Initially, they replaced him with Ross's girlfriend and future wife Nancy Sue Carson, but feeling that a fourth male voice would be more appropriate for the group's sound, the Barbour brothers contacted Flanigan, who was living in Greencastle, Indiana and had previously been part of a high school quintet singing songs inspired by the Modernaires, to become their new lead singer. In the meantime, they started accompanying themselves with musical instruments: Don, having played guitar through high school and a couple of years in Arabia with the Air Force, on guitar; Ross, first on piano, then on drums; Flanigan, who played trombone through his army time in Germany, except when the dance band needed a bass player, alternating between string bass and trombone, and Kratzsch, who played trumpet in high school and in the Navy in the South Pacific, on trumpet, mellophone and string bass. Soon, the group dropped out of school and drove to Chicago, where they met agent Dick Shelton. As he already had a group called the Cottontoppers, he renamed them as the Freshmen Four, which they reversed to the Four Freshmen. They made their debut at Fort Wayne's 113 Club on September 20, 1948, and nearly lost the job since the manager had never heard jazz chords, but his daughter had a crush on Kratzsch, allowing them to stay for a week.

=== Initial success ===
Soon, the Four Freshmen drew the admiration of jazz legends such as Dizzy Gillespie and Woody Herman. On March 21, 1950, Stan Kenton heard the quartet at the Esquire Lounge in Dayton, Ohio. He "had been told at his own show earlier that night about a quartet in town that sounded like his 43-piece ensemble", and was sufficiently impressed that on April 14, he arranged for an audition with his label, Capitol Records, which signed them later that year. The demo included "Laura", "Basin' Street Blues", "Dry Bones", and two other songs. In 1950, they released a single, "Mr. B's Blues", and appeared in their first and only film, Rich, Young and Pretty, where they sang "How D'Ya Like Your Eggs In The Morning" with Jane Powell and Vic Damone. The Freshmen released another single in 1951, "Now You Know", which was not a commercial success. Later in the year Capitol rejected their proposed next single, "It's a Blue World", and dropped them from the label. In May of the following year, a furious Stan Kenton demanded that the record company send them the demo tapes so that they could promote the song themselves. They managed to get the song onto the radio, and in 1952, "It's a Blue World" became their first charted single. Capitol re-signed the group in July of the same year.

In 1953, Hal Kratzsch, now married, grew tired of touring and wanted to return to his hometown in Warsaw, Indiana to settle down. He announced to the others his intention to leave as soon as a replacement was found. In spring that year, while performing at the Crest Lounge in Detroit, a patron suggested they audition Ken Errair, a friend of his. Errair, a tool and die maker by day, and spent his nights playing "society music" with several bands in the area, had a booming, deep voice and a good ear for harmony. He picked up Kratzsch's trumpet and mellophone parts and quickly learned the bass, becoming a full-time Freshman in May 1953. Their single to chart was "It Happened Once Before", and the year ended with them winning the DownBeat magazine poll as Best Jazz Vocal Group of 1953.

In 1954, the Freshmen recorded their first album, Voices in Modern. "Mood Indigo" and "Day By Day", singles from this album, charted. The following year, they released "How Can I Tell Her" and "Charmaine", followed by "Graduation Day" in 1956. The group's second album Four Freshmen and 5 Trombones "set the standard for modern jazz vocal groups" and reached number 6.

After only a short time with the group, Ken Errair, who had just married Jane Withers, left to settle into his married life in California. While informing his bandmates about his decision to leave, he recommended singer-songwriter and member of the Stuarts, Ken Albers. Errair would release an album on Capitol in 1957, Solo Session, before retiring from music to become a successful real estate developer in California. Around this time, the group began to perform at college auditoriums and to pursue a younger audience.

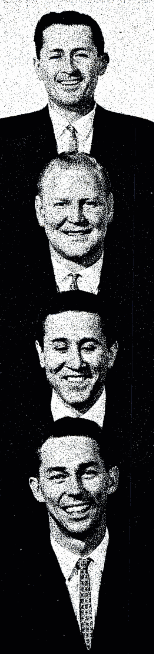
The Four Freshmen in a 1965 advertisement

In 1960, the Freshmen recorded "Their Hearts Were Full of Spring", a song which, with different lyrics, became The Beach Boys' "A Young Man Is Gone" in 1963. The group eventually lost its mainstream following with the advent of the rock bands of the 1960s, even as one of those bands, the Beach Boys, cited the Four Freshmen as one of its main influences. Don Barbour, unhappy with the direction the group had been taking with its material, which was away from the blues and saloon numbers and more toward mainstream pop, left the group on amicable terms in September 1960. He began working on a solo album in June 1961, but before it was released, he was killed in an automobile accident in Hollywood on October 5, 1961. Meanwhile, the group replaced him with Bill Comstock, who had performed with Albers in the Stuarts.

Ken Errair died in a plane crash on June 14, 1968. Two years later, original member Hal Kratzsch died of cancer on October 18, 1970.

=== 1970s and 1980s ===
The lineup of Barbour, Flanigan, Albers and Comstock continued for 13 years, until the end of 1972 when Comstock decided to take time off touring to care for his ailing wife Sue. Ray Brown, a fan of the Four Freshmen since 12 who offered himself as a replacement during a show in Florida, made his debut in March 1973, marking the first time keyboards are featured instead of the guitar. This lineup released the album Mount Freshmore in 1977.

In 1977, Ross Barbour retired to go into the real estate business in California, after spending 29 years with the Freshmen. At the same time, Ray Brown also departed, choosing to step away from the road and spend more time with his growing family. Replacing them were Autie Goodman, who had spent 11 years with the Modernaires, and Dennis Grillo, a jazz composer and arranger who worked with numerous bands. Goodman sang the second part and played saxophone and drums, while Grillo sang the third part and played trumpet and flugelhorn. As such, they could carry their own set of horns, an arrangement that lasted until the 1990s.

Ken Albers retired from the group in February 1982. As a result, Dennis Grillo temporarily took over the fourth part, while Mike Beisner, a student under the Stan Kenton Band Clinics, was brought in to sing the third part, as well as to play trumpet, flugelhorn and keyboards. With Grillo leaving a month later to become a professor at the Berklee College of Music, Rod Henley, who led the Hotlanta Jazz Singers and has played together with former Freshman Ray Brown in the Fancy Colors, became his replacement, while playing trumpet, trombone, flugelhorn and keyboards. Henley had previously been offered as a replacement for Comstock as early as 1972 at Brown's recommendation, though Brown was selected instead. In 1986, they released the album Fresh!, featuring a more modern arrangement as well as covers of 1970s and 1980s hits.

Rod Henley left the Four Freshmen in 1986, his place taken over by Dave Jennings and then Newton Graber. Despite returning briefly in 1987, he soon departed for a second time, and Seattle-based high school teacher Kirk Marcy was recruited as the group's bass singer in September that year. In 1988, they made an appearance on Mother's Day with Joan Lunden, where they were joined by Lunden's husband-producer Michael A. Krauss on "Day By Day". In August 1988, Marcy left to become the director of Edmonds College's vocal jazz ensemble Soundsation, and was replaced by Garry Lee Rosenberg.

In 1989, Mike Beisner was offered the role of musical director for talk show Everyday with Joan Lunden, resulting in his departure from the group. While he and Flanigan were searching for a replacement, they came across a 1988 demo from a then-39-year-old Greg Stegeman, featuring him singing all four parts and playing keyboards and horns. Stegeman, who was working as music director and disc jockey at KRML, responded to a phone call from Flanigan, resulting in him becoming a fully-fledged member of the Four Freshmen.

While touring with Woody Herman's band in 1990, Flanigan suffered from a heart attack and would require heart surgery. With a few weeks left in the tour, Stegeman offered to take the top part, while Beisner temporarily returned following the commercial failure of Lunden's talk show. When Flanigan was well enough to resume touring, Stegeman returned to singing the third part while Beisner departed for a second time.

=== The 1990s and 50th anniversary special ===
In April 1991, Garry Lee Rosenberg left, leaving a permanent opening for Mike Beisner to return, this time singing the bass part. In 1992, both Bob Flanigan and Autie Goodman made the decision to come off the road. Despite the retirement of Flanigan, the last original member, the group did not disband, with Flanigan managing them. Taking their places were Bob Ferreira, a student of former member Kirk Marcy at the Edmonds College who auditioned for the group at Marcy's recommendation, and Kevin Stout, a freelance jazz trombonist in Las Vegas. Ferreira handled drums and bass vocals, while Stout played guitar, bass and trombone. As Stout could not sing at the top, he took the third part, with Stegeman taking on the high notes and Beisner singing the second part. Flanigan introduced the new Freshmen lineup at the 1992 Four Freshmen Convention in Columbus, Ohio.

Mike Beisner came off the road for good in 1994. Greg Stegeman, who was then the most senior member, took on more of a leadership role, while Alan MacIntosh joined, singing the second part and playing bass, keyboards, and trumpet. Two years later, MacIntosh discovered that the road did not suit him, so he resigned from the group, with Brian Eichenberger, a 19-year-old guitarist and bassist who was studying jazz arranging and performance under Phil Mattson at the Southwestern Community College's School for Music Vocations in Creston, Iowa, recruited to fill his position. Stegeman continued to sing the high part until well after Eichenberger joined, but when it was discovered that the latter possessed a true tenor voice, they ended up swapping parts.

In 1998, the Four Freshmen were featured in a CBS special titled "The Four Freshmen: 50 Years Fresh!", hosted by Maureen McGovern to commemorate the 50th anniversary since their founding. This special features performances from not only then-current members Greg Stegeman, Kevin Stout, Bob Ferreira and Brian Eichenberger, but also former members Ross Barbour, Bob Flanigan, Bill Comstock and Mike Beisner. Towards the end, both groups came together to perform a reprise of "It's A Blue World", as well as "Fools Rush In", "Candy" and "Poinciana", which were not featured in the original broadcast.

Kevin Stout left the group in December 1999 after a seven-year stint, following which he would collaborate regularly with high school friend and saxophonist Brian Booth. In his place was Vince Johnson, who had previously worked as an accompanist, educator and performer, and had performed throughout the world while with Princess Cruises.

=== 2000s, 2010s and 2020s ===
Greg Stegeman retired from the group in 2001, but continued to serve as an advisor to the Four Freshmen Music Foundation. While searching for a replacement, Brian Eichenberger encountered Curtis Calderon performing at The Landing jazz club in San Antonio. Calderon, who had toured with Russ Morgan's big band, was tapped to sing the second part and play trumpet and flugelhorn.

Ken Albers died on April 19, 2007, at the age of 82.

Former member Mike Beisner died of natural causes on July 6, 2008, at the age of 53.

Bob Flanigan died on May 15, 2011, at the age of 84 from congestive heart failure. Last original member Ross Barbour died on August 20, 2011, at the age of 82 from cancer.

Dennis Grillo died on October 31, 2011, at the age of 81.

Vince Johnson, who had spent 13 years with the Four Freshmen, decided to leave the group in fall 2013 to explore more opportunities in the field of music. Replacing him was Stein Malvey, who had previously collaborated with Brian Eichenberger on his 2009 solo album one under the alias iKE. With Malvey singing the second tenor part and playing guitar, Eichenberger made the bass his primary instrument while Calderon took over the baritone part.

In January 2015, Brian Eichenberger left to tour with the Beach Boys, after spending 18 years with the Four Freshmen. He contacted Phil Mattson, the director of the School for Music Vocations, who recommended Tommy Boynton, then an adjunct professor at his alma mater. Boynton took over the lead voice and played bass.

Former member Bill Comstock died on November 22, 2016, at the age of 92.

In end 2016, Curtis Calderon left the group to spend more time with his growing family. They began searching for a replacement, which ended up being Jon Gaines. Ferreira then sent Gaines charts of the Four Freshmen's most popular tunes, six at a time, so that he could learn the third vocal part. This was followed by a week of rehearsals with the other three musicians until he was comfortable enough to go on the road.

Longtime member Autie Goodman died in his sleep on December 20, 2018, at the age of 93.

On February 21 and 22, 2020, the Four Freshmen played two sets at the Dirty Dog Jazz Cafe in Michigan, with Minneapolis-based jazz trumpeter Jake Baldwin in place of Jon Gaines, causing fans to start questioning if Gaines had left the group. In response, the group posted on their social media on April 9, confirming Gaines's departure and Baldwin's entry as an official member. Baldwin had previously studied alongside Boynton at the New England Conservatory of Music, and was recommended to Ferreira to replace the departing Gaines, who left to tend to his family.

Former member Ray Brown died of complications related to COVID-19 on November 11, 2020, at the age of 81.

Stein Malvey left in November 2020 to pursue other musical ventures, after spending seven years in the group. Tommy Boynton moved to guitar and second part vocals, while bringing in Ryan Howe, a fellow faculty member and graduate of the School for Music Vocations, to sing lead and play bass. This new lineup made its debut in Largo, Florida on November 15. However, following Howe's diagnosis with multiple sclerosis that affected the use of his hands, he stopped playing bass with the group starting May 2022, instead they would bring in external musicians to play upright bass with them during their gigs.

On July 14, 2025, Ryan Howe left the group and Chris Peters was brought in to sing lead and play bass.

== Style ==
According to The New Grove Dictionary of Music and Musicians:

The group represented a modernizing force in the sphere of close harmony quartets in American popular music, moving away from the barbershop style to introduce elements of jazz. In doing so, they influenced younger groups such as the Hi-Los and the Beach Boys.

The Oxford Companion to Popular Music says:

They sing with great variety, in quiet unison or full-throated harmony, using modern jazz harmonies and varied dynamics, a considerable advance on the typical close-harmony quartets that had preceded them.

== Influence ==
The Four Freshmen were an important influence on Brian Wilson of The Beach Boys, beginning in the mid-1950s. He listened to one of their albums, Four Freshmen and 5 Trombones, and it "mesmerized" him. He spoke very highly of it: "'It brings a feeling of love inside me.... That feeling of harmony.'" Aside from listening to their music, the teenage Wilson made a point of seeing the Four Freshmen perform live: "he made solitary pilgrimages to the resort hotels of Catalina Island to see the Four Freshmen."

The Four Freshmen are also credited with influencing The Lettermen, The Four Preps and The Manhattan Transfer, among other vocal groups.

The Donald Fagen song "Maxine", from his 1982 50s-themed album The Nightfly, in which Fagen accompanies himself on four-part harmonies, has been described as inspired by the Four Freshmen. The Four Freshmen covered the song on their 1986 album Fresh!

== Awards and honors ==
The Four Freshmen have won JazzTimes magazine's Readers Poll for Best Vocal Group multiple years.

The group won DownBeat magazine's Readers Poll for Best Vocal Group in 1953, 1954, 1955, 1956, 1958, 2000, and 2001.

The Freshmen have been nominated for a Grammy Award six times.

== Members ==
Current members

- Bob Ferreira – bass vocals, drums (1992–present), flugelhorn (1992–1999)
- Tommy Boynton – first tenor vocals, bass (2015–2020), second tenor vocals, guitar, keyboards (2020–present)
- Jake Baldwin – baritone vocals, trumpet, flugelhorn (2020–present)
- Chris Peters – first tenor vocals, bass (2025–present)

Former members

- Hal Kratzsch – bass vocals, trumpet, mellophone, bass (1948–1953; died 1970)
- Don Barbour – second tenor vocals, guitar (1948–1960; died 1961)
- Ross Barbour – baritone vocals, drums (1948–1977; guest 1998; died 2011)
- Bob Flanigan – first tenor vocals, trombone, bass (1948–1990, 1990–1992; guest 1998; died 2011)
- Ken Errair – bass vocals, trumpet, flugelhorn, bass (1953–1956; died 1968)
- Ken Albers – bass vocals, trumpet, mellophone, bass (1956–1982; died 2007)
- Bill Comstock – second tenor vocals, guitar (1960–1973; guest 1998; died 2016)
- Ray Brown – second tenor vocals, keyboards (1973–1977; died 2020)
- Autie Goodman – second tenor vocals, saxophone, drums (1977–1992; died 2018)
- Dennis Grillo – baritone vocals (1977–1982), bass vocals (1982), trumpet, flugelhorn (1977–1982) (died 2011)
- Mike Beisner – baritone vocals (1982–1989, 1990), bass vocals (1991–1992; guest 1998), second tenor vocals (1992–1994), trumpet, flugelhorn, trombone, keyboards (1982–1989, 1990, 1991–1994; guest 1998) (died 2008)
- Rod Henley – bass vocals, trumpet, trombone, flugelhorn (1982–1986, 1987)
- Dave Jennings – bass vocals, trumpet (1986–1987)
- Newton Graber – bass vocals, trumpet (1987; died 1995)
- Kirk Marcy – bass vocals, trumpet, trombone, keyboards (1987–1988)
- Garry Lee Rosenberg – bass vocals, trumpet, flugelhorn, keyboards (1988–1991)
- Greg Stegeman – baritone vocals (1989–1990, 1990–1992), first tenor vocals (1990, 1992–1999), second tenor vocals (1999–2001) trumpet, flugelhorn, keyboards (1989–2001)
- Kevin Stout – baritone vocals, guitar, bass, trombone (1992–1999)
- Alan MacIntosh – second tenor vocals, bass, keyboards, trumpet (1994–1996)
- Brian Eichenberger – second tenor vocals (1996–1999), first tenor vocals (1999–2014), guitar, bass, keyboards (1996–2014)
- Vince Johnson – baritone vocals, bass, guitar, trombone (1999–2013)
- Curtis Calderon – second tenor vocals (2001–2013), baritone vocals (2013–2016), trumpet, flugelhorn (2001–2016)
- Stein Malvey – second tenor vocals, guitar (2013–2020)
- Jon Gaines – baritone vocals, trumpet, flugelhorn (2017–2020)
- Ryan Howe – first tenor vocals, bass (2020–2025)

=== Lineups ===
1948–1953 ("Group #1")	1953–1956 ("Group #2")	1956–1960 ("Group #3")	1960–1973 ("Group #4")
Hal Kratzsch – bass vocals, trumpet, mellophone, bass; Don Barbour – second tenor vocals, guitar; Ross Barbour – baritone vocals, drums; Bob Flanigan – first tenor vocals, trombone, bass	Don Barbour – second tenor vocals, guitar; Ross Barbour – baritone vocals, drums; Bob Flanigan – first tenor vocals, trombone, bass; Ken Errair – bass vocals, trumpet, flugelhorn, bass	Don Barbour – second tenor vocals, guitar; Ross Barbour – baritone vocals, drums; Bob Flanigan – first tenor vocals, trombone, bass; Ken Albers – bass vocals, trumpet, mellophone, bass	Ross Barbour – baritone vocals, drums; Bob Flanigan – first tenor vocals, trombone, bass; Ken Albers – bass vocals, trumpet, mellophone, bass; Bill Comstock – second tenor vocals, guitar
1973–1977 ("Group #5")	1977–1982 ("Group #6")	1982 ("Group #7")	1982–1986 ("Group #8")
Ross Barbour – baritone vocals, drums; Bob Flanigan – first tenor vocals, trombone, bass; Ken Albers – bass vocals, trumpet, mellophone, bass; Ray Brown – second tenor vocals, keyboards	Bob Flanigan – first tenor vocals, trombone, bass; Ken Albers – bass vocals, trumpet, mellophone, bass; Autie Goodman – second tenor vocals, saxophone, drums; Dennis Grillo – baritone vocals, trumpet, flugelhorn	Bob Flanigan – first tenor vocals, trombone, bass; Autie Goodman – second tenor vocals, saxophone, drums; Dennis Grillo – bass vocals, trumpet, flugelhorn; Mike Beisner – baritone vocals, trumpet, flugelhorn, trombone, keyboards	Bob Flanigan – first tenor vocals, trombone, bass; Autie Goodman – second tenor vocals, saxophone, drums; Mike Beisner – baritone vocals, trumpet, flugelhorn, trombone, keyboards; Rod Henley – bass vocals, trumpet, trombone, flugelhorn
1986–1987 ("Group #9")	1987 ("Group #10")	1987 ("Group #11")	1987–1988 ("Group #12")
Bob Flanigan – first tenor vocals, trombone, bass; Autie Goodman – second tenor vocals, saxophone, drums; Mike Beisner – baritone vocals, trumpet, flugelhorn, trombone, keyboards; Dave Jennings – bass vocals, trumpet	Bob Flanigan – first tenor vocals, trombone, bass; Autie Goodman – second tenor vocals, saxophone, drums; Mike Beisner – baritone vocals, trumpet, flugelhorn, trombone, keyboards; Newton Graber – bass vocals, trumpet	Bob Flanigan – first tenor vocals, trombone, bass; Autie Goodman – second tenor vocals, saxophone, drums; Mike Beisner – baritone vocals, trumpet, flugelhorn, trombone, keyboards; Rod Henley – bass vocals, trumpet, trombone, flugelhorn	Bob Flanigan – first tenor vocals, trombone, bass; Autie Goodman – second tenor vocals, saxophone, drums; Mike Beisner – baritone vocals, trumpet, flugelhorn, trombone, keyboards; Kirk Marcy – bass vocals, trumpet, trombone, keyboards
1988–1989 ("Group #13")	1989–1990 ("Group #14")	1990 ("Group #15")	1990–1991 ("Group #16")
Bob Flanigan – first tenor vocals, trombone, bass; Autie Goodman – second tenor vocals, saxophone, drums; Mike Beisner – baritone vocals, trumpet, flugelhorn, trombone, keyboards; Garry Lee Rosenberg – bass vocals, trumpet, flugelhorn, keyboards	Bob Flanigan – first tenor vocals, trombone, bass; Autie Goodman – second tenor vocals, saxophone, drums; Garry Lee Rosenberg – bass vocals, trumpet, flugelhorn, keyboards; Greg Stegeman – baritone vocals, trumpet, flugelhorn, keyboards	Autie Goodman – second tenor vocals, saxophone, drums; Mike Beisner – baritone vocals, trumpet, flugelhorn, trombone, keyboards; Garry Lee Rosenberg – bass vocals, trumpet, flugelhorn, keyboards; Greg Stegeman – first tenor vocals, trumpet, flugelhorn, keyboards	Bob Flanigan – first tenor vocals, trombone, bass; Autie Goodman – second tenor vocals, saxophone, drums; Garry Lee Rosenberg – bass vocals, trumpet, flugelhorn, keyboards; Greg Stegeman – baritone vocals, trumpet, flugelhorn, keyboards
1991–1992 ("Group #17")	1992–1994 ("Group #18")	1994–1996 ("Group #19")	1996–1999 ("Group #20")
Bob Flanigan – first tenor vocals, trombone, bass; Autie Goodman – second tenor vocals, saxophone, drums; Mike Beisner – bass vocals, trumpet, flugelhorn, trombone, keyboards; Greg Stegeman – baritone vocals, trumpet, flugelhorn, keyboards	Mike Beisner – second tenor vocals, trumpet, flugelhorn, trombone, keyboards, keyboard bass; Greg Stegeman – first tenor vocals, trumpet, flugelhorn, keyboards, keyboard bass; Kevin Stout – baritone vocals, guitar, bass, trombone; Bob Ferreira – bass vocals, drums, flugelhorn	Greg Stegeman – first tenor vocals, trumpet, flugelhorn, keyboards; Kevin Stout – baritone vocals, guitar, bass, trombone; Bob Ferreira – bass vocals, drums, flugelhorn; Alan MacIntosh – second tenor vocals, bass, keyboards, trumpet	Greg Stegeman – first tenor vocals, trumpet, flugelhorn, keyboards; Kevin Stout – baritone vocals, guitar, bass, trombone; Bob Ferreira – bass vocals, drums, flugelhorn; Brian Eichenberger – second tenor vocals, bass, keyboards
1999–2001 ("Group #21")	2001–2013 ("Group #22")	2013–2014 ("Group #23")	2015–2016 ("Group #24")
Greg Stegeman – second tenor vocals, trumpet, flugelhorn, keyboards; Bob Ferreira – bass vocals, drums; Brian Eichenberger – first tenor vocals, guitar, bass, keyboards; Vince Johnson – baritone vocals, bass, guitar, trombone	Bob Ferreira – bass vocals, drums; Brian Eichenberger – first tenor vocals, guitar, bass, keyboards; Vince Johnson – baritone vocals, bass, guitar, trombone; Curtis Calderon – second tenor vocals, trumpet, flugelhorn, keyboards	Bob Ferreira – bass vocals, drums; Brian Eichenberger – first tenor vocals, bass, keyboards; Curtis Calderon – baritone vocals, trumpet, flugelhorn, keyboards; Stein Malvey – second tenor vocals, guitar	Bob Ferreira – bass vocals, drums; Curtis Calderon – baritone vocals, trumpet, flugelhorn, keyboards; Stein Malvey – second tenor vocals, guitar; Tommy Boynton – first tenor vocals, bass
2017–2020 ("Group #25")	2020 ("Group #26")	2020–2025 ("Group #27")	2025–present ("Group #28")
Bob Ferreira – bass vocals, drums; Stein Malvey – second tenor vocals, guitar; Tommy Boynton – first tenor vocals, bass; Jon Gaines – baritone vocals, trumpet, flugelhorn	Bob Ferreira – bass vocals, drums; Stein Malvey – second tenor vocals, guitar; Tommy Boynton – first tenor vocals, bass; Jake Baldwin – baritone vocals, trumpet, flugelhorn	Bob Ferreira – bass vocals, drums; Tommy Boynton – second tenor vocals, guitar, keyboards; Jake Baldwin – baritone vocals, trumpet, flugelhorn; Ryan Howe – first tenor vocals, bass	Bob Ferreira – bass vocals, drums; Tommy Boynton – second tenor vocals, guitar, keyboards; Jake Baldwin – baritone vocals, trumpet, flugelhorn; Chris Peters – first tenor vocals, bass

== Discography ==
- Voices in Modern (Capitol, 1952, No. 8 US)
- Four Freshmen and 5 Trombones (Capitol, 1955, No. 6 US)
- Freshmen Favorites (Capitol, 1956, No. 11 US)
- 4 Freshmen and 5 Trumpets (Capitol, 1957, No. 9 US)
- 4 Freshmen and 5 Saxes (Capitol, 1957, No. 25 US)
- The Four Freshmen at Penn State (1957)
- Voices in Latin (Capitol, 1958)
- Voices in Love (Capitol, 1958)
- The Four Freshmen in Person (Capitol, 1958, No. 17 US)
- Road Show with Stan Kenton, June Christy (Capitol, 1959)
- The Four Freshmen and Five Guitars (Capitol, 1959)
- 4 Freshmen and 5 Guitars (Capitol, 1959, No. 40 US)
- Love Lost (Capitol, 1959)
- Freshmen Favorites Vol. 2 (Capitol, 1959)
- First Affair (Capitol, 1960)
- Voices and Brass (Capitol, 1960)
- Voices in Fun (Capitol, 1961)
- The Freshman Year (Capitol, 1961)
- Stars in Our Eyes (Capitol, 1962)
- The Swingers (Capitol, 1962)
- In Person Volume 2 (Capitol, 1963)
- The Four Freshmen Got That Feelin' (Capitol, 1963)
- Guest Star with the Clark Sisters (U.S. Department of The Treasury, 1963)
- Funny How Time Slips Away (Capitol, 1964)
- More 4 Freshmen and 5 Trombones (Capitol, 1964)
- The Four Freshmen Sing (Coronet, 1967)
- A Today Kind of Thing (Liberty, 1968)
- Today Is Tomorrow! (Liberty, 1968)
- In a Class by Themselves (Liberty, 1969)
- Different Strokes (Liberty, 1969)
- The Four Freshmen in Tokyo '68 (Liberty, 1969)
- Return to Romance: The Greatest Hits of The Four Freshmen, Sung for the 70's (Stylist, 1970)
- Live at Butler University with Stan Kenton (Creative World, 1972)
- Skitch & Company (Army Reserve 1974)
- A Taste of Honey (Pickwick 1976)
- Mount Freshmore (Kahoots, 1977)
- Alive and Well in Nashville (Phonorama, 1982)
- Fresh! (Pausa, 1986)
- Freshmas! (Ranwood, 1992)
- Graduation Day (Laserlight, 1992)
- Voices in Standards (Hindsight, 1994)
- Day By Day (Hindsight, 1994)
- It's a Blue World (Viper's Nest, 1995)
- Angel Eyes (Viper's Nest, 1995)
- Through the Years (Four Freshmen Society, 1997)
- Live At Penn State (Four Freshmen Society, 1997)
- Golden Anniversary Celebration (EMI-Capitol, 1998)
- Still Fresh (Pat Boone's Gold Label 1999)
- In Session (Self Released 2005)
- Snowfall (Self-released, 2007)
- Live From Las Vegas (Four Freshmen Society, 2009)
- The Four Freshmen & LIVE Trombones (Four Freshmen Society, 2009)
- Love Songs (Four Freshmen Society, 2012)
- Live At The Franklin Theatre (Four Freshmen Society, 2014)
- Four Freshmen And Friends (Four Freshmen Society, 2015)
- The Four Freshmen: Featuring Emmet Cohen, Russell Hall, & Kyle Poole (Four Freshmen Society, 2022)
- The Four Freshmen: Featuring Emmet Cohen, Russell Hall, & Kyle Poole vol. 2 (Four Freshmen Society, 2025)

=== Compilations ===
- The Best of the Four Freshmen (Capitol, 1961)
- The Fabulous Four Freshman (Pickwick/33, 1970)
- Capitol Collectors Series (Capitol, 1991)
- Greatest Hits / All Original Recordings (Curb, 1993)
- 22 Legendary Hits (CEMA Special Markets, 1995)

=== Singles ===
- Stan Kenton's Orchestra September Song (1951), Capitol 382
- "Mr. B's Blues"/"Then I'll Be Happy" (11/50), Capitol 1293
- "Now You Know"/"Pick Up Your Tears and Go Home" (4/51), Capitol 1377
- "It's a Blue World"/"Tuxedo Junction" (7/52), Capitol 2152
- "The Day Isn't Long Enough"/"Stormy Weather" (11/52), Capitol 2286
- "Poinciana"/"Baltimore Oriole" (4/53), Capitol 2398
- "Holiday"/"It Happened Once Before" (8/53), Capitol 2564
- "Seems Like Old Times"/"Crazy Bones" (Note: Frankie Carlson (of "Golden Wedding" fame) played drums on "Crazy Bones".) (2/54), Capitol 2745
- "I'll Be Seeing You"/"Please Remember" (6/54), Capitol 2832
- "We'll Be Together Again"/"My Heart Stood Still" (8/54), Capitol 2898
- "Mood Indigo"/"Love Turns Winter to Spring" (10/54), Capitol 2961
- "It Never Occurred to Me"/"Malaya" (3/55), Capitol 3070
- "Day By Day"/"How Can I Tell Her" (6/55), Capitol 3154
- "Charmaine"/"In This Whole Wide World" (11/55), Capitol 3292
- "Angel Eyes"/"Love Is Just Around the Corner" (2/56), Capitol 3359
- "Graduation Day"/"Lonely Night in Paris" (4/56), Capitol 3410
- "He Who Loves and Runs Away"/"You're So Far Above Me" (9/56), Capitol 3532
- "That's the Way I Feel"/"What's It Gonna Be" (2/57), Capitol 3652
- "Julie Is Her Name"/"Sometimes I'm Happy" (8/57), Capitol 3779
- "How Can I Begin to Tell"/"Granada" (11/57), Capitol 3832
- "Whistle Me Some Blues"/"Nights Are Longer" (3/58), Capitol 3930
- "Don't Worry Bout Me"/"I Never Knew" (??), Capitol
- "Candy"/"Route 66" (2/60), Capitol 4341
- "Teach Me Tonight"/"Shangri-La" (6/62), Capitol 4749
- "I'm Gonna Go Fishin'"/"Taps Miller" (9/62), Capitol 4824
- "Summertime"/"Baby Won't You Please Come Home" (6/63), Capitol 5007
- "Funny How Time Slips Away"/"Charade" (11/63), Capitol 5083
- "My Baby's Gone"/"Don't Make Me Sorry" (3/64), Capitol 5151
- "When I Stop Lovin' You"/"Nights Are Long" (4/65), Capitol 5401
- "Old Cape Cod"/"Men in Their Flying Machines" (8/65), Capitol 5471
- "Cry"/"Nowhere to Go" (12/66), Decca 32070
- "Cherish"/"Come Fly with Me" (6/68), Liberty 56047
- "Windy"/"Up, Up and Away"
- "Blue World"/"Phoenix" (4/69), Liberty 56099
- "My Special Angel"
- "I Want to Love"/"While I'm Young", Capitol F 3539 (Ken Errair solo)
- "Ain't Goin' Nowhere"
- "How About Me", Capitol F 3890 (Ken Errair Quartet)
- "How's About Tomorrow Night"
- "The Creep"/"Tenderly" (2/54), Capitol 2685 (Four Freshmen sing on Tenderly)

=== Promotional singles ===
- "It's a Blue World"/"Poinciana", Capitol PRO 862
- "You're So Far Above Me"/"Brazil", Capitol PRO 863
- "Every Time We Say Goodbye"/"Circus", Capitol PRO 864
- "Whistle Me Some Blues"/"It Never Occurred to Me", Capitol PRO 865
- "You Stepped Out of a Dream"/"I May Be Wrong", Capitol PRO 866
- "Baltimore Oriole"/"It Could Happen to You", Capitol Pro 867
- "Accentuate the Positive"/"I Want to Be Happy", Capitol PRO 1822
- "We've Got a World That Swings"/"When My Sugar Walks Down the Street", Capitol PRO 2392 (red vinyl)
- "It Never Occurred to Me"/"Malaya", Capitol PRO 2969
- "How Can I Tell Her"/"Day by Day", Capitol PRO 3070
- "Angel Eyes"/"Love Is Just Around the Corner", Capitol PRO 3154
- "I Want to Love While I'm Still Young"/"Ain't Goin' Nowhere" (Ken Errair), Capitol PRO 3359
- "Give Me the Simple Life" (1/12/62)/"Say it Isn't So" (not a Four Freshman cut), USAF presents Music in the Air
- "Nowhere to Go"/"Cry", Decca 32070

=== 7 inch, 33 1/3 promotional singles ===
- "Here's Hollywood"/"And So It's Over", Capitol PRO 2402
- "Moon River"/"Dynaflow", Capitol PRO 2449
- "Blue World"/"Poinciana", Capitol PRO 2510
- "Li'l Darlin'"/"Lulu's Back in Town", Capitol XE 1753
- "Candy"/"It Could Happen to You", Capitol XE 1640
- "Atchison, Topeka and Santa Fe"/"While You Are Gone"
- "Day By Day"/"Little Girl Blue"
- "Moonlight Rain"
- "I'm Beginning to See the Light"/"It's a Blue World"
