= Ken Albers =

American singer

- Born: John Kenneth Albers; December 10, 1924; Woodbury, New Jersey
- Died: April 19, 2007 (aged 82) Simi Valley, California
- Genres: Jazz, classic pop, barbershop
- Occupation: Singer
- Instruments: Vocals, trumpet, mellophone, flugelhorn
- Years active: 1956–2007
- Formerly of: The Four Freshmen

John Kenneth Albers (December 10, 1924 – April 19, 2007) was an American singer and brass musician who performed with The Four Freshmen from 1956 to 1982.

Albers was born in Woodbury, New Jersey. He served in the U.S. Army during World War II and attended the Philadelphia Conservatory of Music.

Albers sang with The Stuarts Quartet prior to joining The Four Freshmen in 1956. One of Albers' first appearances as a member of The Four Freshmen was a live telecast of The Ray Anthony Show in 1956.

In addition to being a vocalist, Albers played the trumpet, mellophone, and flugelhorn.

Albers died in Simi Valley, California in 2007, at the age of 82.
