= Bob Flanigan (singer) =

- Born: Robert Lee Flanigan; August 22, 1926; Greencastle, Indiana, U.S.
- Died: May 15, 2011 (aged 84) Las Vegas, Nevada, U.S.
- Genres: Jazz, Classic pop, Barbershop
- Years active: 1948–1997

Robert Lee Flanigan (August 22, 1926 – May 15, 2011) was an American tenor vocalist and founding member of The Four Freshmen, a jazz vocal group.

The Four Freshmen originated in early 1948 when brothers Ross and Don Barbour, then at Butler University's Arthur Jordan Conservatory of Music in Indianapolis, Indiana, formed a barbershop quartet called Hal's Harmonizers. Flanigan was a cousin of the Barbours and joined The Harmonizers beginning on September 20, 1948, becoming their lead vocalist. He also played trombone and double bass.

In 1950, The Four Freshmen got a break when band leader Stan Kenton heard the quartet in Dayton, Ohio, and arranged for an audition with his label, Capitol Records, which signed The Four later that year. In 1952, they released their first hit single "It's a Blue World". Further hits included "Mood Indigo" in 1954, "Day by Day" in 1955, and "Graduation Day" in 1956.

Throughout the 1950s and early 1960s, The Four Freshmen released a number of recordings, made film and television appearances, and performed in concert. The group eventually lost their mainstream following with the advent of the British pop bands of the 1960s. The group continued to perform under the management of Flanigan, who maintained rights to The Four Freshmen name and was responsible for the group's changing cast of performers. Flanigan retired as a performer in 1992, but continued his involvement with the group for several more years.

He died of congestive heart failure at his home in Las Vegas, on May 15, 2011, aged 84.
