= 5th Annual Grammy Awards =

1963 US music awards ceremony

- Date: May 15, 1963
- Location: Chicago, Los Angeles and New York City
- Hosted by: Frank Sinatra

Television/radio coverage
- Network: ABC

The 5th Annual Grammy Awards were held on May 15, 1963, at Chicago, Los Angeles and New York City. They recognized accomplishments by musicians for the year 1962. Tony Bennett and Igor Stravinsky each won 3 awards.

== Performers ==
- Henry Mancini - Moon River/Baby Elephant Walk/Peter Gunn television theme
- Tony Bennett - I Left My Heart In San Francisco
- Diahann Carroll
- Peter, Paul, and Mary - If I Had a Hammer
- Connie Francis - What Kind of Fool Am I

== Presenters ==
- Tony Bennett Introduced Henry Mancini
- Bill Dana - Introduced Tony Bennett
- Bob Newhart - Performed a musically themed stand-up before introducing Peter Nero
- Andy Williams - Introduced Henry Mancini
- Richard Rodgers - Introduced Diahann Caroll
- Les Brown - Introduced Peter, Paul, and Mary
- Dean Martin - Introduced Connie Francis
- Frank Sinatra - Presented Bing Crosby with the inaugural Lifetime Achievement Award

== Award winners ==
- Record of the Year
  - Tony Bennett for "I Left My Heart in San Francisco"
  - Sammy Davis Jr. for "What Kind Of Fool Am I"
  - Nat King Cole for "Ramblin' Rose"
  - Ray Charles for "I Can't Stop Loving You"
  - Joe Harnell And His Orchestra for "Fly Me To The Moon Bossa Nova"
  - Stan Getz & Charlie Byrd for "Desafinado"
- Album of the Year (other than classical)
  - Vaughn Meader for The First Family
  - Allan Sherman for My Son, The Folk Singer
  - Ray Charles for Modern Sounds In Country And Western Music, Vol. I
  - Stan Getz & Charlie Byrd for Jazz Samba
  - Tony Bennett for I Left My Heart In San Francisco
- Song of the Year
  - Leslie Bricusse & Anthony Newley (songwriters) for "What Kind of Fool Am I?" performed by Sammy Davis Jr.
  - Richard Rodgers (songwriter) for "The Sweetest Sounds" performed by Peggy Lee
  - Fred Ebb & John Kander (songwriters) for "My Coloring Book" performed by Sandy Stewart
  - George Cory & Douglas Cross (songwriters) for "I Left My Heart In San Francisco" performed by Tony Bennett
  - Lionel Bart (songwriter) for "As Long As He Needs Me" performed by Shirley Bassey & Della Reese
- Best New Artist
  - Robert Goulet
  - Four Seasons
  - Allan Sherman
  - Peter, Paul and Mary
  - Vaughn Meader
  - The New Christy Minstrels

=== Children's ===
- Best Recording for Children
  - Leonard Bernstein (conductor) for Saint-Saëns: Carnival of the Animals/Britten: Young Person's Guide to the Orchestra
  - John Ciardi for You Read To Me, I'll Read To You
  - The Limeliters for Through Children's Eyes
  - David Seville And The Chipmunks for The Chipmunk Songbook
  - Boris Karloff for The Cat Who Walked By Herself
  - Shari Lewis for Shari In Storyland
  - Danny Kaye for Grimm's Fairy Tales

=== Classical ===
- Best Classical Performance - Orchestra
  - Igor Stravinsky (conductor) & the Columbia Symphony Orchestra for Stravinsky: The Firebird Ballet
- Best Classical Performance - Vocal Soloist (with or without orchestra)
  - Leonard Bernstein (conductor), Eileen Farrell & the New York Philharmonic for Götterdämmerung - Brunnhilde's Immolation Scene/Wesendonck Songs
- Best Opera Recording
  - Georg Solti (conductor), Robert Merrill, Leontyne Price, Giorgio Tozzi, Jon Vickers, & the Rome Opera House Orchestra for Verdi: Aida
- Best Classical Performance - Choral (other than opera)
  - Otto Klemperer (conductor), Wilhelm Pitz (choir director) & the Philharmonia Orchestra & Chorus for Bach: St. Matthew Passion
- Best Classical Performance - Instrumental Soloist or Soloists (with orchestra)
  - Igor Stravinsky (conductor), Isaac Stern & the Columbia Symphony Orchestra for Stravinsky: Violin Concerto in D
- Best Classical Performance - Instrumental Soloist or Duo (without orchestra)
  - Vladimir Horowitz for Columbia Records Presents Vladimir Horowitz
- Best Classical Performance - Chamber Music
  - Jascha Heifetz, Gregor Piatigorsky & William Primrose for The Heifetz-Piatigorsky Concerts With Primrose, Pennario and Guests
- Best Contemporary Composition
  - Igor Stravinsky (composer and conductor) for Stravinsky: The Flood
- Album of the Year - Classical
  - Vladimir Horowitz for Columbia Records Presents Vladimir Horowitz

=== Composing and arranging ===
- Best Instrumental Theme
  - Bobby Scott & Ric Marlowe (composers) for "A Taste of Honey"
  - Elmer Bernstein & Mack David (composers) for "Walk On The Wild Side" performed by Elmer Bernstein
  - Dave Rose (composer) for The Stripper performed by Dave Rose
  - Acker Bilk (composer) for "Stranger On The Shore" performed by Acker Bilk
  - Nelson Riddle (composer) for Route 66 Theme performed by Nelson Riddle
  - Henry Mancini (composer) for "Baby Elephant Walk" performed by Henry Mancini
- Best Instrumental Arrangement
  - Henry Mancini (arranger) for "Baby Elephant Walk"
  - Dave Rose (arranger) for The Stripper performed by Dave Rose
  - Robert Farnon (arranger) for Sensuous Strings Of Robert Farnon performed by Robert Farnon And His Orchestra
  - Nelson Riddle (arranger) for Route 66 Theme performed by Nelson Riddle And His Orchestra
  - Quincy Jones (arranger) for Quintessence performed by Quincy Jones
  - Eddie Sauter (arranger) for "Focus" performed by Stan Getz
  - Joe Harnell (arranger) for "Fly Me To The Moon Bossa Nova" performed by Joe Harnell And His Orchestra
- Best Background Arrangement
  - Marty Manning (arranger) for "I Left My Heart in San Francisco" performed by Tony Bennett
  - Marty Paich (arranger) for "What Kind Of Fool Am I" performed by Sammy Davis Jr.
  - Bill Finegan (arranger) for "My Ship" performed by Carol Sloane
  - Antonio Carlos Jobim (arranger) for "Joao Gilberto" performed by Joao Gilberto
  - Marty Paich (arranger) for "I Can't Stop Loving You" performed by Ray Charles
  - Marion Evans (arranger) for "Go Away Little Girl" performed by Steve Lawrence
  - Marty Paich (arranger) for "Born To Lose" performed by Ray Charles

=== Country ===
- Best Country & Western Recording
  - Burl Ives for "Funny Way of Laughin'"
  - Claude King for "Wolverton Mountain"
  - George Jones for "She Thinks I Still Care"
  - Jimmy Dean for "P.T. 109"
  - Johnny Tillotson for "It Keeps Right On A-Hurtin'"
  - Marty Robbins for "Devil Woman"

=== Folk ===
- Best Folk Recording
  - Peter, Paul and Mary for "If I Had a Hammer"
  - Harry Belafonte for "The Midnight Special"
  - Flatt And Scruggs for "The Ballad Of Jed Clampett"
  - The Kingston Trio for Something Special
  - The New Christy Minstrels for Presenting The New Christy Minstrels
  - Joan Baez for Joan Baez In Concert
  - Bob Dylan for Bob Dylan

=== Gospel ===
- Best Gospel or Other Religious Recording
  - Mahalia Jackson for Great Songs of Love and Faith
  - Tennessee Ernie Ford for "I Love To Tell The Story"
  - Ralph Carmichael for Hymns At Sunset
  - Alex Bradford, Marion Williams And The Stars Of Faith & Princess Stewart for Back Nativity
  - The Clefs Of Calvary for "Save Me"
  - Marian Anderson for Marian Anderson - He's Got The Whole World In His Hands And 18 Other Spirituals
  - Leopold Stokowski & Norman Luboff Choir for Inspiration - Great Music For Chorus And Orchestra

=== Jazz ===
- Best Jazz Performance - Soloist Or Small Group (Instrumental)
  - Stan Getz for "Desafinado"
  - Oscar Peterson for West Side Story
  - Laurindo Almeida for Viva Bossa Nova!
  - Bill Evans & Jim Hall for Undercurrent
  - Charlie Mingus Tijauna Moods
  - George Shearing Quintet for Nat King Cole Sings, George Shearing Plays
  - Eddie Cano for A Taste Of Honey
- Best Jazz Performance - Large Group (Instrumental)
  - Stan Kenton for Adventures In Jazz
  - Jimmy Smith for "Walk On The Wild Side"
  - Count Basie for The Legend
  - Miles Davis & Gil Evans for Miles Davis At Carnegie Hall
  - Count Basie Orchestra & Duke Ellington Orchestra for First Time!
  - Dizzy Gillespie for Carnegie Hall Concert
  - Gary McFarland & Stan Getz for Big Band Bossa Nova
- Best Original Jazz Composition
  - Vince Guaraldi (composer) for "Cast Your Fate to the Wind" performed by the Vince Guaraldi Trio
  - Lalo Schifrin (composer) for "Tunisian Fantasy" performed by The Dizzy Gillespie Big Band
  - Charlie Mingus (composer and performer) for "Tijuana Moods"
  - Henry Mancini (composer and performer) for "The Sounds Of Hatari"
  - Quincy Jones (composer and performer) for "Quintessence"
  - Eddie Sauter (composer) for "Focus" performed by Stan Getz
  - Paul Desmond (composer and performer) for "Desmond Blue"

=== Musical show ===
- Best Original Cast Show Album
  - Richard Rodgers (composer) & the original cast (Richard Kiley, Diahann Carroll, Bernice Mass, Noelle Adam, Don Chastain, Mitchell Gregg & Noelle Adam) for No Strings
  - Leslie Bricusse & Anthony Newley (composers) for Stop The World - I Want To Get Off performed by original cast including Anthony Newley & Anna Quale
  - Lionel Bart (composer) for Oliver! performed by original Broadway cast including Clive Revill & David Jones
  - Dudley Moore (composer) for Beyond The Fringe performed by Dudley Moore, Alan Bennett, Peter Cook & Jonathan Miller
  - Stephen Sondheim (composer) for A Funny Thing Happened On The Way To The Forum performed by original Broadway cast including Zero Mostel & Jack Gilford

=== Packaging and notes ===
- Best Album Cover - Classical
  - Marvin Schwartz (art director) for The Intimate Bach performed by Laurindo Almeida, Virginia Majewski & Vincent DeRosa
  - Marvin Schwartz (art director) for Wagner: Prelude And Love Death/R. Strauss: Death And Transfiguration conducted by Erich Leinsdorf
  - Marvin Schwartz (art director) for Otto Klemperer Conducts (Weill: Three Penny Opera Suite And Others) conducted by Otto Klemperer
  - Marvin Schwartz (art director) for Faure: Requiem conducted by Roger Wagner
  - Marvin Schwartz (art director) for Beethoven: Fidelio conducted by Otto Klemperer
  - Jim Silke (art director) for Bartók: The Miraculous Mandarin/ Shostakovich: The Age Of Gold conducted by Robert Irving
- Best Album Cover - Other Than Classical
  - Robert M. Jones (art director) for Lena...Lovely and Alive performed by Lena Horne
  - Jim Silke (art director) for The Great Years performed by Frank Sinatra
  - Bill Longcore (art director) for The First Family performed by Vaughn Meader & other artists
  - Loring Eutemey (art director) for The Comedy performed by Modern Jazz Quartet
  - Ed Thrasher (art director) for Potpourri Par Piaf performed by Édith Piaf
  - Ken Kim (art director) for My Son, The Folk Singer performed by Allan Sherman
  - Loring Eutemey (art director) for Lonely Woman performed by Modern Jazz Quartet
  - John Murello (art director) for Jazz Samba performed by Stan Getz

=== Pop ===
- Best Solo Vocal Performance, Female
  - Ella Fitzgerald for Ella Swings Brightly with Nelson
  - Pat Thomas for "Slightly Out Of Tune (Desafinado)"
  - Diahann Carroll for No Strings
  - Sandy Stewart for "My Coloring Book"
  - Ketty Lester for Love Letters
  - Lena Horne for Lena... Lovely And Alive
  - Peggy Lee for "I'm A Woman"
- Best Solo Vocal Performance, Male
  - Tony Bennett for "I Left My Heart in San Francisco"
  - Sammy Davis Jr. for "What Kind Of Fool Am I"
  - Anthony Newley "What Kind Of Fool Am I"
  - Ray Charles for I Can't Stop Loving You
  - Mel Tormé for Comin' Home Baby
- Best Performance by a Vocal Group
  - Peter, Paul and Mary for "If I Had a Hammer"
  - The Limeliters for Through Children's Eyes
  - The Four Freshman for The Swingers
  - The Hi-Lo's for The Hi-Lo's Happen To Folk Songs
  - The Letterman for "A Song For Young Love"
- Best Performance by a Chorus
  - The New Christy Minstrels for Presenting The New Christy Minstrels
  - Fred Waring & The Pennsylvanians for The Waring Blend
  - Johnny Mann Singers for Great Band With Great Voices Swing The Great Voices Of The Great Band
  - Pete King Orchestra & Chorale for Consider Yourself
  - Norman Luboff Choir for A Choral Spectacular
- Best Performance by an Orchestra - for Dancing
  - Joe Harnell for Fly Me to the Moon and the Bossa Nova Pops
  - Quincy Jones for Big Band Bossa Nova
  - Laurindo Almeida for Viva Bossa Nova!
  - Dave Rose for "The Stripper"
  - Neal Hefti for "Jazz Pops"
  - Stan Getz & Gary McFarland for Big Band Bossa Nova
- Best Performance by an Orchestra or Instrumentalist with Orchestra, Not for Jazz or Dancing
  - Peter Nero for The Colorful Peter Nero
  - Elmer Bernstein for Walk On The Wild Side
  - Acker Bilk for "Stranger On The Shore"
  - Felix Slatkin for Hoedown!
  - Henry Mancini for Hatari!
- Best Rock and Roll Recording
  - Bent Fabric for "Alley Cat"
  - Mary Wells for "You Beat Me To The Punch"
  - The Drifters for "Up On The Roof"
  - Sam Cooke for "Twistin' The Night Away"
  - Neil Sedaka for "Breaking Up Is Hard To Do"
  - Four Seasons for "Big Girls Don't Cry"

=== Production and engineering ===
- Best Engineering Contribution - Other Than Novelty and Other Than Classical
  - Al Schmitt (engineer) for Hatari! performed by Henry Mancini
  - William Hamilton (engineer) for Stereo Spectacular performed by various artists
  - John Kraus (engineer) for "Route 66 Theme" performed by Nelson Riddle
  - Hugh Davies (engineer) for Jonah Jones And Glen Gray performed by Jonah Jones & Glen Gray
  - Bill Putnam (engineer) for I Can't Stop Loving You performed by Ray Charles
  - Al Schmitt (engineer) for Great Band With Great Voices Swing The Great Voices Of The Great Bands performed by Johnny Mann Singers
  - Carson C. Taylor (engineer) Adventures In Jazz performed by Stan Kenton
- Best Engineered Recording - Classical
  - Lewis W. Layton (engineer), Fritz Reiner (conductor) & the Chicago Symphony Orchestra for Strauss: Also Sprach Zarathustra
  - Robert Fine (engineer) for Prokofiev: Concerto No. 3 For Piano/Rachmaninoff Concerto No. 1 For Piano conducted by Kyril Konrashin, piano by Byron Janis
  - William Britten (engineer) for Mahler: Symphony No. 9 In D Minor conducted by Bruno Walter
  - Fred Plaut (engineer) for Mahler: Symphony No. 3 In D Minor conducted by Leonard Bernstein
  - John Culshaw (engineer) for Holst: The Planets conducted by Herbert von Karajan
  - Robert Fine (engineer) for Copland: Billy The Kid/Appalachian Spring conducted by Antal Dorati
  - Fred Plaut (engineer) for Columbia Records Presents VLADIMIR HOROWITZ piano by Vladimir Horowitz
- Best Engineering Contribution - Novelty
  - Robert Fine (engineer) for The Civil War, Vol. I performed by Martin Gabel & Frederick Fennell
  - John Quinn (engineer) for The First Family performed by Vaughan Meader and other artists
  - Al Schmitt (engineer) for The Chipmunk Songbook performed by David Seville
  - Eddie Smith (engineer) for Pepino The Italian Mouse performed by Lou Monte
  - Lowell Frank (engineer) for My Son, The Folk Singer performed by Allan Sherman

=== R&B ===
- Best Rhythm & Blues Recording
  - Ray Charles for "I Can't Stop Loving You"
  - Bobby Darin for "What'd I Say"
  - B. Bumble and the Stingers for "Nut Rocker"
  - Little Eva for "Loco-Motion"
  - Mel Tormé for Comin' Home Baby
  - Sam Cooke for "Bring It On Home To Me"

=== Spoken ===
- Best Documentary or Spoken Word Recording (other than comedy)
  - Charles Laughton for The Story-Teller: A Session With Charles Laughton
  - Laurence Harvey for This Is My Beloved
  - Yehuda Lev for Six Million Accuse
  - Michael Redgrave for Sir Michael Redgrave Reads Chekov Stories
  - Stan Kenton for Mama Sang A Song
  - Leonard Bernstein for First Performance Lincoln Center For The Performing Arts
  - Glenn Gould & Claude Rains for Enoch Arden (Music By R. Strauss/Poem By Alfred Tennyson)
  - Carl Sandburg for Carl Sandburg Reading His Poetry
