= The Apple Dumpling Gang (film) =

1975 film directed by Norman Tokar

- 1975 theatrical poster
- Directed by: Norman Tokar
- Screenplay by: Don Tait
- Based on: The Apple Dumpling Gang by Jack M. Bickham
- Produced by: Bill Anderson
- Starring: Bill Bixby; Susan Clark; Don Knotts; Tim Conway; David Wayne; Slim Pickens; Harry Morgan; John McGiver; Clay O'Brien; Don Knight
- Cinematography: Frank V. Phillips
- Edited by: Ray de Leuw
- Music by: Buddy Baker; Joseph Dubin (orchestration)
- Production company: Walt Disney Productions
- Distributed by: Buena Vista Distribution
- Release date: July 1, 1975
- Running time: 100 minutes
- Country: United States
- Language: English
- Box office: $36,853,000

The Apple Dumpling Gang is a 1975 American comedy-Western film directed by Norman Tokar. It follows a slick gambler named Russell Donovan (Bill Bixby) who is duped into taking care of three orphans who eventually strike gold. It was produced by Walt Disney Productions.

The film is based on the 1971 novel of the same name by Jack M. Bickham. Don Tait wrote the screenplay. The so-called "Apple Dumpling Gang" are named after their favorite American dessert treat, the apple dumpling. The film is also known as being the first to feature the comedy duo of Don Knotts and Tim Conway; they would go on to make five other films together, including 1979's The Apple Dumpling Gang Rides Again.

Buddy Baker composed the music for the film and its sequel, with Joseph Dubin creating the orchestration. The song "The Apple Dumpling Gang", as heard in the opening and closing credits, was written by Shane Tatum and was performed by Randy Sparks and the Back Porch Majority.

== Plot ==
In the Wild West in 1879, a slick gambler named Russell Donovan comes to the town of Quake City en route to open a casino in New Orleans. There, he meets his old associate, John Wintle, who is leaving for San Francisco and asks Donovan to sign for valuables coming in on the next day's stagecoach. Donovan accepts a down payment and promises to pick them up. The next day, he realizes he has been duped into taking care of three little orphans named Bobby, Clovis, and Celia Bradley. The stagecoach driver, Magnolia "Dusty" Clydesdale, explains that Wintle is in fact their relative and legal guardian. With him gone and Donovan promising to care for the "valuables", they are now his wards. The town's sheriff, barber, and justice of the peace, Homer McCoy, tells him that he is legally obligated unless he can have someone else take custody of them. The children cause Donovan much grief by offending all prospective new guardians. They wreak havoc in Quake City while riding in an old mine cart, destroying much private property. The townspeople demand that Donovan pay for the damage, costing him most of his funds for his trip to New Orleans.

Donovan becomes the target of Amos Tucker and Theodore Ogelvie, former members of the Stillwell Gang who were ousted by their former boss, Frank Stillwell, for shooting him in the leg. They continually try to rob Donovan during his stay in town, with unsuccessful results.

The children decide to help Donovan earn money by going to the gold mine that they inherited. They encounter Amos and Theodore at their hideout, who direct the children to the mine after mistaking them for a posse. The children discover a massive gold nugget in the mine, which incentivizes many people to adopt them as it would give them access to the gold. Fearing that these people would not have the children's best interests at heart, Donovan arranges a sham marriage with Dusty so she can keep custody of them while he goes to New Orleans. However, complications arise when Wintle returns. He heard of the nugget and schemes to regain custody of the children. His attorney has a court order demanding their immediate return. McCoy is forced to adhere to his demands.

At the same time, Amos and Theodore attempt to steal the nugget from the local bank and escape to Mexico, but are unsuccessful. McCoy finds them guilty of attempted robbery and sentences them to hang to scare them out of town. They flee to their hideout.

The Stillwell Gang enters town and plans to steal the nugget. Stillwell impersonates a priest to gain more information about the transportation of the nugget from Colonel T.R. Clydesdale, whom he coerces into disclosing the time and place the nugget will be moved. The children, who have grown attached to Donovan and Dusty, go to Amos and Theodore and give them permission to steal the nugget. If it goes missing, Wintle will have no more desire for the children and will return custody. The next day, the Stillwell Gang enters the bank and takes the nugget. Simultaneously, the children help Amos and Theodore rob the bank. They are recognized by Stillwell and almost killed. They are saved when one of the Stillwell Gang members starts a shootout with the lawmen and distracts Stillwell. He decides to leave the nugget and escape, taking Celia as a hostage. Donovan saves her with help from Dusty and they realize their love for each other. Amos and Theodore retreat to the bank's safe to escape from gunfire. Their dynamite is shot by one of the townspeople, obliterating the bank, and the nugget gets blown into many smaller nuggets.

Wintle renounces his guardianship and leaves town. Stillwell's bounty is awarded to Donovan, giving him enough money for his casino in New Orleans. He buys a ranch for himself, Dusty, and the children instead. On their way to the ranch, a reformed Amos and Theodore catch up with the newfound family, asking for work as farmhands, to which Donovan agrees.

== Cast ==
- Bill Bixby as Russell Donovan
- Susan Clark as Magnolia "Dusty" Clydesdale
- Don Knotts as Theodore Ogelvie
- Tim Conway as Amos Tucker
- David Wayne as Colonel T.R. Clydesdale
- Slim Pickens as Frank Stillwell
- Harry Morgan as Homer McCoy
- John McGiver as Leonard Sharpe
- Don Knight as John Wintle
- Clay O'Brien as Bobby Bradley
- Brad Savage as Clovis Bradley
- Stacy Manning as Celia Bradley
- Dennis Fimple as Rudy Hooks
- Pepe Callahan as Clemons
- Iris Adrian as Polly "Poker Polly"
- Fran Ryan as Mrs. Stockley
- Bing Russell as Herm Dally
- James E. Brodhead as "The Mouthpiece"
- Jim Boles as Archie "Easy Archie"
- Olan Soule as Rube Cluck
- Tom Waters as Joe "Rowdy Joe" Dover
- Dawn Little Sky as "Big Foot"
- Joshua Shelley as Phil "Broadway Phil"
- Richard Lee-Sung as Oh So
- Arthur Wong as No So
- Dick Winslow as Sid "Slippery Sid"
- Bill Dunbar as Eddie "Fast Eddie"
- Wally Berns as Charley "Cheating Charley"

== Music ==
The score for the film was written by Buddy Baker, with Joseph Dubin acting as the orchestrator. The theme song, "The Apple Dumpling Gang", was written by Shane Tatum and performed by Randy Sparks and the Back Porch Majority.

== Reception ==
The film was a hit at the box office, earning $13.5 million in theatrical rentals.

Roger Ebert of the Chicago Sun-Times gave the film two-and-a-half stars out of four and wrote that the film was "in a lot of ways ... a throwback to the Disney productions of two or three years ago, a period of overwhelming banality in the studio's history. More recently, Disney has given us some genuinely inventive entertainments, especially Escape to Witch Mountain and Island at the Top of the World. With The Apple Dumpling Gang, we're back to assembly line plots about the adventure of squeaky-clean kids." Gene Siskel of the Chicago Tribune gave the film one star out of four and called it "the latest piece of treacle from the Walt Disney sitcom kitchen. The recipe is well-known: Mix smiling moms and pops with the dash of villains, fold in saccharine children, and beat with slapstick. The resulting cinematic mush is so predictable, it's a wonder that more youngsters don't tell the Disney folks to 'bake off'". Richard Eder of The New York Times called it "as cheerful and indistinguishable as rice pudding". Gary Arnold of The Washington Post called it "the summer's second consecutive stale confection from the Disney organization, whose comedy formulas are solely in need of rejuvenation".

Variety called the film "an engaging gentle-humored comedy melodrama ... Don Tait's screenplay based on the book by Jack M. Bickham would benefit by some sharp editing of certain Knotts-Conway routines but otherwise picture generally is a fast-paced situation caper". Kevin Thomas of the Los Angeles Times called it "a pleasant and funny Disney family comedy" that was "a bit long but amiable enough to get away with overstaying its welcome".

== Home media ==
In 1980, The Apple Dumpling Gang was among the first Disney movies to be released on videocassette. Walt Disney Home Entertainment released The Apple Dumpling Gang on DVD twice: a special-edition release on September 2, 2003, and a 2-movie collection release with its sequel, The Apple Dumpling Gang Rides Again, on February 10, 2008.

The film was released on Blu-ray as a Disney Movie Club exclusive on September 9, 2014.

== Sequel and TV series ==
In 1979, Knotts and Conway reprised their roles in the sequel The Apple Dumpling Gang Rides Again. Bill Bixby, Susan Clark, and the rest of the cast did not appear. Harry Morgan was the only other member of the cast to appear in the sequel, although he plays a different character.

In January 1982, Disney aired Tales of the Apple Dumpling Gang, a television film remake starring John Bennett Perry in the Bixby role, Ed Begley Jr. in the Conway role and Arte Johnson in the Knotts role. The next year saw the premiere of a television series, Gun Shy, with a completely different cast, including Barry Van Dyke in the Bixby role. Six episodes were produced.
