= Transition (The First Edition album) =

Studio album by The First Edition
- Released: September 1971
- Label: Reprise
- Producer: Kenny Rogers, Jimmy Bowen

The First Edition chronology
Tell It All Brother (1970)	Transition (1971)	The Ballad of Calico (1972)

Transition is the seventh album by the group Kenny Rogers & The First Edition.

== Track listing ==
1. "Take My Hand" (Kenny Rogers)
2. "What Am I Gonna Do" (Carole King, Toni Stern)
3. "All God's Lonely Children" (Alex Harvey)
4. "Lay It Down" (Gene Thomas)
5. "Tulsa Turnaround" (Alex Harvey, Larry Collins)
6. "Poem For My Lady" (Mac Davis)
7. "For The Good Times" (Kris Kristofferson)
8. "Good Lady of Toronto" (Peter Gallway)
9. "Two Little Boys" (Alan Braden, Edward Madden, Theodore Morse)
10. "Where Does Rosie Go" (Kim Carnes)

== Personnel ==
- Kenny Rogers - bass, vocals
- Kin Vassy - guitar, vocals
- Terry Williams - guitar, vocals
- Mickey Jones - drums
- Mary Arnold - background vocals
