= Advance to the Rear =

1964 film by George Marshall

- Theatrical release poster
- Directed by: George Marshall
- Screenplay by: Samuel A. Peeples; William Bowers
- Based on: Company of Cowards; 1957 novel by Jack Schaefer, inspired by 1956 article Saturday Evening Post by William Chamberlain
- Produced by: Ted Richmond
- Starring: Glenn Ford; Stella Stevens; Melvyn Douglas; Jim Backus; Joan Blondell
- Cinematography: Milton Krasner
- Edited by: Archie Marshek; Leonard Lieberman
- Music by: Randy Sparks
- Distributed by: Metro-Goldwyn-Mayer
- Release date: June 10, 1964
- Running time: 100 minutes
- Country: United States
- Language: English
- Box office: $1.1 million (US and Canada rentals)

Advance to the Rear is a 1964 American Western comedy film directed by George Marshall and starring Glenn Ford, Stella Stevens, and Melvyn Douglas. Set in the American Civil War, the film is based on the 1957 novel Company of Cowards by Jack Schaefer, whose inspiration was an article by William Chamberlain, published in The Saturday Evening Post in 1956. Chamberlain recounts the apocryphal Civil War stories of "Company Q" (19th century army slang for the sick list), a unit composed of coward soldiers who are given a second chance to prove their bravery. The film had the novel title in pre-production and when released in the United Kingdom. However, the novel had none of the comedic elements of the film, which retained only the basic idea of a unit formed out of men who had been court-martialed for cowardice and sent out west as well as some character names. The story may have been the inspiration for the later ABC-TV sitcom F Troop (1965-1967). Joe Brooks, who appears uncredited as Union trooper Private Joe Bannerman, also starred in F Troop.

== Plot ==
Union Colonel Claude Brackenbury has a cozy arrangement with his Confederate counterpart. They fire a few artillery rounds in each other's general direction at precisely the same time each morning, then go back to contentedly waiting for the war to end.

Captain Jared Heath, however, disturbs the status quo one day by going out and capturing some of the enemy. The Confederates feel obliged to retaliate. Things escalate and a Union military fiasco results. As punishment, Brackenbury and Heath are demoted, placed in charge of all the misfits General Willoughby can find and shipped west, where they can (hopefully) do no further damage.

The rebels are suspicious, so they send a beautiful spy, Martha Lou Williams, to find out their "real" mission. After questioning Easy Jenny, a madam Martha Lou is traveling with, Heath sees through Martha Lou's ruse. But he decides that he is going to marry her eventually, so Heath does his best to keep her out of mischief.

When the unit is sent to escort an important gold shipment, the soldiers are captured by Thin Elk, an Indian chief in league with Confederate agent Hugo Zattig. Zattig's men masquerade as Union soldiers (using uniforms taken from prisoners) and hijack the shipment. Thin Elk, meanwhile, recognizing Brackenbury as a fellow West Point graduate, lets his captives go, although without horses or guns.

Heath takes charge. He and the men steal horses from the Indians, retrieve the gold (and Martha Lou) and capture Zattig's gang.

== Cast ==
- Glenn Ford as Captain/Lieutenant Jared Heath
- Stella Stevens as Martha Lou Williams
- Melvyn Douglas as Colonel/Captain Claude Brackenbury
- Jim Backus as General Willoughby
- Joan Blondell as Easy Jenny
- Andrew Prine as Private Owen Selous
- Jesse Pearson as Corporal Silas Geary
- Alan Hale Jr. as Sergeant Beauregard Davis
- James Griffith as Hugo Zattig
- Whit Bissell as Captain Queeg
- Michael Pate as Thin Elk
- Preston Foster as General Bateman
- Eddie Quillan as Sergeant Smitty
- Britt Ekland as Greta
- Yvonne Craig as Ora (uncredited)
- Joe Brooks as Private Joe Bannerman (uncredited)

== Music ==
The score was composed by Randy Sparks, with songs sung by The New Christy Minstrels and orchestral music arranged and conducted by Hugo Montenegro. The popular song "Today" (while the blossoms still cling to the vine), comes from this film. The song was composed (both words and music) by Randy Sparks, who was a member of The New Christy Minstrels, and it was this vocal group that perhaps had the most commercially successful recording of the song. The song has been recorded by several artists, including John Denver and many assume it to be a centuries-old folk song and not part of a Hollywood soundtrack. The film also features a title song under the name of the original title and UK title of the film "Company of Cowards" and another song called "Riverboat".

== See also ==
- List of American films of 1964
