= Today (The New Christy Minstrels song) =

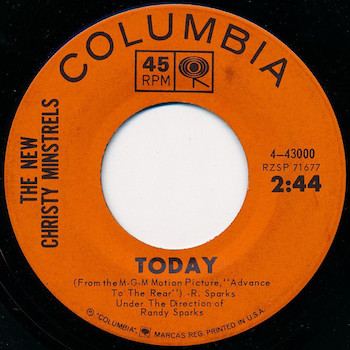

Single by The New Christy Minstrels

from the album Today
- B-side: "Miss Katy Cruel"
- Released: May 1964
- Genre: Folk
- Length: 2:44
- Label: Columbia
- Songwriter: Randy Sparks
- Producer: Randy Sparks

The New Christy Minstrels singles chronology
"Saturday Night" (1962)	"Today" (1964)	"Silly Ol' Summertime" (1964)

"Today" is a 1964 folk song that was a hit for The New Christy Minstrels. Written by the group's founder, Randy Sparks, it was introduced in the American comedy-Western film Advance to the Rear (1964) and released on the album titled Today.

== History ==
Randy Sparks founded the American large-ensemble folk-music group The New Christy Minstrels in 1961, during popular music's folk revival. The band recorded two Top 40 radio hits in 1963, Green, Green and "Saturday Night", but creative tensions within the organization led to Sparks' decision to leave. On the verge of exiting the group, whose name he would sell to its managers, Sparks

...contracted to write the score for a film comedy set during the Civil War titled Advance to the Rear, and as part of that soundtrack he wrote "Today" (perhaps better recognizable from its opening line, "Today, while the blossoms still cling to the vine"), its simple folk style reflecting the 19th-century time period of the film. The temporal tone of the lyric, in turn, may have reflected the film's wartime setting ("Who cares what the morrow may bring?")...

The final song on The New Christy Minstrels' May 1964 Columbia Records album Today, the title track was released as the single Columbia 43000 with the B side "Miss Katy Cruel". The record peaked at No. 17 on the Billboard magazine "Hot 100" chart and No. 4 on the magazine's Adult Contemporary chart.

== Production ==
Vocalists on the original release of "Today" include New Christy Minstrels members Barry McGuire, later to issue the solo hit "Eve of Destruction", and Gene Clark, who would go on to co-found the rock band The Byrds.

== Critical analysis ==
AllMusic reviewer William Ruhlmann called it a "lovely folkish ballad", while AllMusic's Bruce Eder, reviewing the album, found the song "achingly beautiful."

== Covers ==
John Denver, who started his career working for Randy Sparks in 1964, often performed "Today" in concert. One such performance is included on An Evening with John Denver.
