= Grammy Award for Best Performance by a Chorus =

Music award category

The Grammy Award for Best Performance by a Chorus was awarded from 1961 to 1968. In its first year, the award specified that a "chorus" contains seven or more artists. This award was presented alongside the award for Best Performance by a Vocal Group. Before 1961 these awards were combined into the Grammy Award for Best Performance by a Vocal Group or Chorus.

Although in the "pop" field the award did not specify pop music performances. In 1969 and 1970 a pop-specific award was presented for Best Contemporary Performance by a Chorus.

Years reflect the year in which the Grammy Awards were presented, for works released in the previous year.

== Recipients ==
Year^{[I]}	Winner(s)	Work	Nominees	Ref.
1961	Norman Luboff (choir director) (performed by the Norman Luboff Choir)	Songs of the Cowboy	Belafonte Returns to Carnegie Hall – The Belafonte Folk Singers; Deep Night – The Ray Charles Singers; My Favorite Things – The Pete King Chorale; What Wondrous Love – Robert Shaw Chorale	
1962	Johnny Mann Singers (performed by the Johnny Mann Singers & The Si Zentner Orchestra)	Great Band With Great Voices	At Home and Abroad – The Belafonte Folk Singers; Hey! Look Me Over – The Pete King Chorale & Orchestra; This Is Norman Luboff! – The Norman Luboff Choir; A Song at Twilight – Roger Wagner Chorale	
1963	The New Christy Minstrels	Presenting The New Christy Minstrels	"Consider Yourself" – The Pete King Chorale; A Choral Spectacular – The Norman Luboff Choir; Great Band with Great Voices... Swing the Great Voices of the Great Bands – Johnny Mann Singers and the Si Zentner Orchestra; The Waring Blend – Fred Waring & The Pennsylvanians	
1964	The Swingle Singers	Bach's Greatest Hits	"Charade" – Henry Mancini & His Orchestra with Chorus; The Joy of Christmas – Mormon Tabernacle Choir (Richard P. Condie, director; Leonard Bernstein, conducting the New York Philharmonic); Green, Green – The New Christy Minstrels; The Many Moods of Christmas – Robert Shaw Chorale (Robert Shaw, conducting the RCA Orchestra)	
1965	The Swingle Singers	The Swingle Singers Going Baroque	"Love Me with All Your Heart" – The Ray Charles Singers; "Artistry in Voices and Brass" – Stan Kenton Orchestra: Chorus by Pete Rugolo; "Dear Heart" – The Henry Mancini Orchestra & Chorus; "Don't Let the Rain Come Down (Crooked Little Man)" – The Serendipity Singers	
1966	Ward Swingle (choir director) (performed by The Swingle Singers)	Anyone for Mozart?	Jazz Suite on the Mass Texts – Paul Horn and Chorus; Dear Heart and Other Songs about Love – The Orchestra & Chorus of Henry Mancini; Chim Chim Cher-ee and Other Happy Songs – The New Christy Minstrels; On Broadway – Robert Shaw Chorale & Orchestra	
1967	Ray Conniff (choir director) (performed by the Ray Conniff Singers)	"Somewhere My Love (Lara's Theme From Dr. Zhivago)"	Basie Swingin' Voices Singin' – Count Basie with Alan Copeland Singers; Henry Mancini Presents the Academy Award Songs – Henry Mancini, Orchestra & Chorus; "A Man and a Woman" – The Johnny Mann Singers; Rococo Á Go Go – The Swingle Singers (Ward Swingle, director)	
1968	Johnny Mann Singers	"Up, Up and Away"	"Blame It on Me" – The Ray Charles Singers; "Windy" – The Percy Faith Chorus & Orchestra; Wish Me a Rainbow – Living Voices (Ethel Gabriel, producer); Encounter – Swingle Singers with Modern Jazz Quartet	
