= Presenting the New Christy Minstrels =

Studio album by The New Christy Minstrels
- Released: October 1962
- Recorded: April 1962
- Genre: Folk
- Length: 32:01
- Label: Columbia
- Producer: Jim Harbert

The New Christy Minstrels chronology
Presenting the New Christy Minstrels (1962)	The New Christy Minstrels in Person (1963)

Singles from Presenting the New Christy Minstrels
- 1. "This Land Is Your Land" c/w "Don't Cry, Suzanne" Released: 1962

Presenting the New Christy Minstrels, also known as Exciting New Folk Chorus, (Note: The original 1962 LP record (CL 1872/CS 8672) has several titles on the sleeve: The New Christy Minstrels – Exciting New Folk Chorus (front cover), The New Christy Minstrels – Exciting New Folk Singers (sleeve spine), and Presenting The New Christy Minstrels – Exciting New Folk Chorus (back cover).) is the debut studio album by the acoustic American folk music group the New Christy Minstrels. It was recorded in mid-April 1962 and released by Columbia Records in October 1962.

Presenting the New Christy Minstrels won a Grammy Award for Best Performance by a Chorus in 1962 and occupied the Billboard 200 album chart for two years, peaking at number 19. The album included a cover version of Woody Guthrie's "This Land Is Your Land", which entered the Billboard Hot 100 chart in December 1962.

The album, along with the group's next, The New Christy Minstrels in Person, was reissued on a single CD, with two bonus tracks, by Collectors' Choice Music in 2003 under the title Presenting & In Person.

== Background ==
The New Christy Minstrels were created by singer/songwriter Randy Sparks in 1961 by combining three smaller folk groups, the Inn Group trio (John Forsha, Karol Dugan, Jerry Yester), the Fairmount Singers quartet and his own Randy Sparks trio (Sparks, Jackie Miller, Nick Woods). He also included banjo player Billy Cudmore, folk-blues singer Terry Wadsworth, folk singer Dolan Ellis, jazz singer Peggy Connelly and singer/guitarist Art Podell. Sparks was experimenting with the notion of a folk orchestra and wanted to create a folk supergroup.

The 14-piece group worked well together until "literally days" before recording their debut album when the Fairmount Singers were forced to withdraw because of a "poorly scheduled prior engagement." Reduced to 10 members, the ensemble regrouped in mid-April 1962 and recorded Presenting the New Christy Minstrels.

== Music ==
Randy Sparks directed and arranged the music and wrote four of the songs. The 14 tracks on Presenting the New Christy Minstrels are mostly traditional songs or covers of songs by other artists. Much of the material on the album would later become "synonymous with the early-'60s youth-driven folk movement."

== Reception ==
Professional ratings
Review scores
Source	Rating
AllMusic	3/5 stars
Record Mirror	3/5 stars

In a review of Presenting the New Christy Minstrels,AllMusic critic Lindsay Planer was impressed by the ensemble's "rousing rendition" of Woody Guthrie's "This Land Is Your Land" and Terry Wadsworth's "lilting and poignant" song "Don't Cry, Suzanne". Planner called Wadsworth's "Wellinbrook Well" an "underrated classic" and described Randy Sparks's "Whistle" as a "brilliant bout of wordplay." Planner said that the most memorable performances on the album were "That Big Rock Candy Mountain", "Cotton Picker's Song", "Oh! Shenando" and "In the Pines".

Ronnie D. Lankford, Jr., also of AllMusic. wrote in a review of the compilation album Presenting & In Person that while the album "captures the group's youthful, happy sound in all its glory," the presence of songs such as "The Cotton Picker's Song" seemed "ill-chosen." Lankford wrote: "Anyone vaguely familiar with songs associated with Leadbelly will wonder what a group of vibrant middle-class white kids know about picking cotton or sleeping in the pines all night."

== Track listing ==
=== Side one ===
All tracks composed by the New Christy Minstrels, except where noted. All tracks arranged by Randy Sparks.

1. "This Land Is Your Land" (Woody Guthrie) – 2:12
2. "Deep Blue Sea" (traditional) – 3:09
3. "Don't Cry, Suzanne" (Terry Wadsworth) – 2:41
4. "The Cotton Pickers' Song" (Traditional also known as "Pick a Bale of Cotton") – 2:40
5. "The Big Rock Candy Mountain" – 1:20
6. "Oh, Shenandoah" (Randy Sparks) – 2:26
7. "Whistle" (Randy Sparks) – 1:14

=== Side two ===
1. "Railroad Bill" – 2:12
2. "Californio" – 2:08
3. "I Know Where I'm Goin' " (Randy Sparks) – 2:35
4. "Springfield Fair" (Nick Woods, Randy Sparks) – 2:09
5. "In the Pines" (Traditional) – 2:27
6. "Wellingbrook Well" (Terry Wadsworth) – 2:23
7. "Nine Hundred Miles" – 2:25

== Personnel ==
=== Musicians ===
- Randy Sparks – guitar, vocals
- Billy Cudmore – banjo
- Karol Dugan – guitar, vocals
- Dolan Ellis – guitar, vocals
- John Forsha – guitar
- Barry McGuire - guitar, vocals
- Jackie Miller – banjo, vocals
- Art Podell – guitar, vocals
- Larry Ramos – banjo, vocals
- Terry Wadsworth – guitar, vocals
- Nick Woods – guitar
- Jerry Yester – guitar, vocals

=== Sound ===
- Randy Sparks – director, arranger
- Nick Woods – arranger
- Art Podell – arranger ("The Cotton Pickers' Song")
- Jim Harbert – producer

== Chart performance ==
Chart (1962)	Peak position
U.S. Billboard Top LPs	19
