= The Back Porch Majority =

American folk music group

- Origin: United States
- Genres: Folk revival
- Years active: 1963–1977
- Label: Epic
- Past members: Randy Sparks; Marv Allin; Dan Dalton; Michael Clough; Mike Crumm; Jim Glover; Kin Vassy; Karen Brian; Linda Carey; Denny Brooks; Michael Crowley; Lois Fletcher; Ellen Whalen; Paul Potash; Dan Murry; Dan Gladish; Ted Jolly; Nancy Hooper; Marylee Duval; Mike Settle; Susan Hayward

The Back Porch Majority was an American folk music group founded by Randy Sparks in 1963. It was intended to be a rehearsal space for The New Christy Minstrels, another group Sparks had established in 1961, but it ended up becoming successful on its own. The group released six albums, appeared on several TV shows and was chosen to provide entertainment at the White House in 1965.

== History ==
In 1961 singer/guitarist Randy Sparks formed The New Christy Minstrels, a ten-piece folk music group that made over 20 albums and had several hits. In May 1963 Sparks stopped touring with the group to devote his attention to a club he had established in Los Angeles called Ledbetters. While Sparks remained in charge of The New Christy Minstrels, he passed his role of director and arranger of the group's live performances on to singer/guitarist Barry McGuire, who had become the "star" of the group after singing on their hit Green, Green. In protest to being overlooked for the position of director/arranger, singer Dolan Ellis left the group and Sparks replaced him with Gene Clark from a trio called the Surf Riders. To find a new group for the remaining members of the Surf Riders, Jim Glover and Mike Crumm, Sparks created The Back Porch Majority.

Sparks intended The Back Porch Majority to be a performing group similar to, but a little smaller than The New Christy Minstrels, and a group that The New Christy Minstrels could draw new members from. The Back Porch Majority would be a "training ground", or a "minor league farm team" for The New Christy Minstrels. But The Back Porch Majority did better than Sparks expected, and they appeared on Hullabaloo and other musical variety shows. In August 1965 it was selected, along with The Brothers Four, The Bitter End Singers and others, by Life magazine to entertain US President Lyndon B. Johnson and his guests at the White House. The group's success secured it a record deal with Columbia Records subsidiary Epic, which resulted in five albums being released between 1965 and 1967, including a live album recorded at Ledbetters.

Sparks promoted several Back Porch Majority members to The New Christy Minstrels, including Paul Potash, who replaced Clark when he left the Christys, and Mike Settle. The Back Porch Majority also launched the musical careers of some of its members, including singer/guitarist Kin Vassy, who went on to record with Kenny Rogers, Lionel Richie, Dolly Parton and Frank Zappa.

In 1971, Randy Sparks re-formed The Back Porch Majority and toured under the name "Randy Sparks and the Back Porch Majority" through 1979. Sparks and the BPM performed frequently with Burl Ives and Shirley Jones, acting as opening act and back-up band. The group was featured performing the title song to the Disney film, The Apple Dumpling Gang. Members included Mary Lee Duval née Sunseri, Nancy Hooper née Stewart, Dan Gladish, John Erickson, Mark Holly, Dan Murray, Ted Jolly, Ross Sears, and Marv Allin.

Mike Clough, singer and guitarist, born May 17, 1942, died on October 3, 2019, at age 77. Michael Crowley, born Michael Crumm in Oklahoma in 1942, died April 27, 2001, in his home in Lakewood, CO at the age of 58.

== Discography ==
- Live from Ledbetters (1965)
- Meet The Back Porch Majority (1965)
- Riverboat Days (1965)
- That's the Way It's Gonna Be (1966)
- Willy Nilly Wonder of Illusion (1967)
- RS & The BPM, The Initial Album (1971)
- New Country Minstrels (1976)
