= Hacksaw (1971 film) =

1971 Disney television film

- Genre: Western
- Directed by: Larry Lansburgh
- Starring: Tab Hunter
- Composer: Franklyn Marks
- Country of origin: United States
- Original language: English

Production
- Producer: Larry Lansburgh
- Production company: Walt Disney Productions

Original release
- Network: NBC
- Release: September 26 – October 3, 1971

Hacksaw is a 1971 American television Western produced by Walt Disney Productions for The Wonderful World of Disney. Directed and produced by Larry Lansburgh, the film originally aired on NBC in two parts on September 26 and October 3, 1971.

== Cast ==
- Tab Hunter as Tim Andrews
- Victor Millan as Cascade Joe
- Ray Teal as The Rancher
- Russ McCubbin as Dusty Trent
- George Barrows as Olney Curtis
- Noah Beery Jr. as narrator
- Christine Austin as Leona
- John Prendergast as The Stranger
- Susan Bracken as Sue Curtis
- Albert Cooper as the Shopkeeper
- The Westernaires as themselves

== Production ==
Tab Hunter was at a low point in his career when he made the film, being seen as a has-been and having to take out trade ads to get work.

Filming took place in the Canadian Rockies, at the Calgary Stampede, the Radium Hot Springs, the Simpson River, and in Steamboat Springs, Colorado.

Randy Sparks of The New Christy Minstrels came out of retirement to write three songs for the film: "Hacksaw", "Race Song", and "Love Song". Franklyn Marks handled the rest of the music and Glenn H. Randall Sr. was the horse trainer.

== Availability ==
The film is currently available in on Disney+. In a review, Common Sense Media felt that while it's "wholesome", kids might find scenes in the film "a little dull".

== Reception ==
The Register-Herald described it by writing "a cowboy living in the Canadian Rockies captures and attempts to break a wild mountain stallion", with the Daily News adding, "for the big chuck wagon race at the Calgary Stampede".

The Robesonian called it a "two-part stallion drama", and the Delaware County Daily Times referred to it as a “two-part western adventure.”
