= Lefty, the Dingaling Lynx =

1971 Disney television film

- Genre: Adventure
- Directed by: Winston Hibler
- Narrated by: Mayf Nutter
- Composer: Franklyn Marks
- Country of origin: United States
- Original language: English

Production
- Production company: Walt Disney Productions

Original release
- Network: NBC
- Release: November 28 – December 5, 1971

Lefty, the Dingaling Lynx is a 1971 American television film produced by Walt Disney Productions for The Wonderful World of Disney. Directed by Winston Hibbler, it aired on NBC in two parts on November 28 and December 5, 1971.

It was filmed in the coastal mountains of Washington and British Columbia.

The film includes footage of sled dog racing in Cle Elum, Washington.

Animal trainer Lloyd Beebe had to train his own Irish Setter to be the lead sled dog in several months instead of the usual several years it takes.

Franklyn Marks wrote the music.

TV Guide put Lefty on the cover of their July 24, 1971 issue, and The Santa Clarita Valley Signal put Lefty on the cover of their July 20, 1977 issue of TV Signal.

In a review, Letterboxd wrote that "by the time Santa turns up in anticipation of the sledding, we might even be able to start calling this a secret Christmas movie".

== Cast ==
- Mayf Nutter as the Narrator
- James L. Wilson as Santa Claus
- Ron Brown as Joel Barnes
- Harrison Tout as the Supervisor
- Brooks Woolley as George
- Elaine Ayres as Maude
- Dean MeLang as the Snowplow Operator
- James Ponting as the Ski Resort Employee
- Dick Ross as the Dog Derby Driver
- Bill Thomas as the Dog Derby Driver
