= Franklyn Marks =

American composer and arranger (1911–1976)

Franklyn Marks (May 31, 1911, Cleveland, Ohio - July 12, 1976, Sherman Oaks, California) was an American composer and arranger, who worked principally in the idioms of film soundtracks and jazz.

== Biography ==
Early in his career, Marks wrote the song Merry Widow on a Spree for Irving Mills (1937, as Frank Marks), which he also recorded as a pianist with the Millphonics Orchestra. In the same year he played more of his compositions with his own band. In the next few years, he arranged for Charlie Barnet and was involved in the orchestration of the musicals Too Many Girls and Best Foot Forward.

Starting in 1950, Marks wrote compositions for the Stan Kenton orchestra that were oriented towards Latin jazz. His Trajectories were played by Kenton to open his concerts. Kenton also recorded his works Spirals and Evening in Pakistan. Songs by Marks were also recorded by Jerry Lewis, Mel Blanc, Ike Carpenter, Bob Crosby, Laurindo Almeida and Artie Shaw. In 1953 he accompanied Yma Sumac on the piano at the Mocambo-Club in Hollywood.

Concomitantly, Marks worked as a composer and arranger for Hollywood studios, especially for Walt Disney Studios from 1955. Marks had less compositional freedom as a composer for Hollywood, But unlike in the jazz area, he could earn his living there. As a composer, he played for an episode of the Mickey Mouse Club in 1955, from 1956 for 25 episodes of Disneyland, and other Disney television productions. For the cinema, he first orchestrated the music of cartoon, documentary, and feature films of the Disney studios for Paul J. Smith, George Bruns, and Marvin Hamlisch before writing the music for the first film featuring Scrooge McDuck in 1967. He also wrote single film songs, such as "Climb the Mountain" for William Alwyn's soundtrack to Third Man on the Mountain (1959).

== Filmography ==
- 1956 : How to Have an Accident in the Home
- 1956 : The Great Locomotive Chase
- 1956 : Nature's Secrets of Life
- 1957 : Johnny Tremain
- 1957 : Perri
- 1958 : The Light in the Forest
- 1959 : Sleeping Beauty (uncredited)
- 1960 : Pollyanna
- 1961 : 101 Dalmatians
- 1961 : The Parent Trap
- 1961 : Babes in Toyland
- 1961 : The Absent-Minded Professor
- 1962 : Bon Voyage!
- 1963 : Miracle of the White Stallions
- 1963 : The Sword in the Stone
- 1966 : The Ugly Dachshund
- 1967 : Scrooge McDuck and Money
- 1967 : How the West Was Lost
- 1967 : Charlie, the Lonesome Cougar
- 1969 : Guns in the Heather
- 1970 : King of the Grizzlies
- 1971 : Hacksaw
- 1971 : Lefty, the Dingaling Lynx
- 1972 : Justin Morgan Had a Horse
- 1973 : The World's Greatest Athlete
- 1974 : The Castaway Cowboy
