= The New Christy Minstrels =

American large-ensemble folk music group

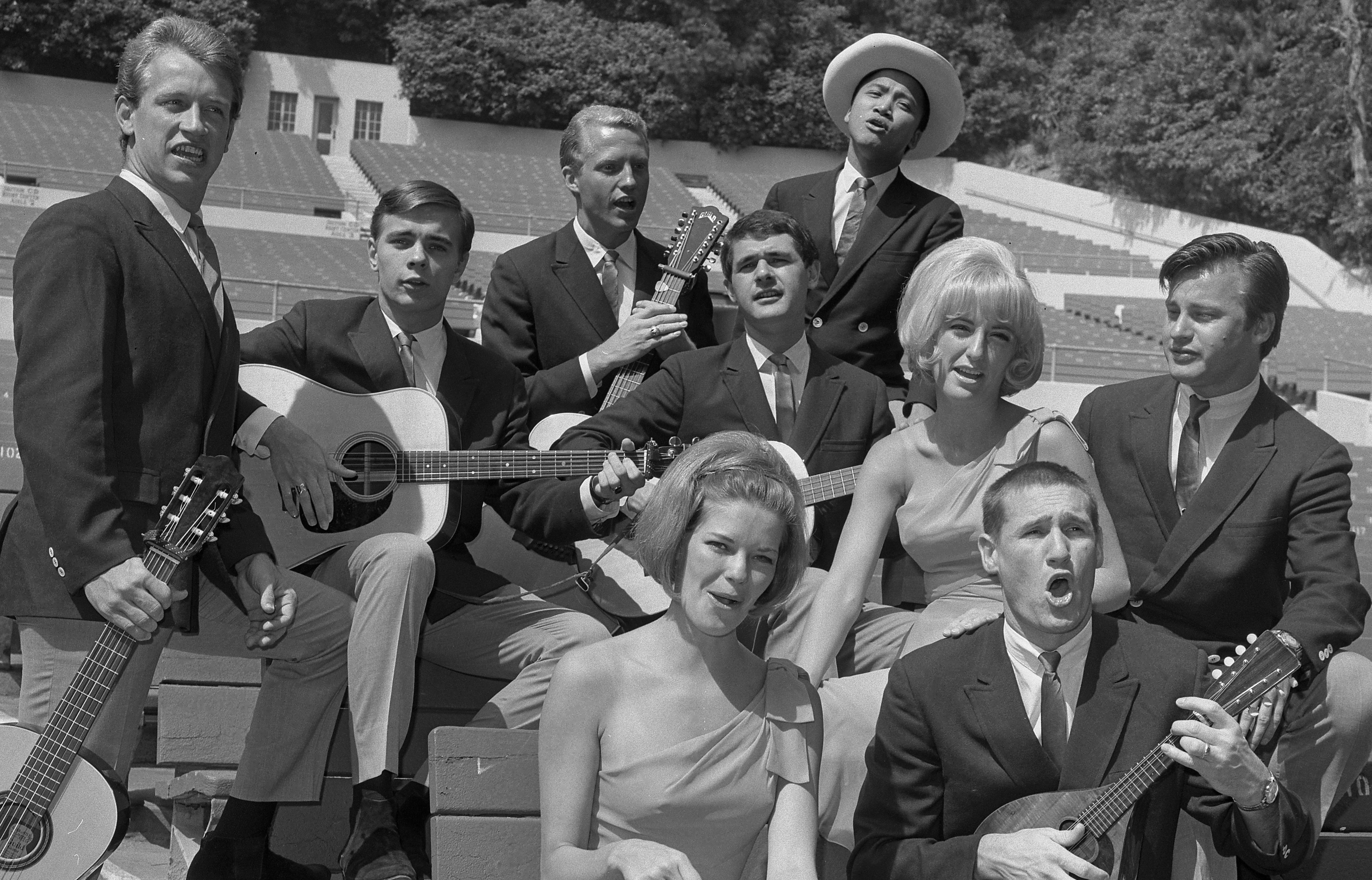
- The New Christy Minstrels in 1965

Background information
- Origin: United States
- Genre: Folk
- Years active: 1961–1971, 1976–present
- Label: Columbia
- Members: Tracy Newman; Becky Jo Benson; Dave Rainwater; Dave Deutschendorf; Greg O'Haver; Tholow Chan; Ed Stockton; Julie Theroux
- Past members: see: Alumni
- Website: newchristyminstrels.com

The New Christy Minstrels is an American large-ensemble folk music group founded by Randy Sparks in 1961. The group has recorded more than 20 albums and scored several hits, including "Green, Green", "Saturday Night", "Today", "Denver" and "This Land Is Your Land". The group's 1962 debut album, Presenting the New Christy Minstrels, won a Grammy Award and remained on the Billboard 200 albums chart for two years.

The group sold millions of records, was in demand at concerts and on television shows and helped launch the musical careers of several musicians, including Kenny Rogers, Gene Clark, Kim Carnes, Larry Ramos and Barry McGuire.

== Founding ==
Randy Sparks had been a solo performer, mixing folk music with pop standards and playing club dates on the West Coast and in Manhattan. Twice the winner of a Navy talent competition, he landed high-profile television appearances and a recording contract with Verve Records. In 1960, at the suggestion of Verve founder Norman Granz, Sparks formed the Randy Sparks Three with his wife, Jackie Miller, and singer/arranger Nick Woods.

Folk music was popular, and choral groups such as the Norman Luboff Choir were incorporating folk classics in their repertoires. Sparks felt that the seemingly perfect sound of such groups lacked the rustic character of actual folk performance. Throughout 1961 and 1962, he created the New Christy Minstrels by combining his trio with the Oregon quartet the Fairmount Singers, the Inn Group (singers John Forsha, Karol Dugan and Jerry Yester), The Travelers 3, and banjo player Billy Cudmore. Large commercial folk groups did not yet exist, and the New Christy Minstrels delivered a robust new sound. Sparks named his group after Christy's Minstrels, a blackface group formed by Philadelphia-born showman Edwin Pearce Christy in 1842 and known for introducing Stephen Foster's compositions. Sparks also saw his group as a means of attracting attention to his own original songs and adaptations of folk classics.

== 1962–1964 ==
The group was meant to be a recording act exclusively, and several members joined with the assumption that their commitment would be for occasional studio work. In April 1962, the group, reduced to ten members after the departure of the Fairmount Singers, recorded their debut album, Presenting the New Christy Minstrels (also known as Exciting New Folk Chorus), for Columbia Records. In 1963, the album won a Grammy Award for Best Performance by a Chorus and remained on the Billboard 200 chart for two years, peaking at number 19. The album included Woody Guthrie's "This Land Is Your Land", which entered the pop-singles charts in December 1962.

Prior to the album's release, Columbia Records West Coast A&R head Irving Townsend demanded as a precondition for the album's release that Sparks convert the group into a performing ensemble that could make live appearances. Also at Townsend's request, Sparks hired business managers George Greif and Sid Garris to help his large, unproven group secure bookings. Some of band's members had no interest in committing full-time to what they saw as a high-risk project, and others had obligations elsewhere. Yester, Dugan, Forsha, Wadsworth and Cudmore all left the group after the recording sessions. Sparks had lost half of his roster when the group was booked as regulars on The Andy Williams Show, a weekly variety show set to debut in the fall of 1962. Among the new members quickly found were the folk duo Barry & Barry (folksingers Barry McGuire and Barry Kane), vocalist Peggy Connelly, singer/banjoist Larry Ramos and tenor Clarence Treat (upright bass and mandolin). The new lineup debuted their act at the Troubadour in Los Angeles in July–August 1962, which included a mix of folk Americana, vaudevillian humor and solos, duos and trios. They were a smash success and garnered rave reviews from both The Hollywood Reporter and Variety.

When The Andy Williams Show debuted in October, the New Christy Minstrels became one of its most popular features. Connelly was replaced by vocalist Gayle Caldwell. In early December, the group appeared at the Cocoanut Grove with comedian George Gobel and then at Carnegie Hall and the Hollywood Bowl with singer/comedian Allan Sherman. Sherman released the performance on the album My Son, the Celebrity in 1963.

The group's second album, The New Christy Minstrels in Person, was released in February 1963. In January 1963, the group recorded The New Christy Minstrels Tell Tall Tales! (Legends and Nonsense), which was released that May. The group's fame had grown considerably, and they received "a raft of enthusiastic reviews." In April 1963, following a successful appearance at the Latin Quarter in New York, the group recorded another studio album, Ramblin'. This album included the song "Green, Green", a McGuire/Sparks composition that became the group's first hit single, peaking at number three on the Adult Contemporary Charts. "Green, Green" sold more than one million copies in 1963 and was awarded gold status.

In May 1963, Sparks stopped touring to focus on developing material and opening a night club in Los Angeles called Ledbetter's, which he intended as a training ground for future group members. By the end of the year, he had formed the Back Porch Majority for this purpose. He passed the role of front man on the concert trail to McGuire. Shortly thereafter, Dolan Ellis left and was replaced by Gene Clark. Clark quit in 1964 and joined Jim McGuinn and David Crosby in the Jet Set, later to become the Byrds. Clark was replaced by Paul Potash, formerly of the folk duo Art and Paul. At the same time, the group's two female singers Jackie Miller and Gayle Caldwell left, citing the group's grueling concert schedule. They were replaced by Karen Gunderson, formerly of the Sherwood Singers, and soprano Ann White. All three began with the Back Porch Majority and were promoted to the New Christy Minstrels in February 1964. Miller and Caldwell later launched a successful career as the pop/folk duo Jackie and Gayle, which had a recording contract with Capitol Records and a spot as semi-regulars on ABC's Shindig! in the fall of 1964.

In 1963, Sparks was contracted to create a film score for Advance to the Rear, featuring Glenn Ford and Stella Stevens. The soundtrack, performed by the New Christy Minstrels, was released in May 1964 as Today and Other Songs from 'Advance to the Rear'. It was the first complete soundtrack to be recorded in the folk music style. The score is notable for the hit standard "Today", which reached No. 4 on the Adult Contemporary Charts and No. 17 on the Billboard Hot 100, The album reached the top ten of the Billboard 200 chart.

In the summer of 1964, the New Christy Minstrels, now nine musicians, were featured in the television series Ford Presents the New Christy Minstrels, a weekly variety show sponsored by the Ford Motor Company and broadcast as a summer replacement for Hazel. Each episode had an outdoor setting, with two filmed at the 1964 New York World's Fair and three in the Los Angeles area: Disneyland, Knott's Berry Farm, and Pacific Ocean Park. Ford Presents the New Christy Minstrels ran from August 6 to September 10, 1964, airing on NBC from 9:30 to 10:00 p.m. ET on Thursdays.

Also in the summer of 1964, Sparks sold his interest in the group to Greif and Garris for $2,500,000. He shifted his focus to Ledbetter's, reviving his solo career, launching the careers of other groups, and writing songs for the movie Hacksaw. Ledbetter's became a showcase for performers who later enjoyed great fame, including John Denver, Carpenters, the Hager Twins, Gary Mule Deer, and Steve Martin. The Back Porch Majority launched a successful career of their own.

== 1965–1969 ==
In January 1965, the New Christy Minstrels, now under the leadership of Greif and Garris, embarked on their first European tour, appearing in London, Copenhagen, Stockholm, Amsterdam, and Italy, where they performed the two winning songs at the Sanremo Music Festival 1965. One of these songs, "Le colline sono in fiore," which featured a romantic duet by Nick Woods and Karen Gunderson, became a No. 1 hit in Italy. Upon the group's return to the U.S., McGuire left to embark on a solo career. Greif and Garris were rooted in the Big Band era and had little interest in the fading folk music genre, so they transitioned the group to more of a variety act with novelty and pop tunes mixed with some comedy. They reached No. 81 on the Billboard Hot 100 in the spring of 1965 with a cover of the Sherman Brothers' "Chim Chim Cher-ee" from the Disney film Mary Poppins. In April 1965, they performed the song on the 37th Academy Awards telecast, where it won the Oscar for Best Original Song. The group would later reach No. 114 in 1969 with a version of another Sherman Brothers title song from a Disney film, "Chitty Chitty Bang Bang".

Turnover in the group's roster began to accelerate through 1965 and at an even faster rate in the years that followed. Potash had left at the same time as did McGuire, and they were replaced by pop/folk singers Bob Buchanan and Michael Whalen. In April 1965, Barry Kane quit and was replaced by Will Teague; in July, Clarence Treat was replaced by Skiles and Henderson, a comedy duo that broadened the group's stage act. In September, Woods was replaced by Rusty Evans. In January 1966, Larry Ramos left and joined the Association; he was replaced by folksinger/songwriter Mike Settle. In late February, Art Podell, Karen Gunderson and Michael Whalen left. Among their replacements were singer/songwriter Michael McGinnis and pop/folk singer Ede Mae Kellogg. In July 1966, Ann White left and was replaced by Kim Carnes. Other new members were folksinger Mark Holly, former Fairmount singer Dave Ellingson, tenor Terry Williams and Texas-born singer Kenny Rogers. In 1967, Williams and Settle left to form a folk/rock group for which they recruited Rogers and another group member, Thelma Camacho, debuting as the First Edition on the Ledbetter's stage. In 1969, the band became Kenny Rogers and the First Edition.

The turnover may have had an effect on the group's sound, which had become quite different from that of The Andy Williams Show period when the group worked with musical director George Wyle on choral arrangements for Williams and his guest stars.

== Later ==
The New Christy Minstrels continued to perform across the country under the management of Greif and Garris, and released several more albums. In 1970, they performed during Super Bowl IV at Tulane Stadium in New Orleans, where they were introduced as "young Americans who demonstrate—with guitars."

In 2009, a Golden Palm Star on the Walk of Stars was dedicated to Sparks and the New Christy Minstrels.

== Alumni ==
(Partial list)

1961

- Hal Ayotte, joined 1961 with The Fairmount Singers
- Billy Cudmore, joined 1961.
- Karol Dugan, joined 1961, from The Inn Group
- Dave Ellingson, joined 1961 with the Fairmount Singers and again in 1966.
- Dolan Ellis, joined 1961 and again in 2006.
- John Forsha, joined 1961. From The Inn Group
- Jackie Miller, joined 1961. Later a member of Jackie and Gayle with Gayle Caldwell.
- Rob Mills, joined 1961 with The Fairmount Singers
- Tracy Newman, joined 1961
- Terry Tillman joined 1961 with The Fairmount Singers
- Terry Wadsworth, joined 1961. Later became an actor under the name Terence Locke.
- Jerry Yester, joined 1961, from The Inn Group

1962

- Gayle Caldwell, joined 1962. Later half of 'Jackie and Gayle'.
- Peggy Connelly, joined 1962
- Barry Kane, joined 1962 and again 1972.
- Barry McGuire, joined 1962
- Art Podell, joined 1962, from Art & Paul
- Larry Ramos, joined 1962
- Clarence Treat, joined 1962

1960s

- Gene Clark, joined 1963
- Karen Gunderson, joined 1964, from The Back Porch Majority
- Paul Potash, joined 1964, from The Back Porch Majority. Later half of the duo Art & Paul.<
- Ann White, joined 1964, from The Back Porch Majority, later a member of The Love Generation.
- Bob Buchanan, joined 1965. Later a member of the International Submarine Band.
- Rusty Evans, joined 1965. From The All Night Singers, later a rock and country performer.
- Pete Henderson, joined 1965. Formed the comedy duo Skiles and Henderson, rejoined the Minstrels in 2010.
- Bill Skiles, joined 1965, later formed the comedy team Skiles and Henderson.
- Will Teague, joined 1965
- Michael P. Whalen, joined 1965. From The Good Time Singers on The Andy Williams Show.
- Kim Carnes, joined 1966
- Mark Holly, joined 1966
- Kyoko Ito, joined 1966. Later a pop/television star in Japan.
- Ede Mae Kellogg, joined 1966.
- Michael McGinnis, joined 1966. Later a successful singer/songwriter.
- Peter-John Morse, joined 1966
- Kenny Rogers, joined 1966, from the Bobby Doyle Three
- Mike Settle, joined 1966
- Terry Williams, joined 1966, later a founding member of Kenny Rogers and the First Edition.
- Keith Barbour, joined 1967
- Moro Buddy Bohn, joined 1967
- Thelma Camacho, joined 1967
- Joe Frank Carollo, joined 1967. Later a member of Hamilton, Joe Frank and Reynolds.
- David Jackson, joined 1967. From The Good Time Singers on The Andy Williams Show, later a folk/country performer.
- Mayf Nutter, joined 1967. Later a country performer.
- Mark Springer, joined 1967
- John E. Tymon II, joined in 1968
- Bruce Bermudez, joined 1968. Later formed the band Catahoula.
- Carol Carmichael, aka Kim Carmichael, joined 1968
- Fats Johnson, joined 1968. Later a folk singer and comedian.
- Rex Kramer, joined 1968.
- Ellen Whalen, joined 1969, from The Back Porch Majority
- Myles Williams, joined 1969
- Bill Zorn, joined 1969. Later a member of The Limeliters and The Kingston Trio.
- Russell Thornberry, joined 196?. Later became a successful recording artist in Canada.

1970s

- Gaylan Taylor, joined 1970. Later with The Limeliters
- Christine Andreas, joined 1971
- John Anthony, joined 1971. Later a band singer for Guy Lombardo and His Royal Canadians.
- Linda Hart, joined 1971
- Terry Meeuwsen, joined 1971
- Nick Woods, joined 1961, from The Randy Sparks Three
- Judy Thompson, joined 1972.
- Amy Castro Payuyo-Stinstrom, joined 1976. Simultaneously with Pesnyary
- Avril Chown, joined 1976
- Nanette Florian, joined 1977
- William Florian, joined 1977

1990s

* Becky Jo Benson, joined 1996

- Eddie Boggs, joined 1998
- Dave Rainwater, joined 1998
- Lori Brandon, joined 1998

2000s

- Chuck Cole, joined 2004
- Rick Hill, joined 2008

2010s

- Dave Deutschendorf, joined 2010
- Jennifer Lind, joined 2010
- Greg O'Haver, joined 2010
- Tholow Chan, joined 2015 (originally part of The Back Porch Majority in the 1960s)
- Ed Stockton, joined 2015
- Sue Harris, joined 2016
- Julie Theroux, joined 2018

== Discography ==
=== Albums ===
- Presenting the New Christy Minstrels (aka Exciting New Folk Chorus) (1962)
- The New Christy Minstrels in Person (1962)
- The New Christy Minstrels Tell Tall Tales! (Legends and Nonsense) (1963)
- Ramblin' Featuring Green, Green (1963)
- Merry Christmas! (1963)
- Today and Other Songs from 'Advance to the Rear' (1964)
- Land of Giants (1964)
- The New Christy Minstrels Sing and Play Cowboys and Indians (1965)
- Chim Chim Cher-ee (1965)
- The New Christy Minstrels (1965, CBS/Sony, Japan)
- The Quiet Sides of the New Christy Minstrels (1965, Columbia Record Club)
- The Wandering Minstrels (1965)
- Amore, Ritorna... (1965, CBS Italy, as 'The Minstrels')
- In Italy...In Italian (1966)
- New Kick! (1966)
- Christmas with the Christies (1966)
- Greatest Hits (1966)
- On Tour Through Motortown (1968)
- Big Hits from Chitty Chitty Bang Bang with Arthur Treacher (1968)
- Barry McGuire and Featuring Members of the New Christy Minstrels (1968, Pickwick, 33 Records)
- The New Christy Minstrels (1970 RCA Japan; not released in the US)
- A Sanremo (1970 Miura Italy; not released in the US)
- You Need Someone to Love (1970, Gregar)
- Greatest Hits (1973, Embassy)
- Keep Japan Beautiful (1975 Warner/Reprise Japan; not released in the US)
- The Great Soap Opera Themes (1976)
- Permanent Wave (1984, Polo. Rare limited release)
- The Very Best of the New Christy Minstrels (1996, Vanguard)
- Today/Ramblin (1997, Collectables, Sony Music Special Projects)
- The Definitive New Christy Minstrels (1998)
- Coat Your Minds with Honey, Hits & Highlights 1962–1968 (1999, Raven Records, Australia)
- Live from Ledbetter's (1999, recorded in 1964)
- Christmas with the New Christy Minstrels: Complete! (2001, Collectables, Sony Music Special Projects)
- The New Christy Minstrels – Presenting & In Person (2003, Collectables, Sony Music Special Projects)
- The New Christy Minstrels – Tell Tall Tales! Legends And Nonsense / Land Of Giants (2003, Collectables, Sony Music Special Projects)
- Merry Christmas, Volume II: 42 Years Later (2005, Minstrelz)
- Stars from the New Christy Minstrels (2007, Ember Records)
- Recycled: What's Old Is New! (2009)
- A Retrospective (1962–1970) (2012, Real Gone Music, Sony Music Commercial Music Group)
- Nice Time to Be Alive (2013)
- Merry Christmas! The Complete Columbia Christmas Recordings 1963–1966 (2013, Real Gone Music)
- Exciting New Folk Chorus / In Person (2017, Jasmine Records, UK)

=== Singles ===
| Year | Single (A-side, B-side) Both sides from same album except where indicated | Chart positions | | | Album |
| Year | Single (A-side, B-side) Both sides from same album except where indicated | US | US AC | CAN CHUM RPM AC | Album |
|---|---|---|---|---|---|
| 1962 | "This Land Is Your Land" b/w "Don't Cry, Suzanne" | 93 | — | — | Exciting New Folk Chorus |
| 1963 | "Denver" b/w "Liza Lee" | 127 | — | — | In Person |
| 1963 | "Green, Green" b/w "The Banjo" (Non-album track) | 14 | 3 | 17 | Ramblin' |
| 1963 | "Saturday Night" b/w "The Wheeler Dealers" | 29 | — | — | Non-album tracks |
| 1964 | "Today" b/w "Miss Katy Cruel" (Non-album track) | 17 | 4 | — | Today |
| 1964 | "Silly Ol' Summertime" b/w "The Far Side of the Hill" (from The Quiet Sides of The New Christy Minstrels) | 92 | — | — | Non-album track |
| 1964 | "This Ol' Riverboat" (New recording; non-album track) b/w "Same Ol' Huckleberry Finn" (Non-album track) | — | — | — | Today |
| 1964 | "Gotta Get A'Goin" b/w "Down the Road I Go" | 111 | — | — | Non-album tracks |
| 1965 | "Chim, Chim, Cheree" b/w "They Gotta Quit Kickin' My Dog Around" (from The New Christy Minstrels Sing and Play Cowboys and Indians) | 81 | 20 | 7 | Chim Chim Cher-ee |
| 1965 | "The River" b/w "Se piangi, se ridi" (from In Italy...In Italian) | — | — | — | Non-album track |
| 1965 | "A Little Bit of Happiness" b/w "Jim 'N I, Him 'N I, Flying in the Gemini" (Non-album track) | — | — | — | Chim Chim Cher-ee |
| 1965 | "Born to Be Free" b/w "Everybody Loves Saturday Night" (from The Wandering Minstrels) | — | — | — | Non-album tracks |
| 1966 | "Dance My Trouble Away" b/w "There But for Fortune" | — | — | — | Non-album tracks |
| 1966 | "The Music of the World a Turnin'" b/w "If I Could Start My Life Again" | — | — | — | Non-album tracks |
| 1966 | "Beautiful Beautiful World" b/w "A Corner in the Sun" (from New Kick!) | — | — | — | Non-album tracks |
| 1966 | "We Need a Little Christmas" b/w "O Holy Night" | — | — | — | Christmas with the Christies |
| 1966 | "It Should Have Been You" b/w "Sleep Comes Easy" | — | — | — | Non-album tracks |
| 1967 | "I'll Coat Your Mind with Honey" b/w "Night and Day" | — | — | — | Non-album tracks |
| 1968 | "Where Did Our Love Go" b/w "Stop in the Name of Love" | — | — | — | On Tour Through Motortown |
| 1968 | "Ballad for Americans" b/w "Gallant Men" | — | — | — | Non-album tracks |
| 1968 | "Alice's Restaurant" b/w "Summertime Love" | — | — | — | Non-album tracks |
| 1968 | "Chitty Chitty Bang Bang" b/w "Me Old Bamboo" | 114 | — | — | Big Hits from "Chitty Chitty Bang Bang" |
| 1969 | "Hey Jude" / "Atlantis" b/w "Run Wild, Run Free" | — | — | — | Non-album tracks |
| 1971 | "You Need Someone to Love (Ta Vie C'est Ton Amour)" b/w "South American Get Away" | — | — | 6 | You Need Someone to Love |
| 1971 | "Brother" b/w "I Still Do" (Non-album track) | — | 36 | — | You Need Someone to Love |
| 1971 | "You Are Always on My Mind" b/w "Where Are You Then" | — | — | — | Non-album tracks |
| 1972 | "Love It Along" b/w "The Age of Not Believing" | — | — | — | Non-album tracks |
| 1972 | "Hallelujah World" b/w "The Ballad of Tom Eagleton" | — | — | — | Non-album tracks |

== In popular culture ==
In A Mighty Wind, Eugene Levy and Christopher Guest's 2003 comedic mockumentary film about a folk-music reunion, the "Main Street Singers" and "New Main Street Singers" were based on the New Christy Minstrels.
