= The Apple Dumpling Gang =

1971 American children's novel by Jack Bickham

- Book cover
- Author: Jack M. Bickham
- Language: English
- Publisher: Doubleday
- Publication date: 1971
- Publication place: United States
- Media type: Print (hardcover and paperback)
- ISBN: 0-385-07637-1

The Apple Dumpling Gang is a 1971 novel by Jack Bickham, about a group of orphaned children during the California gold rush. They encounter a gambler who reluctantly helps them, as well as a pair of hapless robbers who are after the gold the children have found.

In 1975 Disney made a film based on the book.

The name of the gang refers to the American dessert.
