= The Ballad of Calico =

Studio album by Kenny Rogers and the First Edition
- Released: February 1972
- Studios: Glaser Sound (Nashville, Tennessee); Quantum Recording (Torrance, California)
- Label: Reprise
- Producer: Kenny Rogers

Kenny Rogers and the First Edition chronology
Transition (1971)	The Ballad of Calico (1972)	Back Roads (1972)

The Ballad of Calico is the eighth studio album by Kenny Rogers and the First Edition and released as Reprise Records 6476. It reached No. 118 on the albums chart and produced one single, "School Teacher", which reached No. 91. The double album was released in February 1972. The album is a country-rock concept album about the real-life town of Calico, California. The entire double album was written by Michael Murphey and Larry Cansler and the songs tell the stories of individuals who lived in the town.

The various members, not just Rogers, took lead vocals on the different songs, giving the album the sound of it coming from the characters themselves. A 15-page booklet with the album includes pictures of the group in period costumes, pictures of the town, and the lyrics written in long-hand with explanations by Murphey about the origins of the individual songs. With the exception of a 1985 re-issue in Japan, the album was out of print for many years, though several songs from the album have been released on compilation LPs and CDs. As of December 2025, the album can be heard on the streaming service Amazon Music.

== The individual songs ==
=== Side one ===
The album begins with the instrumental "Sunrise Overture" then goes into "Calico Silver" about a man leaving his farm after a drought to a take a job in the silver mines near the town of Calico. "Write Me Down" is about the people who were forgotten over time. "The Way It Used to be" is about day-to-day life in Calico. "Madame De Lil and Diaboilical Bill", the saloon keeper who scares her boyfriend out of town when she finds out he's stealing from her.

=== Side two ===
Side Two begins with "School Teacher", the teacher who faces being an old maid (The teacher, Virginia Merritt, was actually 24 years old at the time and married soon after she left Calico). "Road Agent", about a dead road agent. "Sally Grey's Epitaph" was based almost verbatim on a gravestone in the town cemetery. "Dorsey, the Mail-Carrying Dog", the dog who delivers mail for the disabled postmaster. This song has each member of the group bark like a dog (which is broken by them laughing). The last song suddenly ends with the last phrase "your carrying dog" cut off.

=== Side three ===
Side Three begins with the missing phrase appearing and immediately going into the first song, "Harbor for My Soul". "Calico Saturday Night" is an instrumental, followed by "Trigger Happy Kid" about a young boy who idolizes gunfighters. Side Three closes with "Vachel Carling's Rubilator", a song about a con man who creates a machine which takes over the town.

=== Side four ===
"Empty Handed Compadres" is about prospectors who returned without anything. "One Lonely Room" is about a man who never leaves the town after it becomes a ghost town. "Rockin' Chair Theme" is a brief instrumental leading into the next song, "Old Mojave Highway" about the road itself which crossed the desert (now the pathway of Interstate 15). "Man Came up from Town" is about remains of early man later found in the mountains. The album closes with "Calico Silver (reprise)" in which the silver runs out and the town becomes a ghost town.

== Track listing ==
All lyrics by Michael Murphey; music by Larry Cansler and Michael Murphey

=== Side one ===
1. "Sunrise Overture"
2. "Calico Silver"
3. "Write Me Down (Don't Forget My Name)"
4. "The Way It Used to be"
5. "Madame De Lil and Diabolical Bill"

=== Side two ===
1. "School Teacher"
2. "Road Agent"
3. "Sally Grey's Epitaph"
4. "Dorsey, the Mail-Carrying Dog"

=== Side three ===
1. "Harbor for My Soul"
2. "Calico Saturday Night"
3. "Trigger Happy Kid"
4. "Vachel Carling's Rubilator"

=== Side four ===
1. "Empty Handed Compadres"
2. "One Lonely Room"
3. "Rockin' Chair Theme"
4. "Old Mojave Highway"
5. "Man Came up from Town"
6. "Calico Silver (reprise)"

== Personnel ==
- Dann Rogers, Gloria Vassy, Kenny Rogers, Kin Vassy, Larry Cansler, Mary Arnold, Michael Murphey, Mickey Jones, Terry Williams - vocals
- Terry Williams - lead guitar
- Kin Vassy, Michael Murphey - rhythm guitar
- Kenny Rogers - bass guitar, arrangements
- Larry Cansler - piano, harpsichord, organ, orchestrations, conductor
- Mickey Jones - drums
- John Hartford - fiddle
- Doyle Grisham - pedal steel

Technical

- Claude Hill, Don Sciarrotta - engineer
- Terry Williams - assistant producer
- Bill Matthews - photography
