= Grammy Award for Best Contemporary Performance by a Chorus =

Music award category

The Grammy Award for Best Contemporary Performance by a Chorus was awarded in 1969 (as Best Contemporary Pop Performance, Chorus) and in 1970. In some years, the Grammy Award for Best Pop Performance by a Duo or Group with Vocal also included performances by a chorus.

A similar award for Best Performance by a Chorus was awarded from 1961 to 1968. This was also in the pop field, but did not specify pop music.

Years reflect the year in which the Grammy Awards were presented, for works released in the previous year.

== Recipients ==
Year	Winner(s)	Title	Nominees	Ref.
1969	Alan Copeland and the Alan Copeland Singers	"Mission Impossible/Norwegian Wood Medley"	Percy Faith Chorus & Orchestra for "Angel of the Morning"; Ray Conniff Singers for "Honey"; Ray Charles Singers for "MacArthur Park"; Johnny Mann Singers for "This Guy's in Love with You"	
1970	Percy Faith Orchestra & Chorus	"Love Theme from Romeo and Juliet"	Living Voices for "Angel of the Morning"; Ray Conniff & The Singers for "Jean"; Brooks Arthur Ensemble for "MacArthur Park"; Ray Charles Singers for "Slices of Life"	
