= A Funny Thing Happened on the Way to the Forum (original Broadway cast recording) =

Cast recording by the original Broadway cast
- Released: 1962
- Recorded: 1962
- Genre: Show tunes
- Label: Capitol Records

A Funny Thing Happened on the Way to the Forum is an album containing a recording of the 1962 Broadway musical A Funny Thing Happened on the Way to the Forum made by its original cast. The album was released by Capitol Records in the same year.

== Critical reception ==
Professional ratings
Review scores
| Source | Rating |
|---|---|
| Billboard | (no rating) |

Billboard picked the album for its "Spotlight" section. The magazine's reviewer noted that the album could "get across only some of the wild and uproarious action that [tookj place on stage" because "most of the funniest sequences [were] non-musical" and "[could] not be included" and wrapped up by saying: "LP's success will be strongly hinged to the show's own prospects, which currently seem bright."

== Track listing ==
LP – Capitol Records WAO 1717 (mono), SWAO 1717 (stereo)

All lyrics are written by Stephen Sondheim; all music is composed by Stephen Sondheim.

Side 1
| No. | Title | Length |
|---|---|---|
| 1. | "Overture" |
| 2. | "Comedy Tonight" |
| 3. | "Love, I Hear" |
| 4. | "Free" |
| 5. | "Lovely" |
| 6. | "Pretty Little Picture" |

Side 2
| No. | Title | Length |
|---|---|---|
| 1. | "Everybody Ought to Have a Maid" |
| 2. | "I'm Calm" |
| 3. | "Impossible" |
| 4. | "Bring Me My Bride" |
| 5. | "That Dirty Old Man" |
| 6. | "That'll Show Him" |
| 7. | "Lovely" (Reprise) |
| 8. | "Funeral Sequence" |
| 9. | "Finale" |

== Personnel ==
- Original Broadway cast
- Orchestra and chorus conducted by Hal Hastings

== Awards ==
| Year | Award type | Categories | Results | Ref. |
|---|---|---|---|---|
| 1963 | Grammy Awards | Best Original Cast Show Album | Nominated | |
