= No Strings (original Broadway cast recording) =

Cast recording by the original Broadway cast
- Released: 1962
- Genre: Show tunes
- Label: Capitol Records

No Strings is an album containing a recording of the 1962 Broadway musical No Strings made by its original cast. The album was released by Capitol Records in the same year.

== Critical reception ==
Professional ratings
Review scores
Source	Rating
Billboard	(no rating)
AllMusic	3.5/5 stars

Billboard picked the album for its "Spotlight" section. The magazine's reviewer noted that the musical "[had] received broad acclaim" and that its "delightful" score "should receive equal acclaim at counter and on the air", especially considering "it being backed by an all-out promotion."

In his retrospective review for AllMusic, William Ruhlmann rated the album 3.5 stars out of five.

== Chart performance ==
The album reached number 9 on the mono and number 5 on the stereo half of Billboard's Top LPs chart.

== Track listing ==
LP – Capitol Records O 1695 (mono), SO 1695 (stereo)

All lyrics are written by Richard Rodgers; all music is composed by Richard Rodgers.

Side 1
No.	Title	Artist(s)	Length
1.	"The Sweetest Sounds"	Diahann Carroll and Richard Kiley	4:58
2.	"How Sad"	Richard Kiley	2:32
3.	"Loads of Love"	Diahann Carroll	3:16
4.	"The Man Who Has Everything"	Mitchell Gregg	4:11
5.	"Be My Host"	Richard Kiley, Bernice Massi, Don Chastain, Alvin Epstein and Ann Hodges	2:38
6.	"La La La"	Noelle Adam and Alvin Epstein	2:30
7.	"You Don't Tell Me"	Diahann Carroll	1:49

Side 2
No.	Title	Artist(s)	Length
1.	"Love Makes the World Go"	Polly Rowles and Bernice Massi	2:36
2.	"Nobody Told Me"	Richard Kiley and Diahann Carroll	3:58
3.	"Look No Further"	Richard Kiley and Diahann Carroll	3:13
4.	"Maine"	Richard Kiley and Diahann Carroll	2:59
5.	"An Orthodox Fool"	Diahann Carroll	3:06
6.	"Eager Beaver"	Bernice Massi and Don Chastain	4:22
7.	"No Strings"	Richard Kiley and Diahann Carroll	4:22
8.	"Finale: The Sweetest Sounds"	Richard Kiley and Diahann Carroll	1:28

== Personnel ==
- Original Broadway cast
- Orchestra conducted by Peter Matz

== Charts ==
Chart (1962)	Peak position
US Billboard Top LPs – 150 Best Selling Monaural LPs	9
US Billboard Top LPs – 50 Best Selling Stereo LPs	5

== Awards ==
Year	Award type	Categories	Results	Ref.
1963	Grammy Awards	Best Original Cast Show Album	Won	
