= Leonard Lieberman =

American anthropology professor

Professor Leonard Lieberman
- Born: October 25, 1925
- Died: February 6, 2007 (aged 81)
- Education: University of California, Berkeley
- Occupation: Anthropologist

Leonard Lieberman (October 25, 1925 – February 6, 2007) was an American anthropology professor at the Central Michigan University for forty years.

== Early life and education ==
Lieberman was educated at the University of California, Berkeley (B.A. - 1956; M.A. - 1959) and at Michigan State University (PhD., 1970). He published The Debate over Race (Phylon 39:127–41); with Alice Littlefield and Larry T. Reynolds, Redefining Race: The Potential Demise of a Concept in Physical Anthropology (current anthropology 23:641–55): and, with Larry T. Reynolds, Race: The Deconstruction of a Scientific Concept, in Race and Other Misadventures: Essays in Honor of Ashley Montagu in His Ninetieth Year. (Note: Dix Hills, N.J. General Hall, 1996.)

== Career ==
Lieberman's research focused on human races, the debate over creationism and evolution and intelligent design. Influential contributor to the theory of anthropology teaching when he saw himself as a follower of Montagu’s pioneering ideas about race. He presented 60 papers at scholarly conferences, the last one at the 105th American Anthropological Association (AAA).

Lieberman was a prominent critic of the racial theories of J. Philippe Rushton. One such example is a journal article where Lieberman traced the origins of Rushton's theories showing that Rushton used secondary sources to obtain the size of skulls upon which he based his research about the cranial volume differences of racial groups.

== Bibliography ==
- Race and other misadventures (1996)
