= Jack Bickham =

American novelist (1930–1997)

- Born: Jack Miles Bickham; September 2, 1930; Columbus, Ohio, United States
- Died: July 25, 1997 (aged 66)
- Education: University of Oklahoma
- Occupation: Writer
- Writing career
- Genre: Novel
- Notable work: The Apple Dumpling Gang

Jack Miles Bickham (September 2, 1930 – July 25, 1997) was an American author who wrote 75 published novels, of which two were made into movies, The Apple Dumpling Gang and Baker's Hawk.

== Life ==
Jack Bickham was born September 2, 1930, in Columbus, Ohio. He was an assistant professor at the University of Oklahoma's H.H. Herbert School of Journalism in Norman, Oklahoma, from 1969 to 1972, associate professor from 1972 to 1979, and full professor in 1979. He directed the annual short course on professional writing from 1973 to 1990. Bickham received the rank of David Ross Boyd Professor, the highest honor the university can bestow for teaching excellence. He died at Norman Regional Hospital following a lengthy battle with lymphoma.

== Literary career ==
Jack M. Bickham wrote over 75 published novels, some under just his first and middle name, John Miles, as well as the thirteen books of the Wildcat O'Shea western series under the name Jeff Clinton, six espionage novels under his own name featuring professional tennis player and part-time CIA Agent Brad Smith, and six instructional books on the craft of fiction. Two of his novels were made into motion pictures: The Apple Dumpling Gang, published in 1971 and filmed in 1975, and Baker's Hawk, published in 1974 and filmed in 1976. Two of his books have been reprinted by Reader's Digest Condensed Books and two have been Detective Book Club selections. He was the 1998 winner of the Arrell Gibson Lifetime Achievement Award (S.E. Hinton was the 1997 winner). Bickham was a member of the Oklahoma Journalism Hall of Fame and the Oklahoma Writers Hall of Fame.

== Selected bibliography ==
As Jack M. Bickham

- Gunman's Gamble (1958 ACE Double D-308 with Draw and Die! by Roy Manning)
- Feud Fury (1959 ACE Double D-384 with Mountain Ambush by Louis Trimble)
- Killer's Paradise (1959 ACE Double D-442 with Rider of Rincon by Rod Patterson)
- The Useless Gun (1960 ACE Double D-462 with The Long Fuse by John A. Latham)
- Hangman's Territory (1961 ACE Double D-510 with The Searching Rider by Harry Whittington)
- Gunmen Can't Hide (1961 ACE Double F-120 with Come In Shooting by John Callahan)
- Katie, Kelly and Heck
- Dopey Dan
- Jilly's Canal
- The Apple Dumpling Gang
- Decker's Campaign
- Target: Charity Ross
- The War on Charity Ross
- The Padre Must Die
- Tiebreaker (Brad Smith #1)
- Dropshot (Brad Smith #2)
- Overhead (Brad Smith #3)
- Breakfast at Wimbledon (Brad Smith #4)
- Double Fault (Brad Smith #5)
- The Davis Cup Conspiracy (Brad Smith #6)
- The 38 Most Common Fiction Writing Mistakes (1992, Writer's Digest Books, ISBN 0-89879-821-3)
- Baker's Hawk (1974 Doubleday & Company, ISBN 0-385-05724-5)
- Scene & Structure: How to construct fiction with scene-by-scene flow, logic and readability (1993, Writer's Digest Books, ISBN 0-89879-551-6)
- Writing the Short Story - A Hands-On Program (1994, Writer's Digest Books ISBN 978-0898796704)

As John Miles

- Dally with a Deadly Doll (1961 ACE Double D-489 with Somebody's Walking Over My Grave by Robert Arthur)
