= The Sweetest Sounds (song) =

1962 song written by Richard Rodgers

Song

from the album No Strings
- Published: 1962
- Songwriter: Richard Rodgers

"The Sweetest Sounds" is a song, with words and music by Richard Rodgers, from No Strings, a 1962 musical. The song opens and closes the show for characters Barbara Woodruff and David Jordan, performed by Diahann Carroll and Richard Kiley in the original Broadway theatre production and subsequent cast recording.

== Composition ==
The melodic theme appears to have been inspired by an orchestral figure in the final movement of Johannes Brahms' Piano Concerto No. 2 (Brahms) (measures 64–80).

== In television and film ==
- Judy Garland featured the song on The Judy Garland Show episode that aired November 10, 1963 in a medley performed with Count Basie and his orchestra.
- Barbra Streisand featured the song in the 1973 broadcast Barbra Streisand...And Other Musical Instruments.
- The song is featured in the 1997 adaptation of Rodgers and Hammerstein's Cinderella, performed as a duet by Brandy and Paolo Montalban.
- The song is featured in the third season premiere of Only Murders in the Building.

== Recordings ==
In addition to the respective cast albums and telefilm recordings, the song has been recorded by various artists including:

- Peggy Lee – included in her album Sugar 'n' Spice (1962)
- Perry Como – for his album By Request (1962).
- Sergio Franchi recorded the song for his 1963 RCA Victor Red Seal album Broadway...I Love You.
- Eydie Gormé – Blame It on the Bossa Nova (1963)
- Blossom Dearie - on her album Blossom Dearie Sings Rootin' Songs (1963).
- Ella Fitzgerald's swinging cover can be heard on her 1964 Verve Records release Hello, Dolly!.
- Andy Williams released a version of the song on his 1964 album The Great Songs from "My Fair Lady" and Other Broadway Hits.
- Kathy Kirby – a single release in 1964.
- Nancy Wilson – for her album Broadway – My Way (1964)
- Kate Smith – for her album The Sweetest Sounds (1964)
- Patti Page – in her album Love After Midnight (1964)
- Carmen McRae - from her album Woman Talk (Live At The Village Gate) (1966).
- Sarah Vaughan - from her album Sassy Swings Again (1967).
- Shirley Bassey recorded the song for her 1965 album Shirley Stops the Shows.
- Helen O'Connell recorded the song for her 1963 album An Era Reborn with Helen O'Connell.
- Barbra Streisand – Barbra Streisand... and Other Musical Instruments (1973)
- Rosemary Clooney – for her album Rosemary Clooney Sings Rodgers, Hart & Hammerstein (1990).
- Bobby Darin recorded the song on January 11, 1963. It remained unreleased until June 8, 1999: Ultra-Lounge – Wild, Cool & Swingin'.
- Rebecca Martin - for her album Middlehope (2001)
- Cécile McLorin Salvant - on her album The Window (2018)
