= Kin Vassy =

American singer-songwriter

- Born: Charles Kindred Vassy; August 16, 1943
- Origin: Carrollton, Georgia, United States
- Died: June 23, 1994 (aged 50)
- Genres: Country
- Occupation: Singer-songwriter
- Instrument: Vocals
- Years active: 1963–1994
- Labels: ia, Liberty
- Formerly of: Kenny Rogers and the First Edition

Charles Kindred Vassy (August 16, 1943 – June 23, 1994) was a singer-songwriter, who in addition to his solo recordings also recorded with other artists, most notably Kenny Rogers, Frank Zappa and Elvis Presley.

In the 1960s, Vassy was a member of The Back Porch Majority. He left that group in 1969 and joined the country rock band Kenny Rogers and The First Edition. As a member of the group he recorded a top 30 album — Something's Burning — and one of his own songs "Heed The Call" became a top 40 hit in 1970. He performed lead vocal on the group's 1972 single "School Teacher". In 1973, he sang the "Yipee-Yi-Yo-Ty-Yay's" on the outro of Frank Zappa's single "Montana" from the "Over-Nite Sensation" album.

Vassy left the First Edition in 1972 after The Ballad of Calico album and was replaced by Jimmy Hassell. He went on to work on both a solo career and as a session musician. In 1980, Vassy released two singles for the International Artists (IA) record label: "Do I Ever Cross Your Mind" and "Makes Me Wonder If I Ever Said Goodbye." He moved to the Liberty Records label and released seven singles on it, including Earl Thomas Conley's "When You Were Blue and I Was Green", which reached No. 21 on Hot Country Songs. Vassy continued to work with Rogers on various projects, such as his 1984 album What About Me?. Vassy also composed the song "Kentucky Homemade Christmas" for Rogers, released on Christmas (Liberty Records, 1981). Also in 1984, he performed a song with country-gospel singer Stella Parton, for the Rhinestone soundtrack, which Stella's sister Dolly had starred in.

Vassy died of lung cancer in 1994.

== Discography ==
Year	Single	US Country
1971	"Revelation"	
1972	"Will The Circle Be Unbroken"	
1979	"Do I Ever Cross Your Mind"	85
1980	"Makes Me Wonder If I Ever Said Goodbye"	67
1980	"There's Nobody Like You"	88
1981	"Likin' Him and Lovin' You"	39
1981	"Sneakin' Around"	48
1981	"When You Were Blue and I Was Green"	21
1982	"Cast the First Stone"	78
1982	"Women in Love"	59
1983	"Tryin' to Love Two"	80
