= Peggy Connelly =

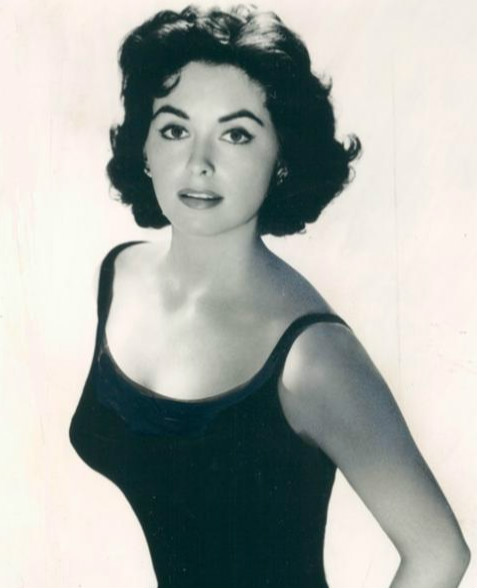
- Peggy Connelly, 1956

Background information
- Born: Peggy Lou Connelly; September 25, 1931
- Died: June 11, 2007 (aged 75)
- Genres: Jazz
- Occupations: Singer, actress
- Label: Bethlehem
- Formerly of: The Jazzberries, The New Christy Minstrels
- Spouse: Dick Martin (m. 1957, divorced)

Peggy Connelly (September 25, 1931 – June 11, 2007) was an American singer and actress.

== Early years ==
Connelly's parents were Mr. and Mrs. George F. Connelly, and she has four siblings. As a teenager, she sang for military personnel in Texas in shows sponsored by the Red Cross and the USO. She also worked as a model for photographers and in fashion shows.

== Career ==
Connelly's singing career began on radio stations in Fort Worth and with local dance bands. In 1956 she recorded an album of standards, Peggy Connelly with Rusell Garcia – That Old Black Magic, for Bethlehem Records, reissued by Fresh Sound on Russell Garcia's Wigville Band. She also recorded two albums with The New Christy Minstrels. She also appeared with backup arranged by Marty Paich on one side of an LP, Peggy Connelly Sings (rec. ca. 1950s), released in 1987 by Nocturne Records.

Connelly appeared in The Girl in the Red Velvet Swing (1955), Houseboat (1958), and the television show Take a Good Look with Ernie Kovacs.

== Personal life ==
Between 1955 and 1957, Connelly was in a relationship with Frank Sinatra. On November 13, 1957, in Cleveland, Ohio, Connelly married comedian Dick Martin. They divorced in the early 1960s.

== Sources ==
- AllMusic Guide: New Christy Minstrels
- Bethlehem Records Discography: 1956
- Peggy Connelly at IMDb
- Obituary: Peggy Lou Connelly Star-Telegram. July 1, 2007. Accessed July 9, 2007.
