= Randy Sparks =

American singer-songwriter (1933–2024)

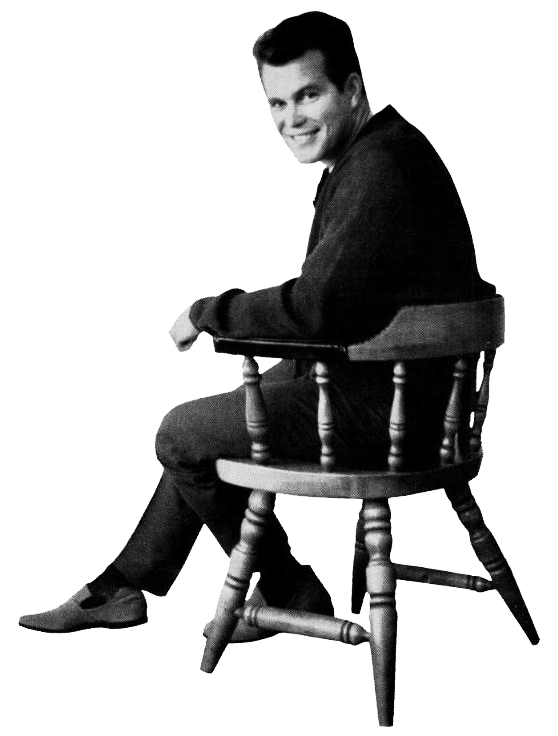
- Sparks in 1964

Background information
- Born: Lloyd Arrington Sparks; July 29, 1933; Leavenworth, Kansas, U.S.
- Died: February 11, 2024 (aged 90) San Diego, California, U.S.
- Genre: Folk
- Occupations: Musician, singer-songwriter
- Instruments: Guitar, banjo
- Years active: 1958–2024
- Labels: Verve, Columbia
- Formerly of: The New Christy Minstrels, The Back Porch Majority
- Website: newchristyminstrels.com

Lloyd Arrington Sparks (July 29, 1933 – February 11, 2024), known professionally as Randy Sparks, was an American musician, singer-songwriter, and founder of The New Christy Minstrels and The Back Porch Majority.

== Biography ==
Sparks was born on July 29, 1933, in Leavenworth, Kansas, and grew up in Oakland, California. He attended the University of California at Berkeley. His first musical engagement was at The Purple Onion in San Francisco. In the late 1950s during his solo career, he released two albums on the Verve label, a self-titled album in 1958 and Walkin' the Low Road in 1959. The title single from the album reached the Cashbox magazine top 60.

In 1960, he formed a trio called "The Randy Sparks Three", and they released an album of the same name. He composed "Today"; this was a hit for the New Christy Minstrels from their 1964 album of the same title for Columbia Records (CL 2159/CS 8959). He co-composed "Green, Green" with Barry McGuire for the 1963 album Ramblin (CL 2055/CS 8855). Sparks starred in the 1960 film drama The Big Night.

Sparks also wrote "Saturday Night in Toledo, Ohio", which was recorded and made famous by John Denver.

Sparks composed the musical score for the 1964 movie Advance to the Rear, a Civil War spoof. The love song "Today" ("while the blossoms still cling to the vine") was part of that score.

Sparks sang the theme song over the opening credits of the 1958 film Thunder Road. In an email to DJ Allyn in 2009, he said that Robert Mitchum had asked him to play the kid brother in the movie and to compose a theme song for it, but in the theatrical release, Sparks sang a different theme song, which was co-written by Mitchum.

In 1971 Sparks wrote three songs for the film Hacksaw. In 1975, Sparks provided the new vocal tracks for the characters Ernest the "Dude" and Zeke in the Country Bear Jamboree.

In 2009, a Golden Palm Star on the Palm Springs, California, Walk of Stars was dedicated to the New Christy Minstrels and him.

== Personal life ==
Sparks was married to Jackie Miller from 1958 to 1962. After their divorce, he was married to actress Diane Jergens from 1962 until her death in 2018. The couple had four children, Kevin Ray (born 1963), twins Cameron Michael and Melinda Anne (born 1966), and Amanda Hamilton (born 1970).

Sparks died in San Diego on February 11, 2024, at the age of 90.
