= Pete King (composer) =

American composer and arranger (1914–1982)

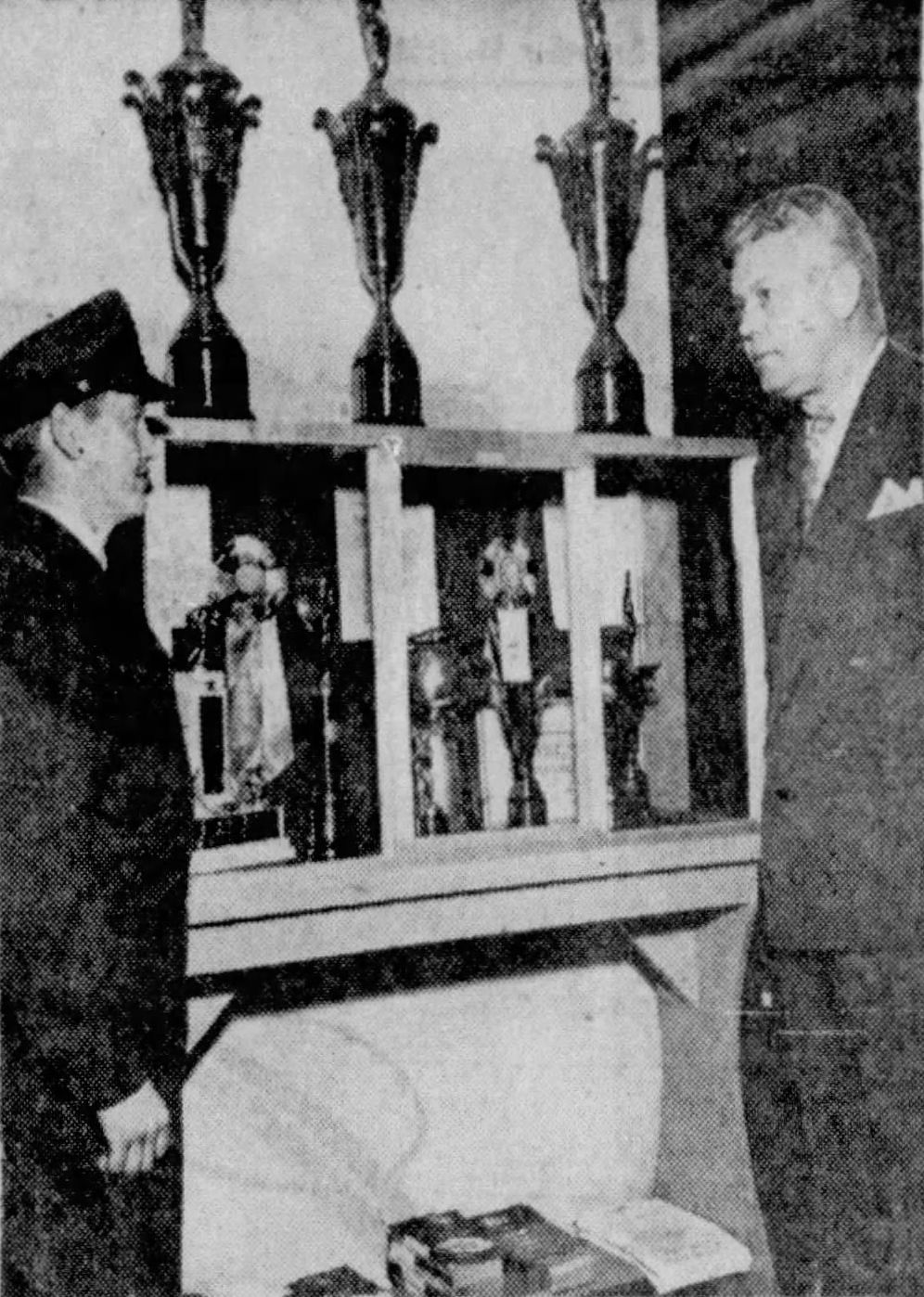
Pete King (right) speaking to Capt. Eugene C. Harman at the Van Nuys Air National Guard Headquarters in December 1951.

C. Dudley "Pete" King (August 8, 1914 – September 21, 1982) was an American music composer and arranger of easy listening music and film soundtracks.

He was born in Ohio and studied music at the Cincinnati Conservatory and the University of Michigan. He was elected president of the National Academy of Recording Arts and Sciences in 1967.

King conducted orchestras for a variety of Hollywood films including adapting the works of Edvard Grieg for The Pied Piper of Hamelin and two comedies The Family Jewels and The Last of the Secret Agents. King's arrangements and cues were heard often in the American television series Happy Days and The Brady Bunch. With his own Pete King Chorale he recorded, among other songs, "Hey, Look Me Over".

He was buried at the Forest Lawn, Hollywood Hills Cemetery in Los Angeles.
