= Green, Green (song) =

1963 single by the New Christy Minstrels

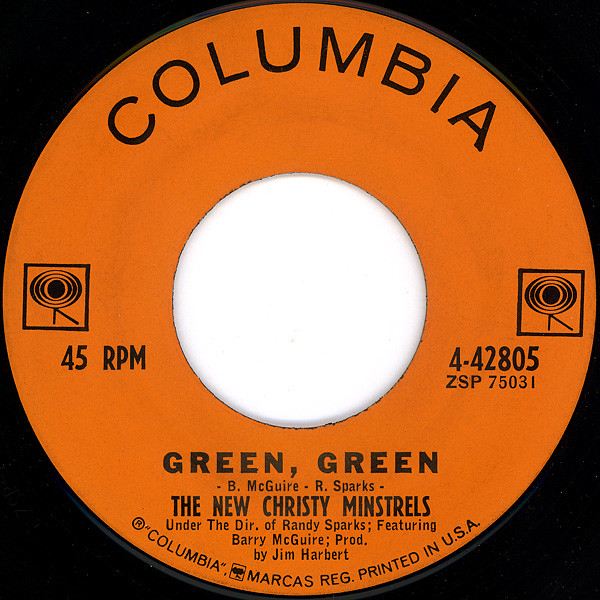

Single by the New Christy Minstrels

from the album Ramblin' featuring 'Green, Green'
- B-side: "The Banjo"
- Released: June 4, 1963
- Genre: Folk
- Length: 2:10
- Label: Columbia
- Songwriters: Barry McGuire, Randy Sparks
- Producer: Jim Harbert

The New Christy Minstrels singles chronology
"Denver" (1963)	"Green, Green" (1963)	"Saturday Night" (1963)

"Green, Green" is a hit single released by American folk music group The New Christy Minstrels on June 4, 1963. It was composed and written by group members Barry McGuire and Randy Sparks and became the group's first hit. Since then, it has been covered by many singers and artists from all over the world, but especially in Japan.

== Charts ==
Chart (1963)	Peak position
Canada CHUM Chart	17
U.S. Hot 100	14
U.S. Easy Listening	3

"Green, Green" sold over one million copies in 1963, and was awarded a gold disc. It was nominated in 1964 for the Grammy Award for Best Folk Recording and Best Performance By A Chorus.

== Variants, covers and sampling ==
The New Christy Minstrels also recorded the song in German (named "Grün, grün ist Tennessee") and Spanish ("Verde, Verde").

Green, Green has been covered by artists including:

- Eddy Arnold and the Needmore Creek Singers – Green Green
- Brian Hyland – Green Green
- Glen Campbell – Green Green
- Drafi Deutscher – Grün, grün ist Tennessee
- Cliff Richard – Du, Du Gefällst Mir So
- Dalida – Ding Ding
- Ann-Louise Hanson – Ding Ding
- Rangers – Vim Vim
- Georg Dolivo – Maantie
- Bruce Low – Grün, Drün
- Bjørn Tidmand – Blå, Blå
- Johnny Rivers – Green Green

=== Japanese version ===
Poet and children's literature author Hikaru Kataoka took notice of the song in the 1960s. At this time he was working for the Japanese public broadcaster NHK, where he was in charge of production, song writing and translation. He wrote new Japanese lyrics for "Green, Green", and in May 1967, it was broadcast on NHK during the children's programming of Minna no Uta (Songs for Everyone) sung by Suginami Junior Chorus and arranged by Akihiro Komori. Since then the lyrics have become very popular in Japan.

The lyrics have been published in several Japanese music textbooks.
