= Esquivel =

- Pronunciation: Spanish: [eskiˈβel]
- Language: Spanish

Origin
- Language: Basque
- Meaning: 'behind the lime trees'
- Region of origin: Basque Country

Other names
- Variant forms: Esquibel, Ezkibel, Ezquivelle, Ezquibel, Escivel, Escibel, Esquivelle, Esquível

Esquivel is a surname of Basque origin as well as a place name.

== Origin ==
The last name Esquivel/Esquibel has its origins in the village of Esquivel, located in the ayuntamiento of Mendoza, Álava, in Euskadi.

=== Meaning ===
Usually surnames were originated in the Basque Country as name of houses, being families known by the name of the house they inhabited once. Esquivel was originally spelled Ezkibel and evolved from the Basque words Ezki, which means lime tree, and Gibel, which means behind. Therefore, Esquivel means the house behind the lime trees.

== People ==
=== Argentina ===
- Adolfo Pérez Esquivel, Nobel Peace Prize recipient
- George Esquivel, shoe designer and craftsman
- Laura Natalia Esquivel, teen actress and singer

=== Costa Rica ===
- Aniceto Esquivel Sáenz, former President of Costa Rica
- Ascensión Esquivel Ibarra, Nicaraguan-born former of Costa Rica
- Juan Bautista Esquivel, footballer
- Natalia Esquivel, composer and author

=== Mexico ===
- Carlos Esquivel, footballer
- Juan García Esquivel, band leader, pianist and composer
- Laura Esquivel, author
- Yasmín Esquivel Mossa (born 1963), minister of the Supreme Court of Justice

=== Spain ===
- Emilio Morote Esquivel, novelist
- Juan de Esquivel, explorer, first governor of Jamaica
- Juan Esquivel Barahona, composer
- Miguel de Álava y Esquivel, General and statesman

=== Other ===
- Celso Esquivel, Paraguayan footballer
- Julia Esquivel, Guatemalan writer and human rights activist
- Manuel Esquivel, former Belizean Prime Minister
- Rafael Esquivel, former Venezuelan Football Federation directive
