= List of Indiana University of Pennsylvania people =

The following is a list of notable individuals associated with the Indiana University of Pennsylvania (IUP), and includes alumni, presidents, faculty, and staff.

== Presidents ==
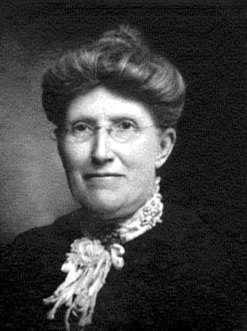
Jane E. Leonard, c. 1915

IUP's executive has changed names and roles with the evolving institution. The original title for the chief executive was "principal", while "president" was reserved for John Sutton as presiding officer of Indiana Normal School's Board of Trustees.

=== President, Indiana University of Pennsylvania (1965–present) ===
- Michael A. Driscoll, beginning July 1, 2012
- David J. Werner, 2010–2012 (interim)
- Tony Atwater, 2005–2010
- Diane Reinhard, 2004 (interim)
- Mark J. Staszkiewicz, 2004 (acting)
- Derek Hodgson, 2003–2004
- Lawrence K. Pettit, 1992–2003
- Charles Fuget, 1991–1992 (interim)
- John D. Welty, 1984 (interim), 1984–1991
- John E. Worthen, 1979–1984
- Bernard J. Ganley, 1979 (interim)
- Robert C. Wilburn, 1975–1979
- William W. Hassler, 1969–1975

=== President, Indiana State College (1959–1965) ===
- John Davis, 1962 (acting)

=== President, Indiana State Teachers College (1927–1959) ===
- Willis E. Pratt, 1948–1968
- Ralph E. Heiges, 1948 (acting)
- Joseph M. Uhler, 1942–1947
- Leroy A. King, 1939–1942
- Samuel Fausold, 1937–1939
- Charles R. Foster, 1927–1936

=== Principal, Indiana Normal School (1875–1927) ===
- John A. H. Keith, 1917–1927
- James E. Ament, 1907–1917
- David Jewtt Waller, 1893–1907
- Charles Deane, 1891–1893
- Z. X. Snyder, 1888–1891
- Leonard H. Durling, 1881–1888
- John H. French, 1878–1881
- David M. Sensenig, 1876–1878
- Edmund B. Fairfield, 1875–1876

== Notable faculty ==
=== Professors ===
- Gawdat Bahgat - political science (1995–2009)
- Eileen Glisan - Spanish, president of the American Council on the Teaching of Foreign Languages for 2010
- Jack Stamp - composer

=== Coaches ===
- Curt Cignetti - head football coach since 2011; son of Frank Cignetti, Sr.; former assistant coach at the University of Alabama
- Frank Cignetti Sr. - head football coach 1986–2005; the university's winningest coach, leading the football team to two NCAA Division II Football Championship games
- Chuck Klausing - head football coach 1964–1969; College Football Hall of Fame; 19th winningest coach in National Collegiate Athletic Association (NCAA) football history
- Joe Lombardi - head men's basketball coach since 2006; former assistant coach at University of Pittsburgh
- Lou Tepper - head football coach 2006–2011; former head coach at University of Illinois Urbana-Champaign and PennWest Edinboro

=== Other ===
- Job of Chicago - archbishop of the Orthodox Church in America Diocese of the Midwest, former director of the university's Orthodox Christian Fellowship

== Notable alumni ==
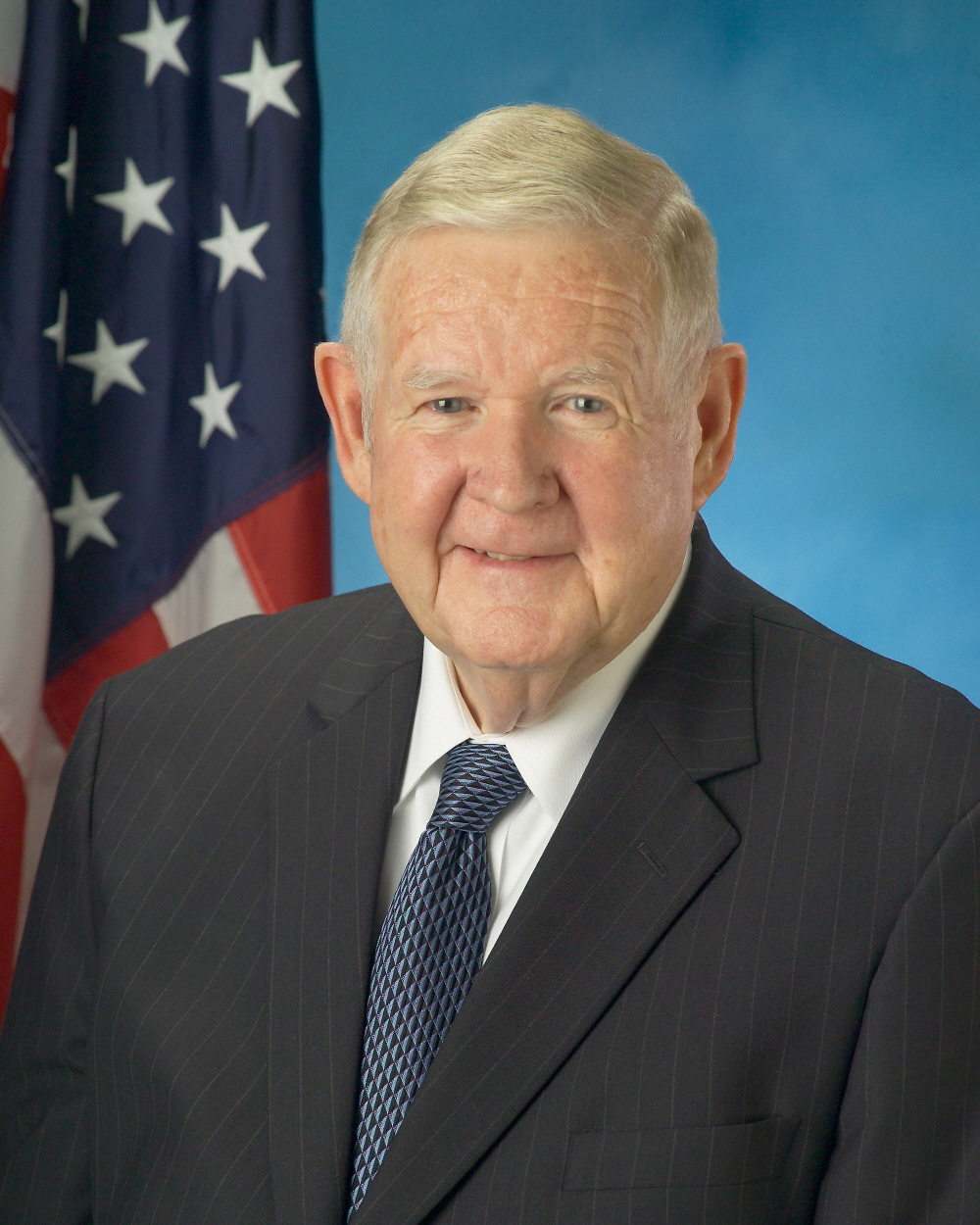
John Murtha served the 12th District of Pennsylvania in the United States House of Representatives from 1974 until his death in 2010.

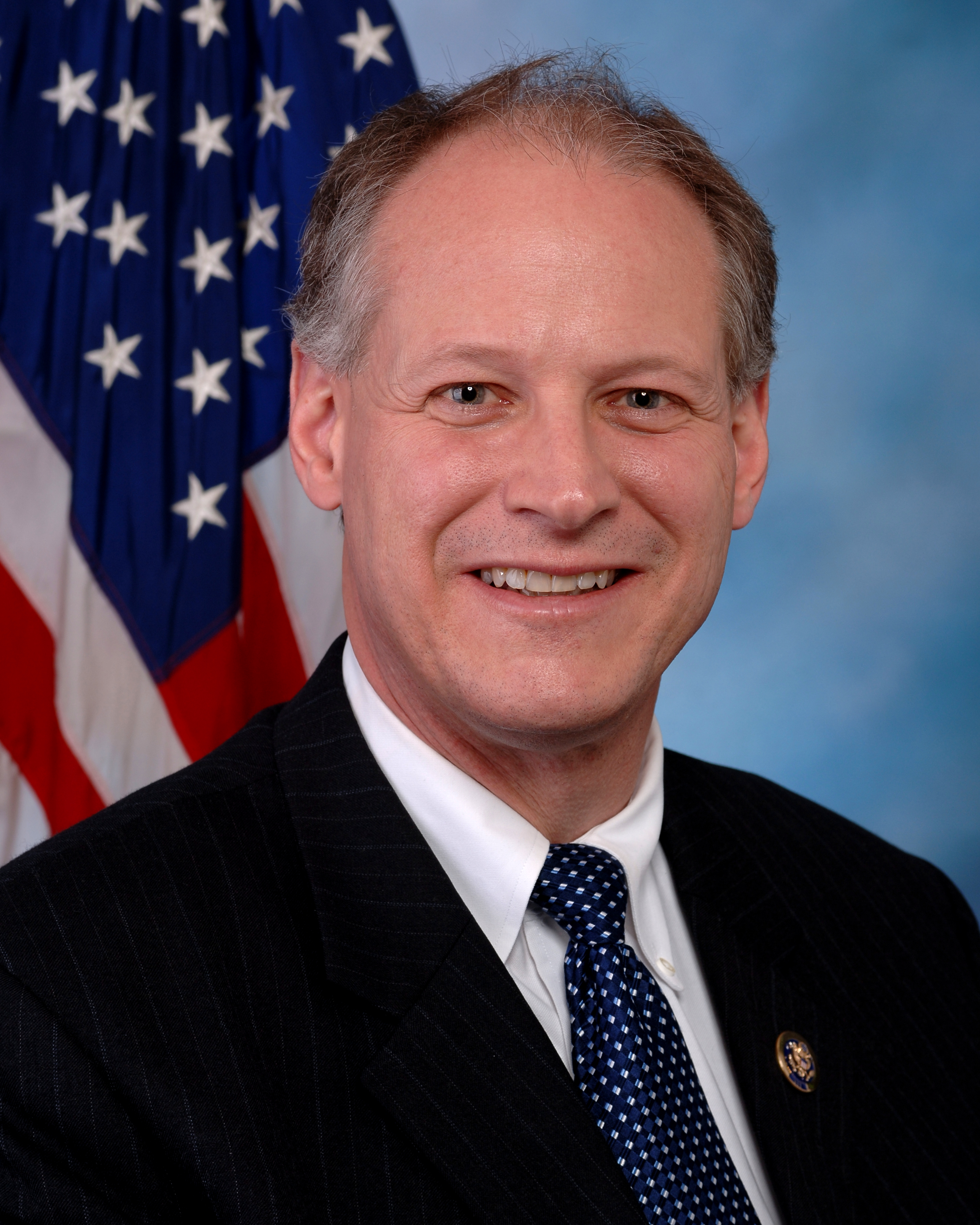
Mark Critz worked for Murtha and won a 2010 special election to replace him after his death.

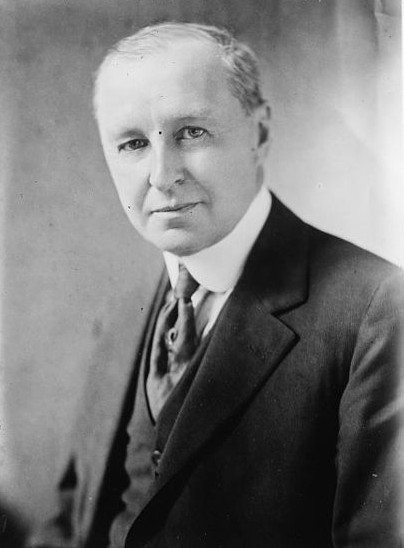
John Stuchell Fisher, governor of Pennsylvania 1927–1931

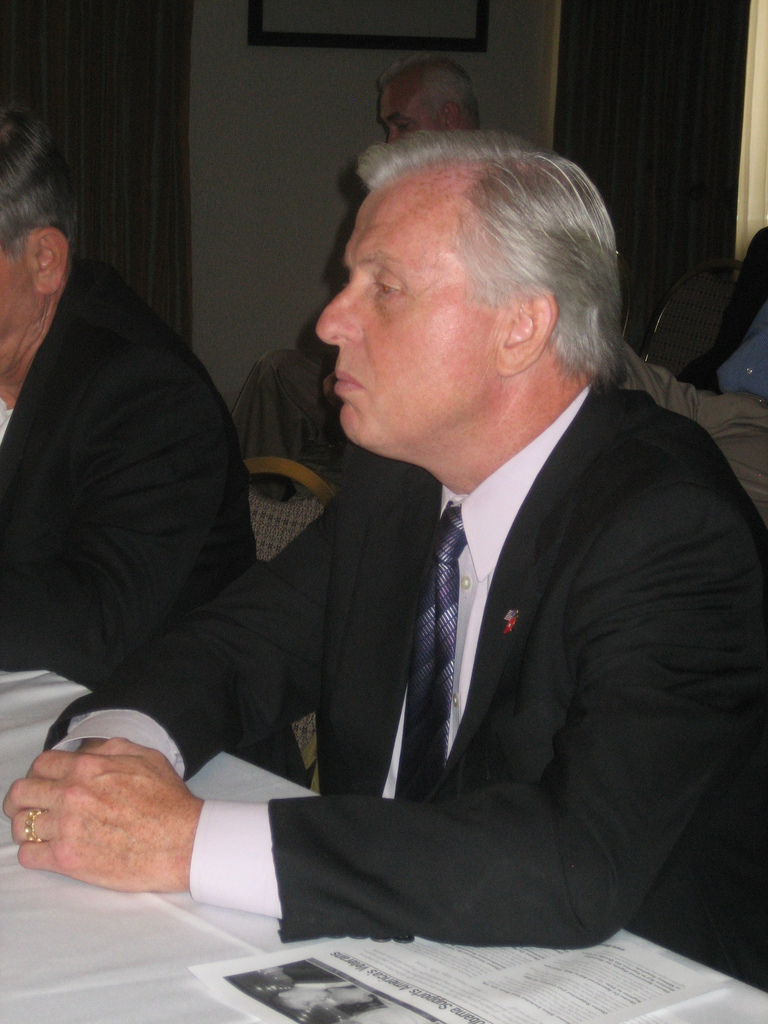
Jack Wagner, Pennsylvania auditor general

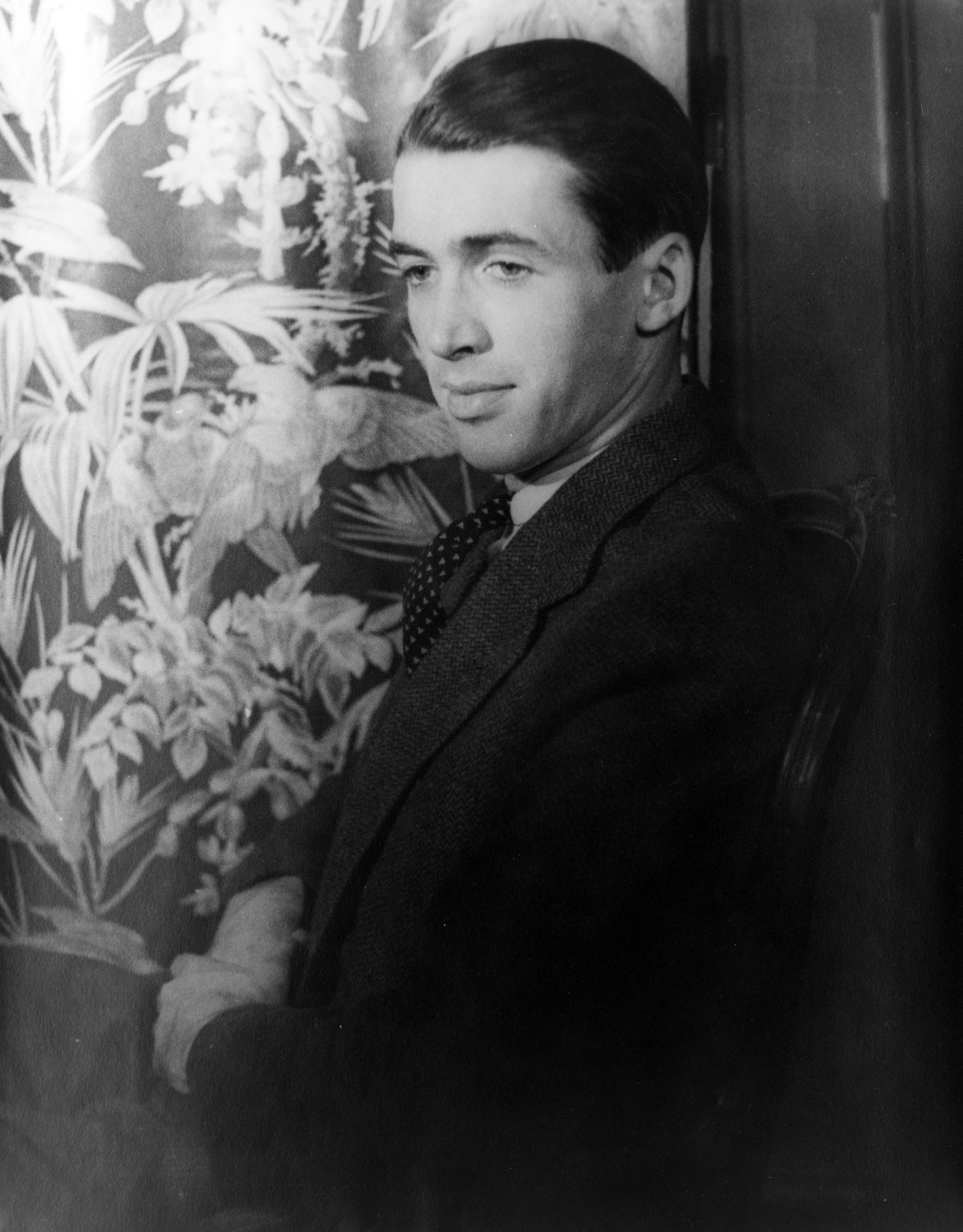
Jimmy Stewart attended Keith Laboratory School (now Keith Hall), a grade school at the Indiana State Teachers College.

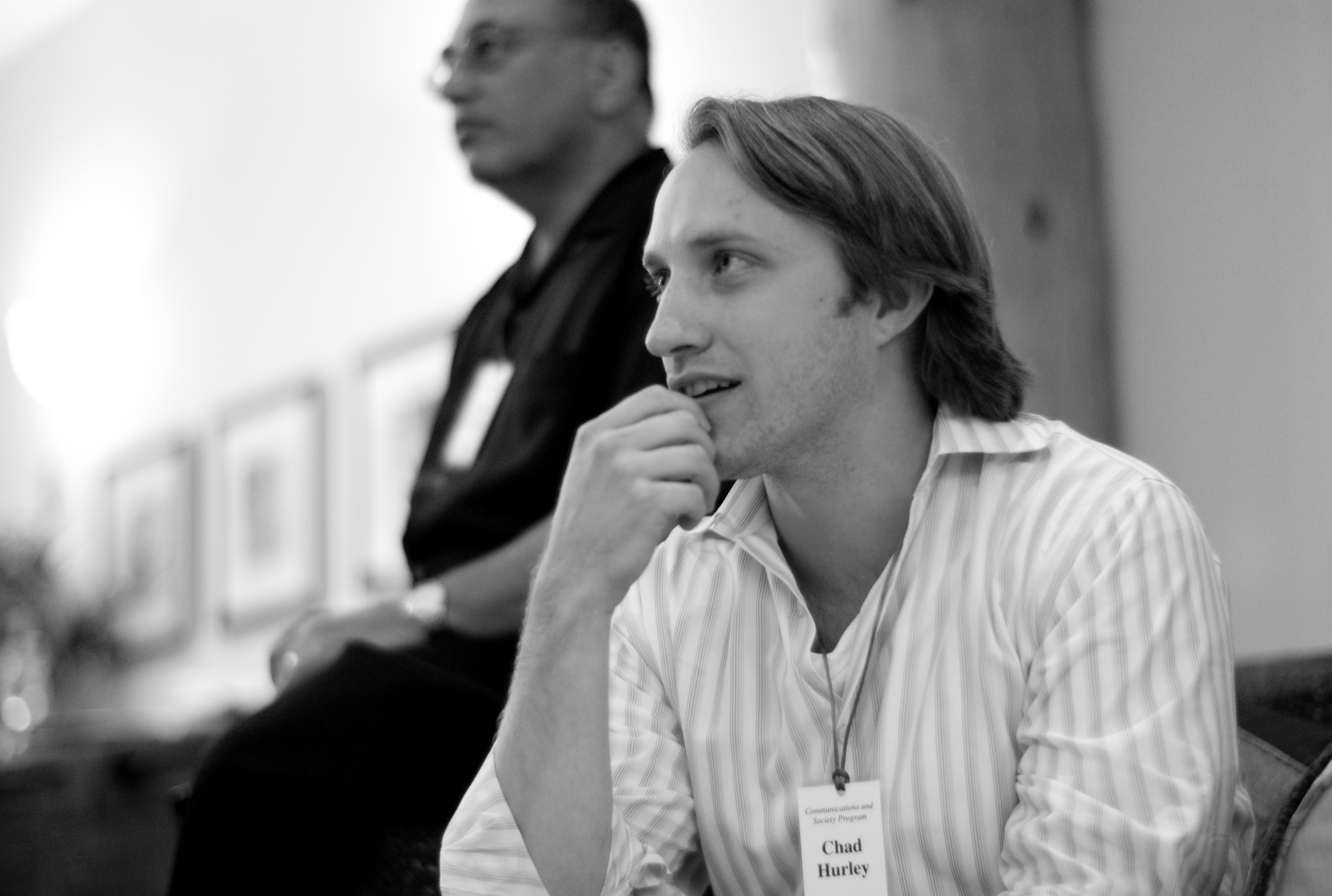
Chad Hurley (1999), co-founder of YouTube

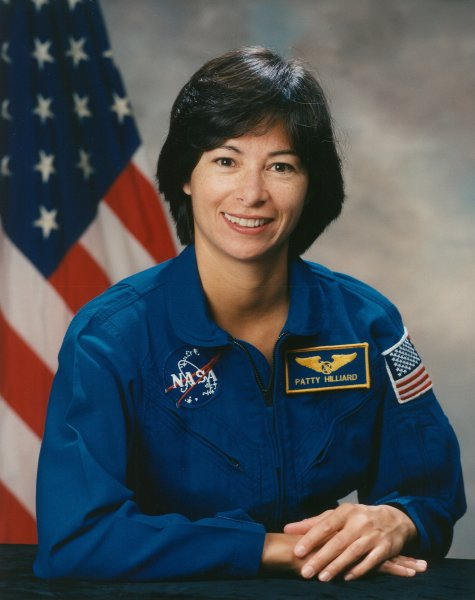
Patricia Robertson (1985), NASA astronaut

Notable alumni of Indiana University of Pennsylvania and its predecessor institutions have included members of the United States Congress, state and federal political officials, business officials, professional athletes and coaches, educational leaders, and a NASA astronaut.

=== Business ===
- Tim Burns (1990) - pharmaceutical technology, politician

=== Politics ===
- Jay Costa (1979) - Pennsylvania State Senate (1996–present)
- Thomas C. Creighton (1970) - Pennsylvania House of Representatives (2001–2013)
- Mark Critz (1987) - United States House of Representatives (2010–2012)
- Charlene Dukes (1980) - first vice chair of the Maryland Democratic Party (2023–present)
- Howard Fargo (1951) - Pennsylvania House of Representatives (1981–2000), Republican Caucus chairman 1995–2000
- John Stuchell Fisher (1886) - governor of Pennsylvania (1927–1931)
- Richard Irvin (attended) - Pennsylvania House of Representatives (2015–present) and former Huntingdon County treasurer (1996–2013)
- Summers Melville Jack - United States House of Representatives (1899–1903)
- William C. Kortz - Pennsylvania House of Representatives (2007–present)
- John Murtha (attended) - United States House of Representatives (1974–2010)
- Dave Reed (2000) - Pennsylvania House of Representatives (2003–2018)
- James B. Renacci (1980) - United States House of Representatives (2011–2019)
- Edward Everett Robbins (attended) - United States House of Representatives (1897–1899, 1917–1919)
- Howard William Stull - United States House of Representatives (1932–1933)
- Jack Wagner (1974) - Pittsburgh City Council (1984–1994), Pennsylvania Senate (1994–2005), Pennsylvania auditor general (2005–2013)

=== Education ===
- Charles Kupchella (1964) - president of University of North Dakota (1999–2008)
- Dana D. Nelson (1984) - professor of English and Department Chair, Vanderbilt University
- Gary A. Olson (Ph.D. 1980) - president-designate of Daemen College (2013–present)
- David Harrill Roberts (Ph.D.1982) professor of rhetoric and linguistics; founding director of University Writing Programs, Samford University (1988-2004)
- Jack Thomas (Ph.D. 1990) - provost of Western Illinois University (2008–2011), president of Western Illinois University (2011–2019)
- Gerald L. Zahorchak (M. 1986) - Pennsylvania secretary of education (2006–2010)

=== Entertainment and media ===
- Nellie Bly, pen name of Elizabeth Jane Cochrane (attended 1879) - journalist
- Jeff Burk - Bizarro author and editor
- The Clarks (attended) - recording artists
- Natalia Esquivel - Costa Rican music educator
- Ian Gallanar - founder and theatrical director of The Chesapeake Shakespeare Company
- Chad Hurley (1999) - co-founder and CEO of YouTube
- Micah Johnson - television anchor, CNN, NBC
- Matthew Knisely - photojournalist
- Jim Krenn - WDVE morning show
- Johnny Sins - pornographic actor, director, and YouTuber
- Trisha Rae Stahl - actress
- Jimmy Stewart (Keith Laboratory School) - actor
- Agnes Sligh Turnbull (1910) - novelist and short story writer
- Lindsey Vuolo - Playboy Playmate

=== Sports ===
- Norm Benning - NASCAR and Automobile Racing Club of America competitor
- Raymond Bernabei - National Soccer Hall of Fame
- John Brallier (1894) - first paid football player, Latrobe Athletic Association, Pittsburgh Athletic Club
- Jason Capizzi (2007) - former United Football League offensive tackle
- Frank Cignetti Jr. (1988) - NCAA and National Football League (NFL) assistant coach, former offensive coordinator of the University of Pittsburgh Panthers
- Frank Cignetti Sr. (1960) - former West Virginia Mountaineers and IUP football head coach
- Paul Failla (1991) - former football player and coach
- Lawson Fiscus (1880s) - one of the first professional football players for the Greensburg Athletic Association
- Kris Griffin (2005) - former NFL linebacker
- Mel Hankinson (1965) - former NCAA head basketball coach
- Jim Haslett (1979) - former NFL player and coach, College Football Hall of Fame
- Jack Henry (1969) - former college and NFL offensive line coach
- George Hill (2011) - National Basketball Association player
- Billy Hunter (1948) - former Major League Baseball player and manager, 1953 All-Star
- Rich Ingold (1985) - former Arena Football League player, current coach of the Wilkes-Barre/Scranton Pioneers
- Mike Jemison (2005) - former NFL running back
- Leander Jordan (2000) - former NFL offensive tackle, Atlanta Falcons
- Ben Lawrence - former NFL player for the Pittsburgh Steelers
- Bob Ligashesky (1985) - NFL assistant coach
- Harry Malcolm (1920s) - former NFL offensive lineman, Frankford Yellow Jackets
- Ben McAdoo (1998) - former NFL head coach, current offensive coordinator
- LeRon McCoy (2005) - former NFL wide receiver
- Kevin McMullan (1990) - former Major League Baseball player, collegiate baseball coach, Virginia Cavaliers
- Mike Menosky - former Major League Baseball player
- Tom Modrak (1964) - director of player personnel for the Buffalo Bills
- Frank Mount Pleasant (1913) - track and field athlete, 1908 Summer Olympics
- Akwasi Owusu-Ansah (2010) - former NFL defensive back
- Dan Radakovich (1981) - Georgia Tech athletic director
- Art Rooney (1920) - founder of the Pittsburgh Steelers
- Dave Smith - former NFL player
- Chris Villarrial (1996) - former NFL player, college head coach
- Jim Wooding - 1984 Summer Olympics, decathlon athlete

=== Miscellaneous ===
- Edward Abbey (attended 1947) - author and environmentalist
- William J. Boardley (1972) - Air National Guard brigadier general
- Rob Boston (1985) - author, assistant director of communications for Americans United for Separation of Church and State
- Randall R. Marchi (1978) - US Army major general
- Patricia Robertson (1985) - NASA astronaut
- Jim Self - tuba player, appeared on over 1500 movie soundtracks
