= Boardley =

Boardley may refer to:

- Carl Boardley (born 1975), English motor-racing driver
- Dianne Boardley Suber, American academic administrator
- Stuart Boardley (born 1985), English professional footballer
- William J. Boardley, former brigadier general in the Pennsylvania Air National Guard
- Boardley, Virginia, an unincorporated community in King and Queen County, Virginia
