= Tyson Chandler =

American basketball player (born 1982)

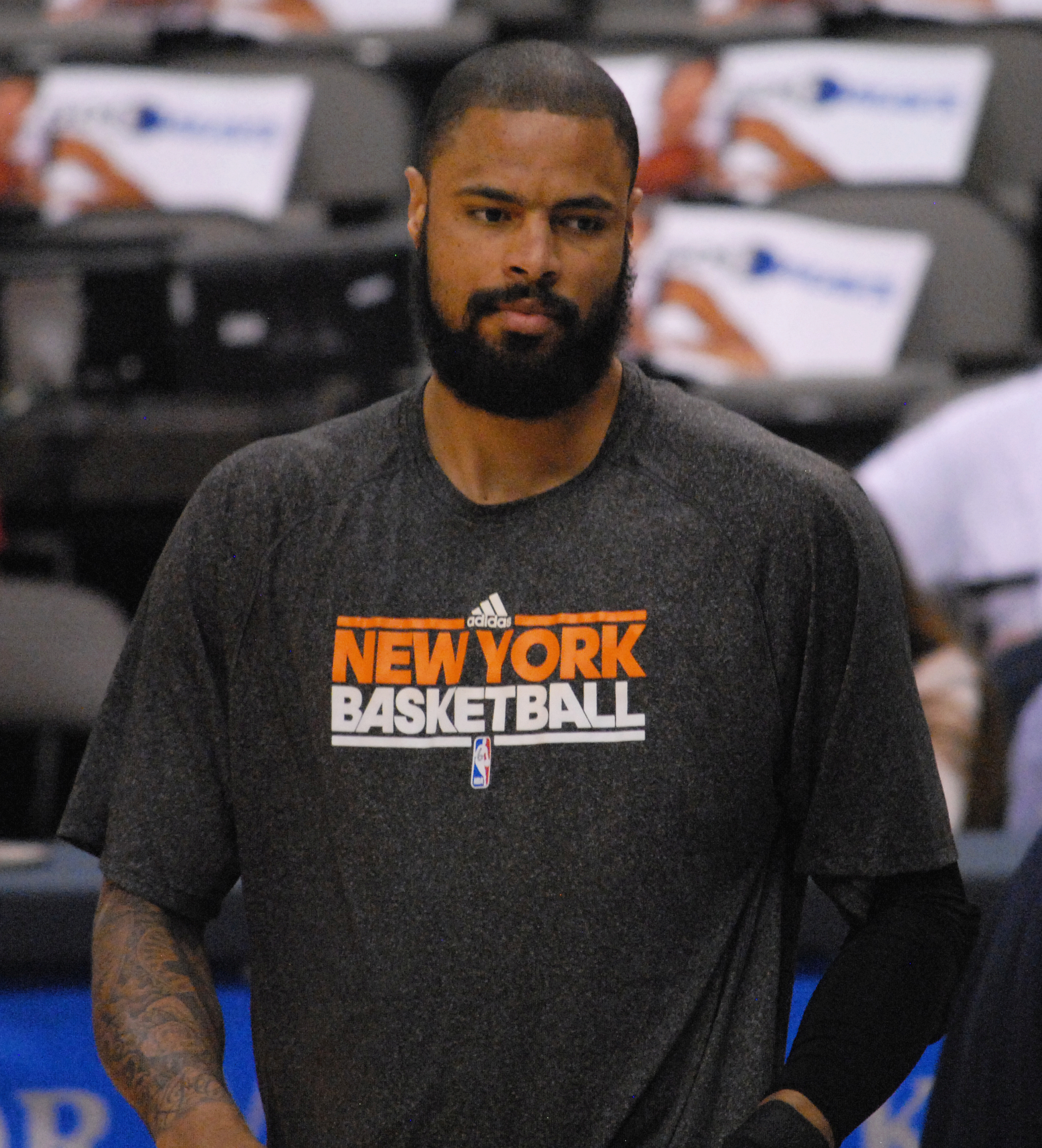
- Chandler with the New York Knicks in 2012

Personal information
- Born: October 2, 1982 (age 44) Hanford, California, U.S.
- Listed height: 7 ft 0 in (2.13 m)
- Listed weight: 235 lb (107 kg)

Career information
- High school: Dominguez (Compton, California)
- NBA draft: 2001: 1st round, 2nd overall pick
- Drafted by: Los Angeles Clippers
- Playing career: 2001–2020
- Position: Center
- Number: 3, 6, 4, 5, 19

Career history
- 2001–2006: Chicago Bulls
- 2006–2009: New Orleans Hornets (Note: During the 2005–06 and 2006–07 seasons, the team was known as the New Orleans/Oklahoma City Hornets during their temporary relocation to Oklahoma City due to Hurricane Katrina.)
- 2009–2010: Charlotte Bobcats
- 2010–2011: Dallas Mavericks
- 2011–2014: New York Knicks
- 2014–2015: Dallas Mavericks
- 2015–2018: Phoenix Suns
- 2018–2019: Los Angeles Lakers
- 2019–2020: Houston Rockets

Career highlights
- NBA champion (2011); NBA All-Star (2013); All-NBA Third Team (2012); NBA Defensive Player of the Year (2012); NBA All-Defensive First Team (2013); 2× NBA All-Defensive Second Team (2011, 2012); First-team Parade All-American (2001); Second-team Parade All-American (2000); McDonald's All-American (2001); 2× California Mr. Basketball (2000, 2001)

Career NBA statistics
- Points: 9,509 (8.2 ppg)
- Rebounds: 10,467 (9.0 rpg)
- Blocks: 1,335 (1.2 bpg)
- Stats at NBA.com
- Stats at Basketball Reference
Medals
Men's basketball
Representing the United States
Olympic Games
Gold medal – first place	2012 London	Team
FIBA World Championship
Gold medal – first place	2010 Turkey	Team
FIBA Americas Championship
Gold medal – first place	2007 Las Vegas

Tyson Cleotis Chandler (born October 2, 1982) is an American former professional basketball player and coach. A 7'0" center, Chandler played for seven teams in an National Basketball Association (NBA) career that spanned from 2001 to 2020.

Chandler was drafted directly out of high school by the Los Angeles Clippers as the second overall pick of the 2001 NBA draft; he was immediately traded to the Chicago Bulls. Chandler also played for the New Orleans Hornets, Charlotte Bobcats, Dallas Mavericks, New York Knicks, Phoenix Suns, and Los Angeles Lakers. As the starting center for Dallas, he played an integral role in the franchise's first NBA championship in 2011.

Chandler was named to the NBA All-Defensive Team three times. While with New York, he was voted the NBA Defensive Player of the Year in 2012; he was also named to the All-NBA Third Team that season. He won gold medals with the US national team in the 2010 FIBA World Championship and the 2012 Summer Olympics.

== Early life ==
Tyson Cleotis Chandler was born on October 2, 1982 in Hanford, California to Frank Chandler and Vernie Threadgill. He did not meet his father until later in life. He grew up on a family farm in Hanford, where he resided with his grandfather until the age of 10.

As a freshman in high school, Chandler enrolled at Dominguez High School in Compton, California. The school was known for its athletics, producing basketball players such as Dennis Johnson and Cedric Ceballos. In his freshman year, Chandler made the varsity basketball team and played with future NBA player Tayshaun Prince, who was then a senior. With the Dominguez Dons, Chandler became a teenage sensation; younger future pros such as DeMar DeRozan watched him play and claimed "he was like Shaq". Point guard Brandon Jennings, who was a ball boy for Dominguez at the time, said, "You'd see the girls around Tyson, the Escalade he drove, and you wanted to be like him". Chandler earned accolades from Parade Magazine and USA Today and was selected to the McDonald's High School All-America Team. As a freshman, he was profiled on current affairs TV program 60 Minutes.

In his junior year, Chandler averaged 20 points, 12 rebounds, 6 assists and 3 blocks. In his senior year, Chandler led Dominguez to a state championship and a 31–4 record, averaging 26 points, 15 rebounds, and 8 blocks a game. Chandler was recruited by several universities and considered UCLA, Arizona, Syracuse, Memphis, Kentucky and Michigan. Chandler then declared for the 2001 NBA draft as a prep-to-pro.

== Professional career ==
=== Chicago Bulls (2001–2006) ===
Chandler was selected by the Los Angeles Clippers with the second overall pick in the 2001 NBA draft, before being immediately traded to the Chicago Bulls for former No. 1 overall pick Elton Brand. The Bulls placed their rebuilding efforts on the backs of two teenagers in Chandler and Eddy Curry.

The 2001-02 season was Chandler's first, where he played 71 games and his season highs being 21 points, 15 rebounds, and 6 assists. Chandler was not nominated for the NBA Rookie of the Year, although he was given 6 total voting points tied with his teammate Trenton Hassell, where Chandler would miss out on the All-NBA Rookie 2nd Team.

Chandler's 2003–04 season saw him appear in a career-low 35 games. He missed two months early in the season with a bad back, before missing the final weeks of the season after landing hard on his back on March 27 against the Atlanta Hawks.

In September 2005, Chandler signed a six-year, $64 million contract with the Bulls.

=== New Orleans Hornets (2006–2009) ===
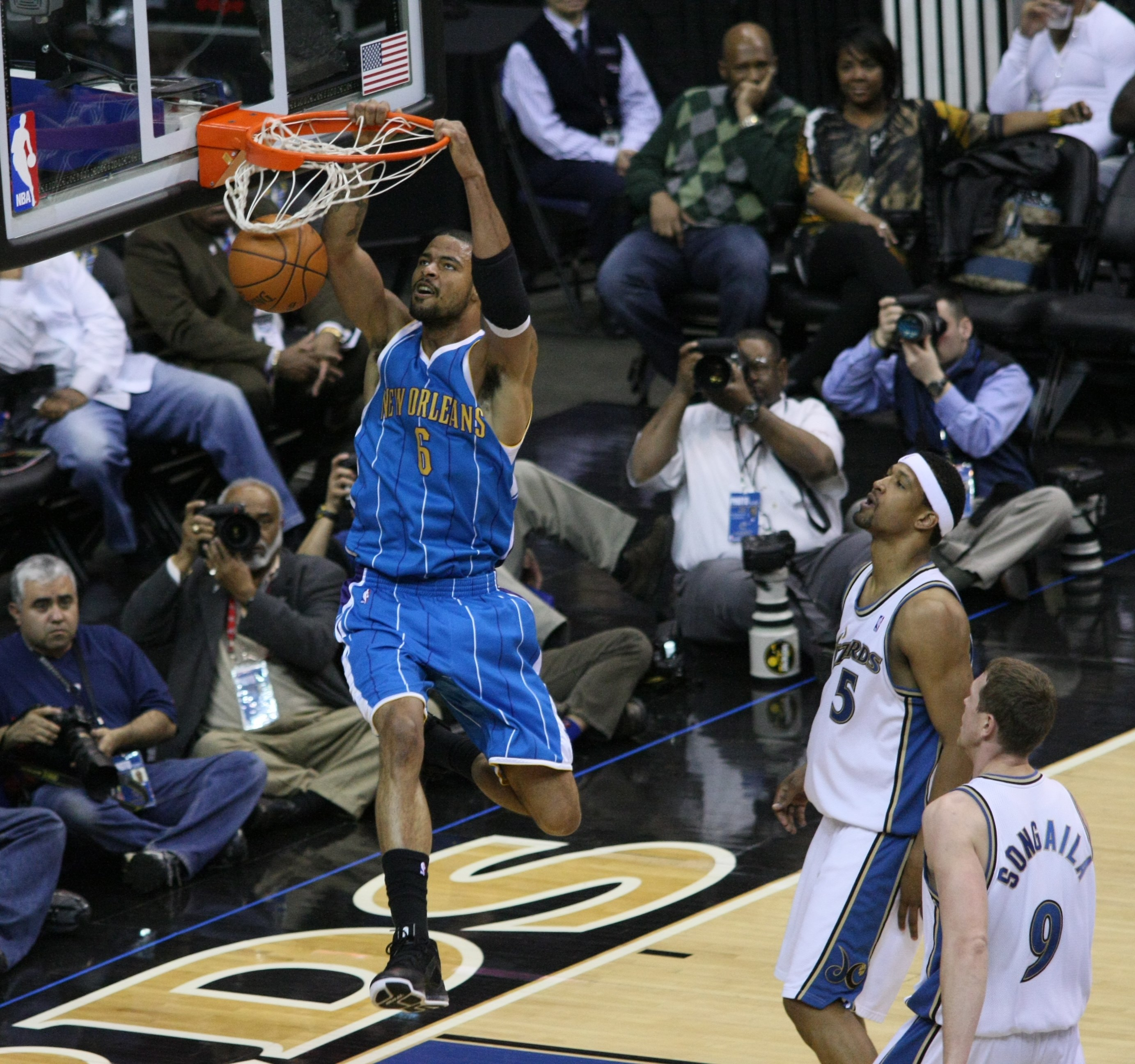
Chandler with the Hornets in March 2009

On July 14, 2006, Chandler was traded to the New Orleans Hornets in exchange for P. J. Brown and J. R. Smith.

Chandler led the NBA in offensive rebounds in both 2006–07 and 2007–08, ranking second in the league in rebounds per game in 2006–07 and third in rebounds per game in 2007–08. He also ranked second in the NBA in field goal percentage in 2007–08 (.623).

On February 17, 2009, Chandler was traded to the Oklahoma City Thunder in exchange for Chris Wilcox, Joe Smith and the draft rights to DeVon Hardin. After examining Chandler's left big toe however, the Thunder determined that the risk of re-injury was too great and did not give Chandler a clean bill of health. As a result, on February 18, the trade was rescinded and Chandler was sent back to the Hornets. Chandler appeared in just 45 games during the 2008–09 season, missing 29 of the team's final 44 games due to left ankle injuries. Chandler finished the 2008–09 season as the franchise's all-time leader in field goal percentage (.611) and rebounds per game (11.3), while ranking fifth in total rebounds despite playing just 197 career games with the team (2,225).

=== Charlotte Bobcats (2009–2010) ===
On July 28, 2009, Chandler was traded to the Charlotte Bobcats in exchange for Emeka Okafor. In his lone season with the Bobcats, Chandler played in 51 games (starting 27) and averaged 6.5 points, 6.3 rebounds and 1.1 blocks despite being hampered by a stress reaction in his left foot that caused him to miss 29 games.

=== Dallas Mavericks (2010–2011) ===
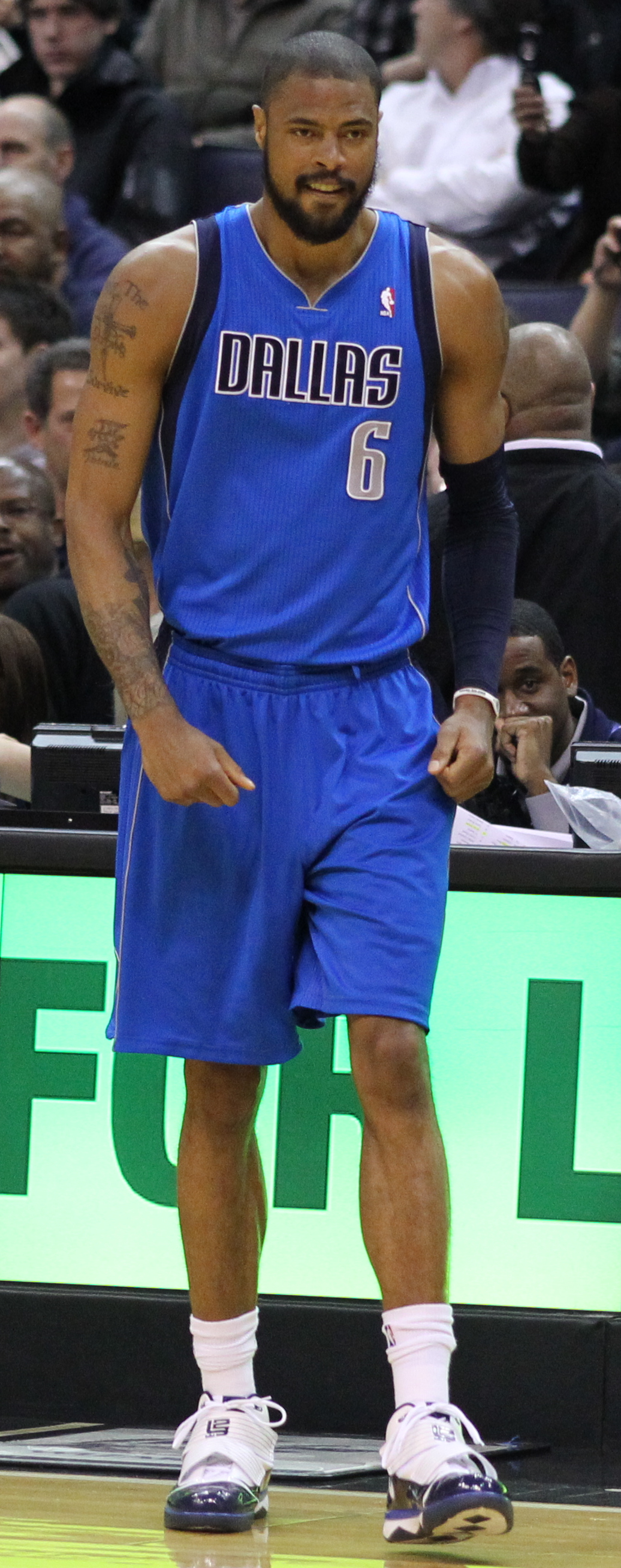
Chandler with the Mavericks in February 2011

On July 13, 2010, Chandler was traded, along with Alexis Ajinça, to the Dallas Mavericks in exchange for Erick Dampier, Eduardo Nájera, Matt Carroll and cash considerations. During his first season with the Mavericks, Chandler anchored the squad's defense on a team with Dirk Nowitzki, Jason Terry and Jason Kidd. He was credited with changing the Mavericks' defensive culture and giving the team a toughness and defensive intensity that it had previously lacked. He earned a selection to the NBA All-Defensive Second Team for his efforts. He helped the Mavericks reach the 2011 NBA Finals, where they faced the Miami Heat. In Game 4 against the Heat, with Nowitzki under the weather and ailing backup center Brendan Haywood unable to stay in the game, Chandler had 13 points and 16 rebounds in an 86–83 win that tied the series at 2–2. The Mavericks went on to defeat the Heat in six games, with Chandler winning his first and only championship. He was instrumental in the team's victory. The championship was also the first in the history of the Dallas Mavericks franchise.

Following the 2010–11 season, Chandler was viewed as a highly sought-after free agent. He was heavily courted by the Golden State Warriors and Houston Rockets, among other teams. While they were keen to retain him, the Mavericks were cautious not to overspend on Chandler and risk missing out on Dwight Howard or Deron Williams in 2012. As a result, they offered only a two-year deal to Chandler; he declined the offer. In August 2016, Chandler opined that if the Mavericks had not broken up their 2011 championship-winning team, they would have gone on to win another title in 2012.

=== New York Knicks (2011–2014) ===
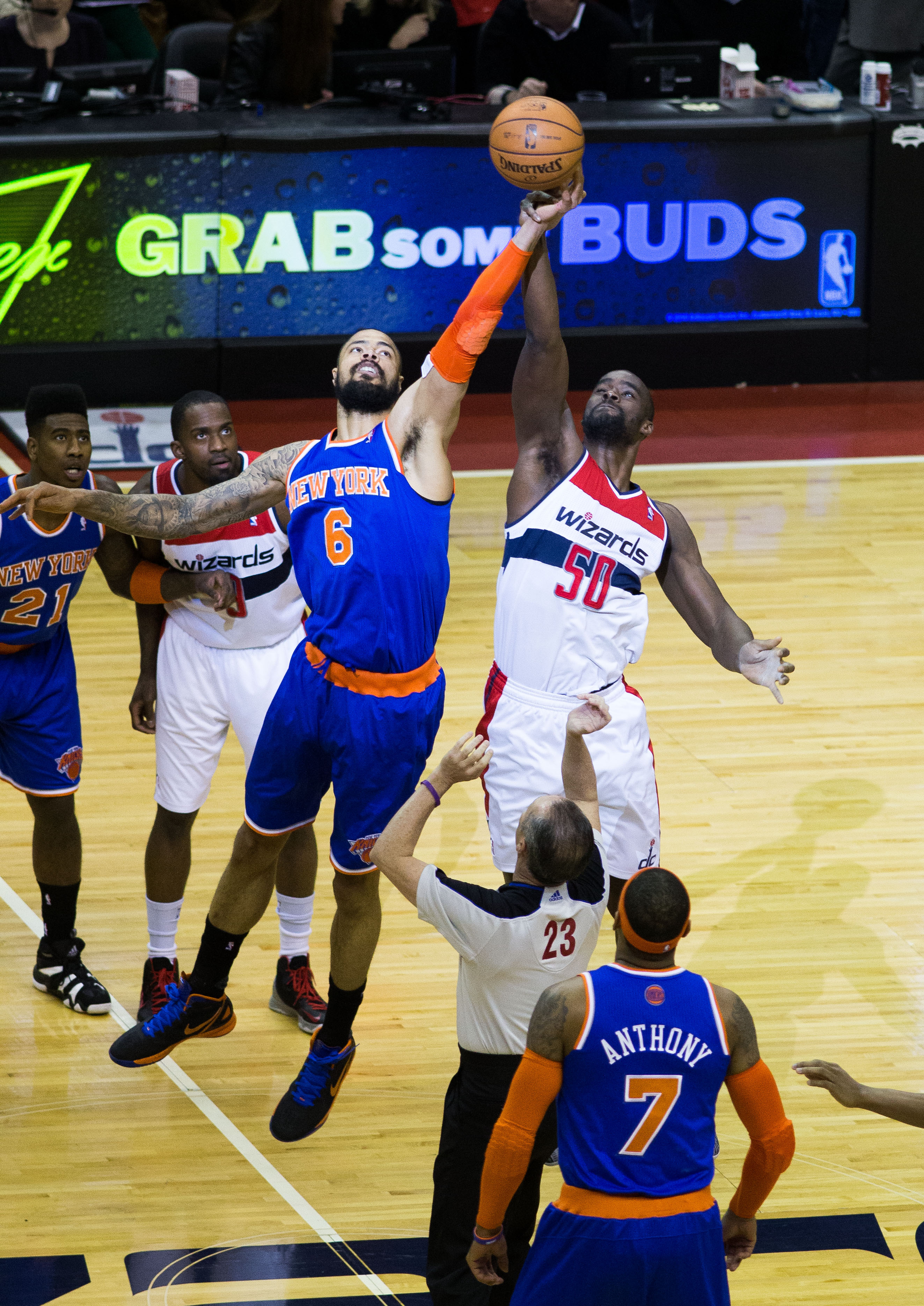
Chandler (#6) with the Knicks in March 2013

On December 10, 2011, Chandler was acquired by the New York Knicks via sign-and-trade as part of a three-team trade, joining the Knicks on a reported four-year, $58 million contract. With Chandler anchoring the middle, New York's defense improved markedly in 2011–12. After finishing 22nd in defensive efficiency in 2010–11, the Knicks finished fifth in defensive efficiency in 2011–12. Chandler finished the season with a league-leading 67.9 field-goal percentage, the third highest in league history at the time behind only Wilt Chamberlain with 72.7 in 1972–73 and 68.3 in 1966–67. In May 2012, he was named the NBA Defensive Player of the Year and earned NBA All-Defensive Second Team honors. He became the first player in franchise history to win Defensive Player of the Year, and joined Alvin Robertson (1986) and Dikembe Mutombo (1995) as defensive players of the year on the Second All-Defensive Team. Due to a different voting system for All-Defensive, Oklahoma City's Serge Ibaka was the forward on the first team, while Orlando's Dwight Howard was the center. Additionally, Chandler was named to the All-NBA Third Team.

In January 2013, Chandler was named an NBA All-Star for the first time in his 12-year career, earning selection as an Eastern Conference reserve for the 2013 NBA All-Star Game. In early February, he tied a franchise record with three straight 20-rebound games, becoming the first Knicks player to have 20 in three straight games since Willis Reed in December 1969. On February 27, he had 16 points and a career-best 28 rebounds in a 109–105 win over the Golden State Warriors. In May 2013, he was named in the NBA All-Defensive First Team, becoming the first Knicks player to earn first-team honors since Charles Oakley in 1994.

Chandler's 2013–14 season was marred by injuries. A right knee injury suffered on November 5 against the Charlotte Bobcats and an upper respiratory illness endured in early January resulted in Chandler appearing in just 55 games.

=== Second stint with Dallas (2014–2015) ===
On June 25, 2014, Chandler was traded back to the Dallas Mavericks along with Raymond Felton in exchange for Shane Larkin, Wayne Ellington, José Calderón, Samuel Dalembert, and two second round picks in the 2014 NBA draft. The move reunited Chandler with championship comrades Dirk Nowitzki and J. J. Barea, as well as coach Rick Carlisle. In 75 games during the 2014–15 season, Chandler averaged a double-double with 10.3 points on 66.6 percent shooting and 11.5 rebounds, in addition to 1.2 blocks.

=== Phoenix Suns (2015–2018) ===
On July 9, 2015, Chandler signed a four-year, $52 million contract with the Phoenix Suns. On January 23, 2016, in a 98–95 win over the Atlanta Hawks, Chandler tied a Suns record with 27 rebounds, including 17 in the first half, and also had 13 points and a season-high five assists. His 27 rebounds equaled the record total set by Paul Silas in 1971, and his 13 offensive boards set a franchise record. Chandler also became the first Suns player in franchise history to record consecutive 20-rebound games.

On December 13, 2016, Chandler grabbed a season-best 23 rebounds in a 113–111 overtime win over the New York Knicks. With his third 20-rebound game of the season on January 3 in a 99–90 win over the Miami Heat, On January 21, in a 107–105 win over the New York Knicks, Chandler set a team record by grabbing 15-plus rebounds in seven consecutive games. His best stretch of the season came between January 19–24, where he had three games of over 16 points (averaging 17.25) and over 16 rebounds (averaging 14.5), including scoring a season-high 22 points twice. Chandler appeared in 47 of the Suns' first 57 games before being deactivated following the All-Star break. Chandler reportedly told Suns management at the trade deadline he did not want to be dealt, and they acquiesced to his wishes.

During the 2017–18 season, Chandler battled through a neck injury that sidelined him for 36 games. He missed the final month of the season.

After starting the 2018–19 season with a reduced role due to the arrival of rookie Deandre Ayton, Chandler and the Suns reached a buyout agreement on November 4, 2018.

=== Los Angeles Lakers (2018–2019) ===
On November 6, 2018, Chandler signed with the Los Angeles Lakers.

=== Houston Rockets (2019–2020) ===
On July 19, 2019, Chandler signed with the Houston Rockets. Chandler's final NBA playoff game was Game 5 of the first round of the 2020 Western Conference playoffs on August 29, 2020 against the Oklahoma City Thunder.

== National team career ==
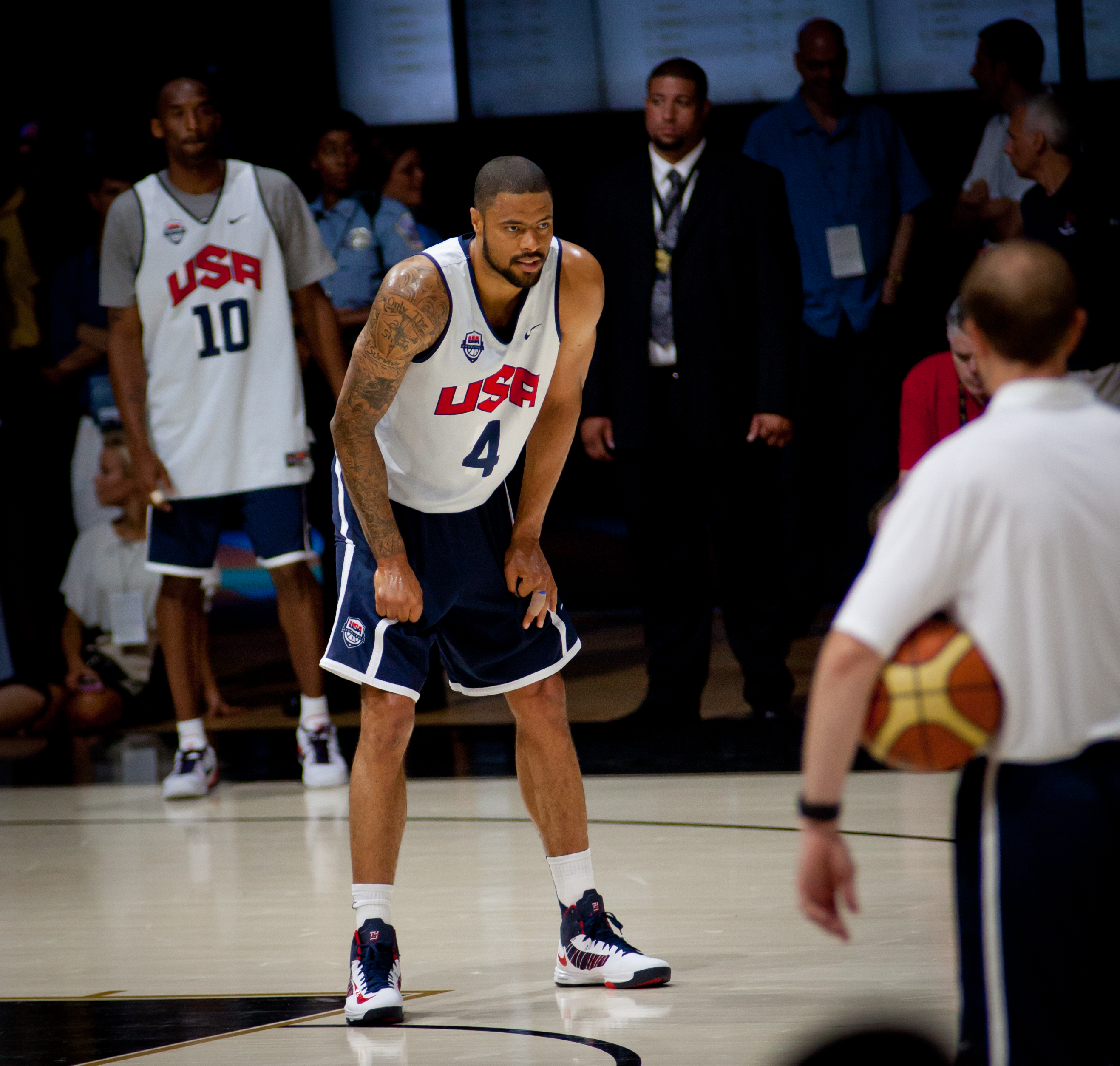
Chandler with the US national team in July 2012

Chandler was named first alternate on the United States national team which competed in the 2008 Beijing Olympics.

Chandler was a member of the United States team at the 2010 FIBA World Championship, a team that finished 9–0 in the tournament and won the gold medal, the USA's first world championship since 1994. He played in all nine World Championship games as a backup center, averaged 2.6 ppg and 2.7 rpg, shot 64.3 percent from the field, and blocked five shots.

Chandler was chosen to play for the United States team in the 2012 London Summer Olympics, and was named the team's starting center. The United States team finished undefeated in the tournament and won the gold medal over Spain with a 107–100 victory. Chandler played 9 minutes, and made 1 of 2 shots from the field. He ended the game with two points, which were the first points scored during the game.

== Coaching career ==
In the summer of 2021, Chandler became a player development coach for the Dallas Mavericks, joining head coach and former teammate Jason Kidd. The strategic hire, along with former Maverick champion, JJ Barea, was a part of the "Mavs Legends" coaching program created by owner Mark Cuban. Chandler, works specifically with the team's centers, including Dereck Lively II. His role is specifically geared towards helping players improve their skills and understanding of the game.

== Personal life ==
Chandler's sister, Erica, played basketball at Pepperdine University. He has three brothers: Terrell, Tervon, and Ryan. His paternal grandmother is of German descent. Chandler is the son of Frank Chandler and the late Vernie Re Threadgill.

Chandler and his wife Kimberly were married in 2005 and separated in August 2021. In September 2021, she filed for divorce, citing irreconcilable differences. They have three children.

In 2013, he became an evangelical Christian and a member of Hillsong Church New York.

== Off the court ==
In 2005, Tyson and Kimberly Chandler organized a charity to help New Orleans families who suffered from Hurricane Katrina. The charity helped purchase "small things" (as Chandler said) for the families' homes: TVs, stoves, microwaves, refrigerators, pots, pans etc. The wives of Chandler's teammates helped in the efforts.

In 2016, Chandler joined UNICEF Kid Power as a UNICEF Kid Power Champion for a mission in Uganda, in an effort to fight global malnutrition and as well as raise awareness among kids, via the world's first "wearable for good".

Chandler is involved in several notable real estate investments. In 2012, Chandler had a successful collaboration with Esquivel shoes, creating a shoe he described as “hybrid boot and dress shoe.” He also worked on a collection with Joseph Abboud.

In 2011, Chandler was the subject of a limited edition 100-copy zine titled "Tyson Chandler". The zine was created in fall 2011 by Camilla Venturini and the photographer Ari Marcopoulos, and was the subject of a lengthy article in the Wall Street Journal.

== NBA career statistics ==
Legend
GP	Games played	GS	Games started	MPG	Minutes per game
FG%	Field goal percentage	3P%	3-point field goal percentage	FT%	Free throw percentage
RPG	Rebounds per game	APG	Assists per game	SPG	Steals per game
BPG	Blocks per game	PPG	Points per game	**Bold**	Career high
†	Won an NBA championship	*	Led the league

=== Regular season ===
Year	Team	GP	GS	MPG	FG%	3P%	FT%	RPG	APG	SPG	BPG	PPG
2001–02	Chicago	71	31	19.6	.497	—	.604	4.8	.8	.4	1.3	6.1
2002–03	Chicago	75	68	24.4	.531	—	.608	6.9	1.0	.5	1.4	9.2
2003–04	Chicago	35	8	22.3	.424	.000	.669	7.7	.7	.5	1.2	6.1
2004–05	Chicago	**80**	10	27.4	.494	.000	.673	9.7	.8	**.9**	**1.8**	8.0
2005–06	Chicago	79	50	26.8	.565	.000	.503	9.0	1.0	.5	1.3	5.3
2006–07	New Orleans	73	73	34.6	.624	.000	.527	**12.4**	.9	.5	**1.8**	9.5
2007–08	New Orleans	79	**79**	**35.2**	.623	.000	.593	11.7	1.0	.6	1.1	**11.8**
2008–09	New Orleans	45	45	32.1	.565	—	.579	8.7	.5	.3	1.2	8.8
2009–10	Charlotte	51	27	22.8	.574	—	.732	6.3	.3	.3	1.1	6.5
2010–11†	Dallas	74	74	27.8	.654	—	.732	9.4	.4	.5	1.1	10.1
2011–12	New York	62	62	33.2	.679*	.000	.689	11.0	.9	**.9**	1.4	11.3
2012–13	New York	66	66	32.8	.638	—	.694	10.7	.9	.6	1.1	10.4
2013–14	New York	55	55	30.2	.593	.000	.632	9.6	**1.1**	.7	1.1	8.7
2014–15	Dallas	75	75	30.5	.666	—	.720	11.5	**1.1**	.6	1.2	10.3
2015–16	Phoenix	66	60	24.5	.583	.000	.620	8.7	1.0	.5	.7	7.2
2016–17	Phoenix	47	46	27.6	.671	—	**.734**	11.5	.6	.7	.5	8.4
2017–18	Phoenix	46	46	25.0	.647	—	.617	9.1	1.2	.3	.6	6.5
2018–19	Phoenix	7	0	12.7	.667	—	.556	5.6	.9	.3	.1	3.7
2018–19	L.A. Lakers	48	6	16.4	.609	.000	.594	5.6	.6	.4	.5	3.1
2019–20	Houston	26	5	8.4	**.778**	—	.462	2.5	.2	.2	.3	1.3
Career		1,160	886	27.3	.597	.000	.644	9.0	.8	.5	1.2	8.2
All-Star		1	0	17.0	.400	.000	1.000	8.0	.0	.0	.0	7.0

=== Playoffs ===
Year	Team	GP	GS	MPG	FG%	3P%	FT%	RPG	APG	SPG	BPG	PPG
2005	Chicago	6	0	28.7	.475	.000	.696	9.7	**1.3**	.2	**2.2**	**11.7**
2006	Chicago	6	0	17.3	**.667**	.000	.300	4.5	.5	.3	.3	1.8
2008	New Orleans	12	12	**34.3**	.632	.000	.625	10.3	.4	.4	1.7	8.0
2009	New Orleans	4	4	23.5	.500	.000	.500	5.3	.5	.5	.3	3.8
2010	Charlotte	4	0	15.0	.545	.000	.667	2.5	.5	.5	.8	3.5
2011†	Dallas	**21**	**21**	32.4	.582	.000	.679	9.2	.4	.6	.9	8.0
2012	New York	5	5	33.4	.440	.000	.600	9.0	.8	**1.4**	1.4	6.2
2013	New York	12	12	29.2	.538	.000	**.750**	7.3	.3	.7	1.2	5.7
2015	Dallas	5	5	32.0	.655	.000	.500	**10.8**	.2	.6	1.2	10.2
2020	Houston	1	0	0.0	.000	.000	.000	0.0	0.0	0.0	0.0	0.0
Career		76	59	28.9	.566	.000	.628	8.1	.5	.6	1.1	6.9

== See also ==
- List of NBA career rebounding leaders
- List of NBA career blocks leaders
- List of NBA career personal fouls leaders
- List of NBA career field goal percentage leaders
- List of NBA seasons played leaders
