= Ian Gallanar =

American theatre director

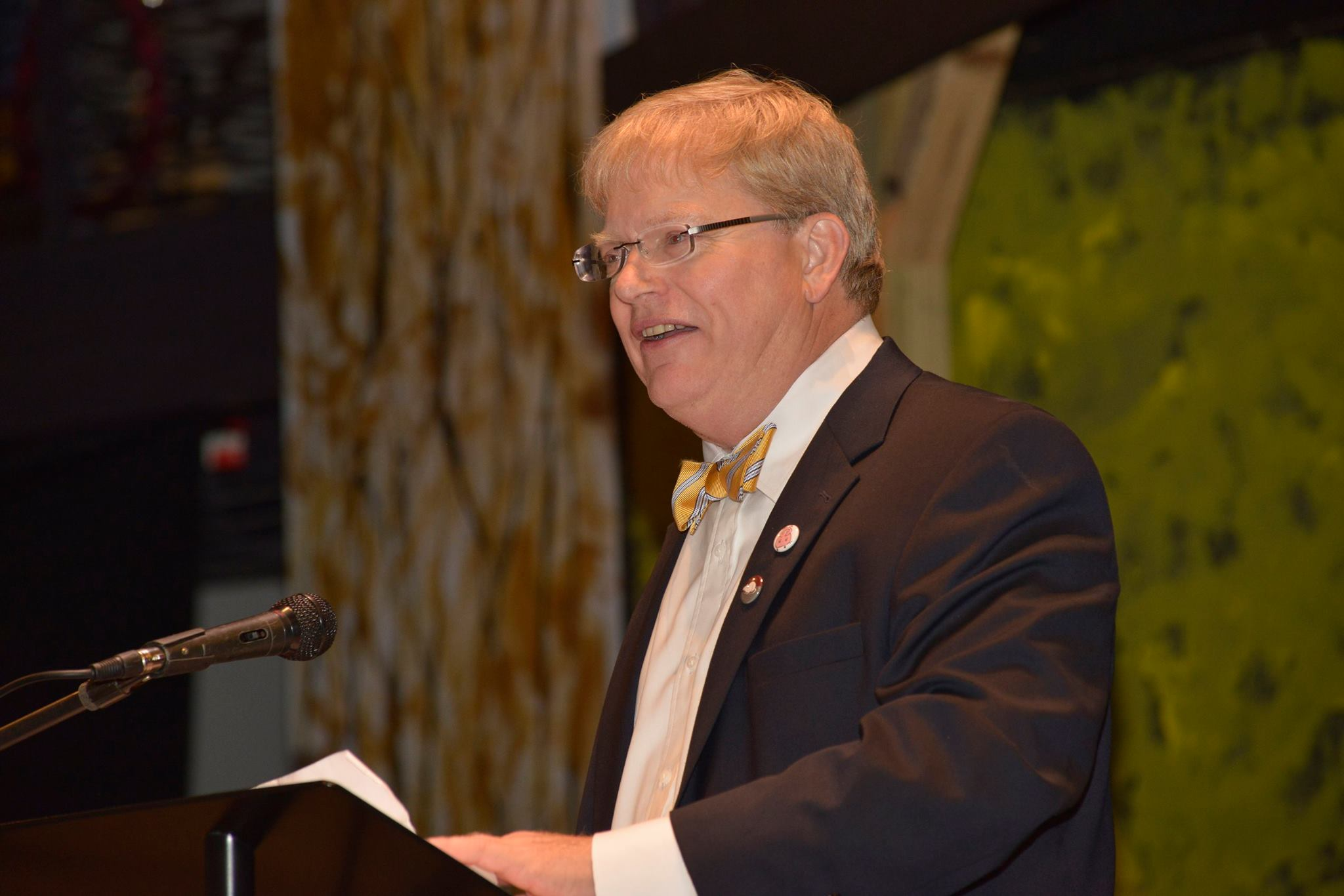
Ian Gallanar

Ian Gallanar is an American theatre director. He is the founder and current Artistic Director of the Chesapeake Shakespeare Company.

== Life and career ==
Gallanar trained at the Indiana University of Pennsylvania. His early career was mostly as an actor and playwright having performed and written for companies across the United States including New City Theater, The Seattle Theater Project, Repertory Theater of America, North Carolina Theater for Young People, etc. In 1989, he co-founded the Seattle Performance Lab and was its Co-Artistic Director for two seasons. He was the Artistic Director of The National Theatre for Children and led the company through its growth into the nation's most active children's theater from 1993 to 1998. At NTC, Gallanar wrote and directed productions that reached well over 3 million students across the country. In 1997, Gallanar founded the Minnesota Shakespeare in the Park in Minneapolis.

In 2002, Gallanar founded The Chesapeake Shakespeare Company. The Chesapeake Shakespeare Company is the largest classical theater in Maryland with annual operating budgets of $3M. He has directed a number of productions with the Chesapeake Shakespeare Company including Hamlet, Romeo and Juliet, King Lear, Coriolanus, Much Ado About Nothing, A Midsummer Night's Dream, Lysistrata, The Front Page, As You Like It, Cyrano de Bergerac, Twelfth Night and many others. In 2012, the Chesapeake Shakespeare Company acquired the Mercantile Trust and Deposit Company building in Downtown Baltimore in order to convert it into a modern Shakespearean playhouse. The Chesapeake Shakespeare Theater opened on September 19, 2014. In 2017, CSC expanded its operations ever further with the opening of The Studio at the Chesapeake Shakespeare Company, located next door to the existing theater. The Studio is a classroom, rehearsal and alternative performance space.

In 2023, Gallanar and the Chesapeake Shakespeare Company launched Shakespeare Beyond, a program to bring live performances and arts experiences to neighborhoods in Baltimore and communities across the State of Maryland.

Chesapeake Shakespeare Company's theater education programming is the largest in the State of Maryland and the organization, as a whole, serves as a model for arts organizations around the country for its sustained growth and strategic development.

Ian Gallanar is a Howie Award Winner (Howard County, Maryland) for Outstanding Artist for lifetime achievement in the arts, a Distinguished Alumni of Indiana University of Pennsylvania, a Telly Award Winner, a Helen Hayes Tribute Award Winner and a member of the prestigious National Theater Conference. Ian is a Past-President of the international Shakespeare Theatre Association and was a recipient of their 2023 Sandra and Sidney Berger Award given in recognition of lifetime achievements as an Artistic Director of one of the world's Shakespeare theaters.

== Original works ==
- Lower Than the Angels (1987)
- The Course of Human Events (1989)
- Showdown at Dry Gulch (1994)
- Adventures in Sherwood Forest (1996)
- Radio Aahs on Stage (1995)
- Carmen Sandiego Live! (1996)
- Bubba's Killer Sauce (1999)
- Lysistrata (original adaptation) (2010)
- A Christmas Carol (original adaptation) (2014)
- It’s The Comedy of Errors, Hon (2025)
