= Julia Esquivel =

Guatemalan author and activist (1930–2019)

Julia Esquivel Velásquez
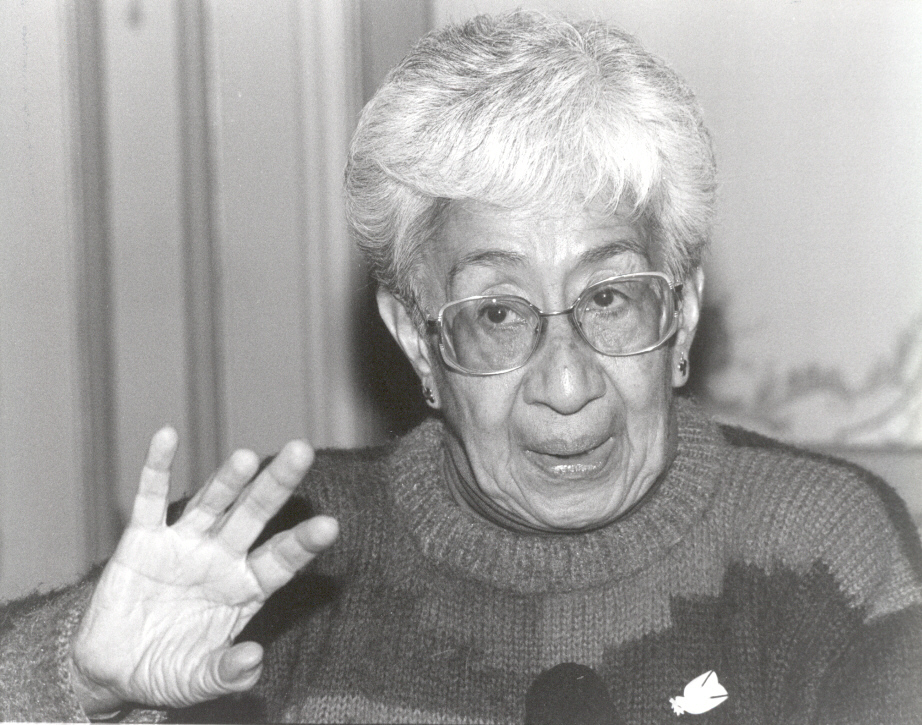
- Born: May 3, 1930; San Marcos, Guatemala
- Died: July 19, 2019 (aged 89); Guatemala City
- Occupations: Poet; Theologian

Julia Esquivel Velásquez (May 3, 1930 – July 19, 2019) was a Guatemalan poet, protestant theologian and human rights activist.

== Biography ==
Esquivel was an academic at San Carlos University, Guatemala, the Seminario Biblico Latinoamericano in Costa Rica and the Bossey Ecumenical Institute in Switzerland.

Her poetry was heavily influenced by the Theology of Liberation, which was widespread in Latin American Catholic communities in the 1950s and 1960s. She had initially requested to study theology at a Presbyterian seminary in Guatemala but was rejected on the basis of her sex. She moved to Costa Rica in 1953 in order to study at the Latin America Biblical Seminary in San José, Costa Rica instead. During her lifetime she received numerous death threats due to her raising concerns regarding the human rights of the Indigenous Maya peoples and went into exile in 1980 in Switzerland.

During this period of exile Esquivel spoke widely across Europe and North America about the plight of Maya, Quiché and other indigenous people in the Guatemalan genocide. She was the author of seven books including two collections of poetry Threatened with Resurrection (1982) and The Certainty of Spring (1993).

In 1994, she received an Honorary Doctorate from the University of Bern for her poetry which the University noted "gave voice to the suffering of the Guatemalan people in her spiritual poetry."

Esquivel died in Guatemala City on July 19, 2019.
