= Eileen Glisan =

American linguist

Eileen Glisan is a professor of Spanish language and Spanish language education at Indiana University of Pennsylvania. She was elected as the President of the American Council on the Teaching of Foreign Languages for 2009.
