= Emilio Morote Esquivel =

Spanish writer

Emilio Morote Esquivel (Badajoz, 1966) is a Spanish writer from Ciudad Real.

== Books ==
- Náufragos (2002)
- Lágrimas privadas (2005)
- Cuentos nocturnos (2007)
- El sendero eterno (2007)
- Los mejores años de nuestras vidas (2008)
- El reino de los cielos (2013)
- Rumores de perfección (2014)
- Negrata con tres patas (2020)
