= William J. Boardley =

United States Air Force general

William J. Boardley is a former brigadier general in the Pennsylvania Air National Guard.

== Career ==
Boardley graduated from the Air Force Officer Training School in 1972. He then underwent navigator training at Mather Air Force Base and combat crew training at Castle Air Force Base.

From 1974 to 1978, Boardley was a navigator with the 9th Air Refueling Squadron. He then transferred to the 147th Air Refueling Squadron of the Pennsylvania Air National Guard. While there, he was deployed to serve in the Gulf War as an air crew member and staff planner.

In 1995, Boardley assumed command of the 171st Air Refueling Wing. He later took part in Operation Allied Force during the Kosovo War. In March 2006, he was commander of the 171 Air Expeditionary Wing during Operation Iraqi Freedom.

Awards he received during his career include the Legion of Merit, the Bronze Star Medal, the Air Medal, the Air Force Commendation Medal, the Air Force Outstanding Unit Award, the Combat Readiness Medal, the National Defense Service Medal, the Southwest Asia Service Medal, the Armed Forces Service Medal, the Humanitarian Service Medal, the Air Force Longevity Service Award, the Armed Forces Reserve Medal, the Air Force Training Ribbon, the Kuwait Liberation Medal of Saudi Arabia and the Kuwait Liberation Medal of Kuwait.

General Boardley is also a member of the Pennsylvania Air National Guard Hall of Fame.

== Education ==
- Indiana University of Pennsylvania
- Squadron Officer School
- Air Command and Staff College
- Air War College
