= Natalia Esquivel =

Costa Rican composer, guitarist, singer-songwriter and author

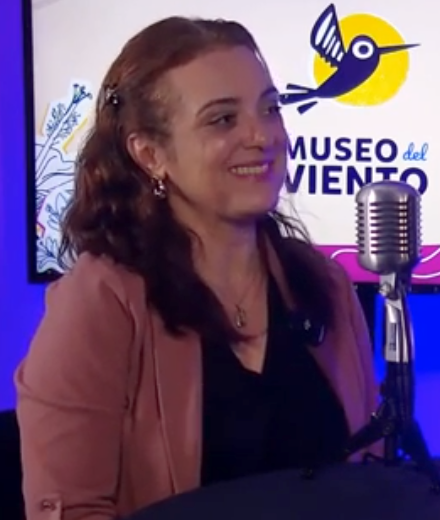
- In a 2025 interview

Background information
- Born: Natalia Esquivel Benítez; 15 December 1973 (age 52); San José, Costa Rica
- Occupations: composer, guitarist, singer-songwriter, vocalist, author, poet, musical educator
- Years active: 1993–present

Natalia Esquivel Benítez (born 15 December 1973 in San José) is a Costa Rican composer, guitarist, singer-songwriter, author, poet, vocalist and academic in musical education.

== Career ==
Esquivel studied musical education at the National University of Costa Rica; further she obtained a master's degree at the Indiana University of Pennsylvania.

Esquivel has been actively promoting the development of reading and music for children, alongside the concept of "musicking" set forth by Christopher Small; music is conceived as a process to help build learning and enhance the pupil's abilities, including the development of competencies needed in their life. Her music workshops, supported by religious authorities, have set a local precedent in this regard. Another meaningful influence in her work has been the German Orff Schulwerk.

Esquivel has been an artist-in-residence with Spanish composer of social music Marta Lozano Molano, conducting a musical project for rural areas and communities under social risk; its 17 songs invite to reflect on ecological and social values, based on the 17 UN Sustainable Development Goals.

=== Style ===
Her musical repertoire is inspired by the work of Billy Joel, Ana Belén, Silvio Rodríguez, Pablo Milanés, and Violeta Parra, among others.

== Selected works ==
- Arrullos de sol y mar (Clubdelibros, 2015; 2nd ed. 2021)
- Música para el niño preescolar (EUNED, 2017)
- Nana de la luna (Ocarina, 2020)
- Andamios de lluvia (Poiesis Ediciones, 2021)
- Canto planetario: hermandad en la Tierra. Volumen I (various authors, ed. Carlos Javier Jarquín). Antology. Costa Rica: H.C. Editores, 2023.
