= List of Billboard Top LPs number-one albums of 1962 =

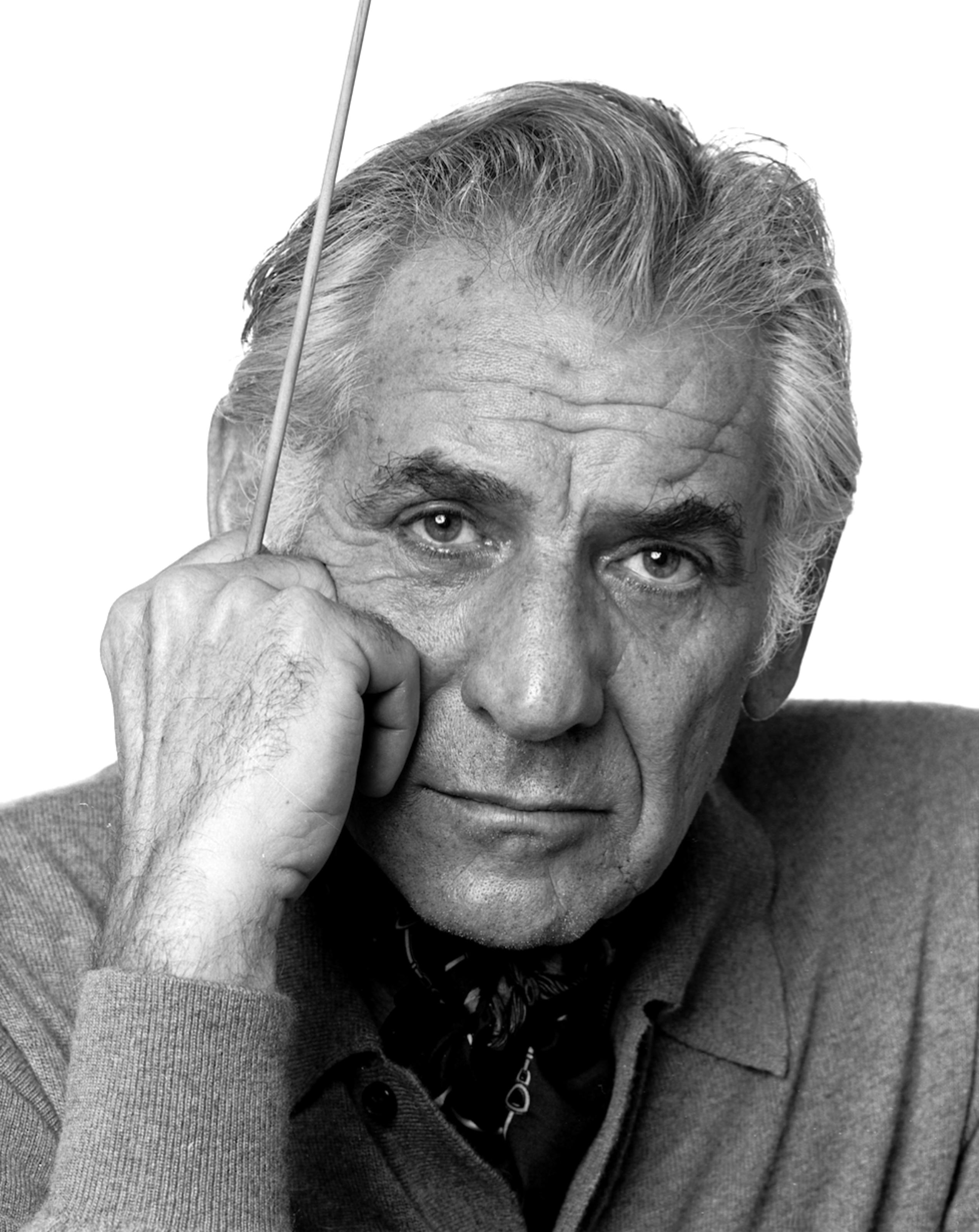
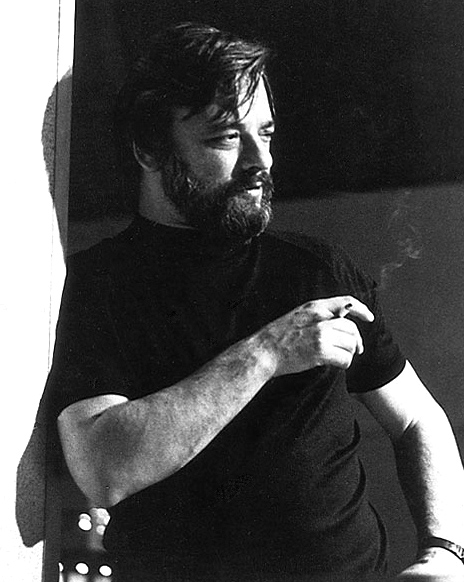
Leonard Bernstein (pictured in 1977; left) and Stephen Sondheim (pictured in 1976) wrote and produced the soundtrack to the 1961 film West Side Story, which would become the best performing album of 1962 and 1963 and be the longest reigning album atop the Billboard album chart.

The American Billboard magazine, publishes a weekly chart that ranks the highest-selling albums in the country. In 1962, the album chart was known as "Top LP's" and was divided between the mono format, with 150 chart positions and stereo with 50. In 1962, six mono and stereo albums topped the chart.

The first record to top the mono chart was the soundtrack to the 1961 film Blue Hawaii recorded by Elvis Presley. The soundtrack album reached the top in early December 1961 and stayed atop till late April for 20 consecutive weeks. In July 2002, it was certified three times platinum by the Recording Industry Association of America (RIAA). The soundtrack of the American film West Side Story (1961) replaced Blue Hawaii for seven weeks in May and June and for three additional weeks in September and October. Ray Charles' Modern Sounds in Country and Western Music replaced the aforementioned album and topped the chart for 14 consecutive weeks from June till September. The last number on the mono chart in the year was recorded by Vaughn Meader. His comedy album The First Family, which made fun of then-President, John F. Kennedy, topped the chart for the last three weeks in December.

On the stereo chart, Stereo 35/MM by Enoch Light & the Light Brigade could continue its reign which started in mid-November 1961. The album topped the chart in the first week of January, bringing its total to seven weeks atop. Presley's Blue Hawaii was also able to top the chart, but only for four nonconsecutive weeks. Henry Mancini's soundtrack Breakfast at Tiffany's for the film of the same name, spent twelve weeks atop, making it the second longest reigning album atop the stereo chart. West Side Story replaced it in May and topped the chart till May of the following year, for a total of 54 weeks, the longest ever. In August, Ray Charles' Modern Sounds in Country and Western Music, topped it for one week, bringing his total to 15 weeks in both charts.

Over 104 combined chart weeks, West Side Story was the best performing album of the year, spending a combined 53 weeks atop the chart. While, the album spent 53 weeks atop both charts in 1962, Billboard only recognizes the stereo chart as the predecessor of the modern Billboard 200, thus counting only its weeks for the record of most weeks spent on number one. Between May 1962 and May 1963, it spent 54 weeks atop the chart. Furthermore, West Side Story would go on to be the best-selling album on the year, moving some 2,5 million copies. It ultimately became the best-selling album of the 1960s in the US and was certified triple platinum by the RIAA. The album went on to win a Grammy in the category Grammy Award for Best Sound Track Album or Recording of Original Cast From a Motion Picture or Television in 1962.

== Chart history ==
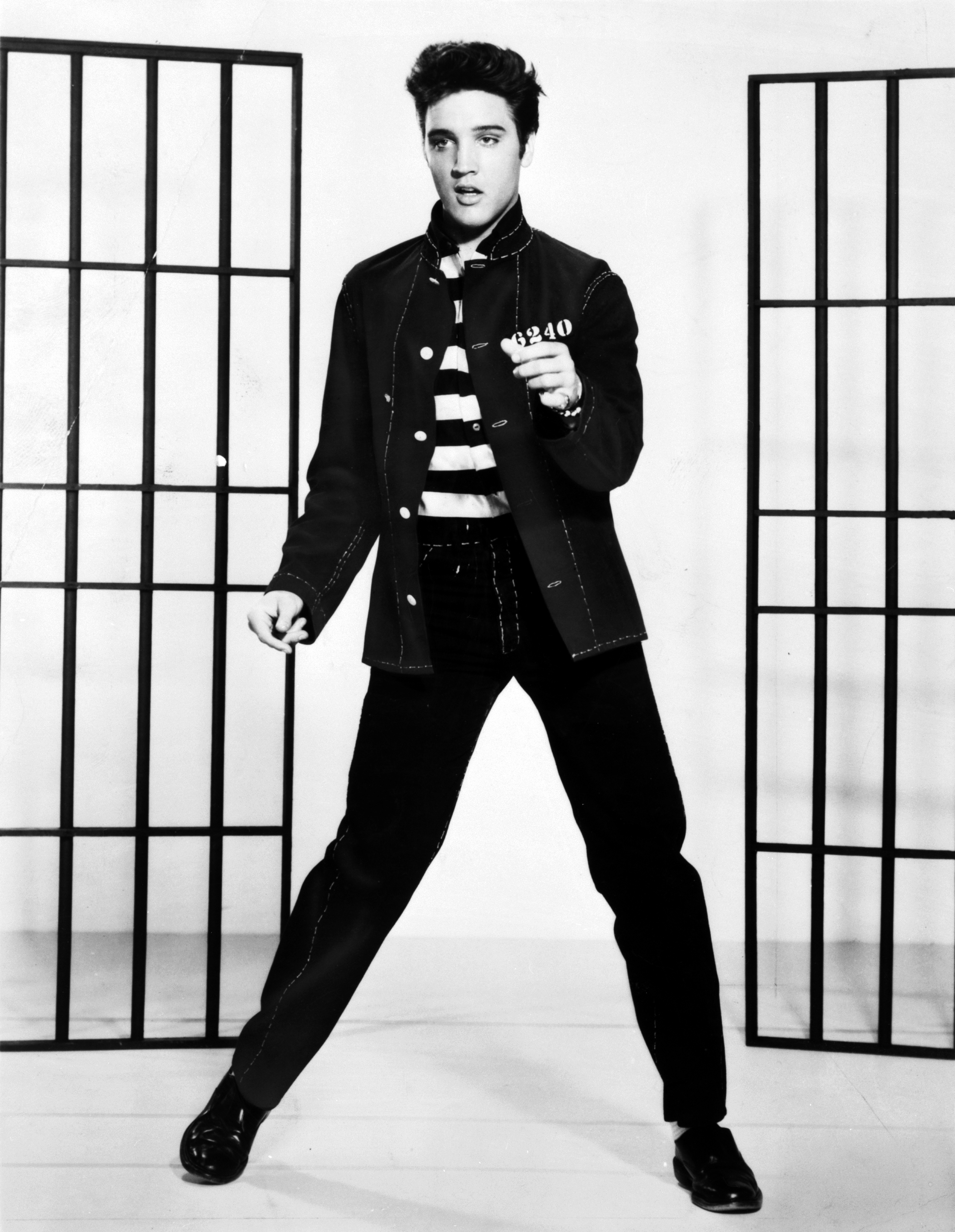
Elvis Presley's Blue Hawaii Soundtrack topped the monoaural chart for 37 and the stereo for 4 weeks.

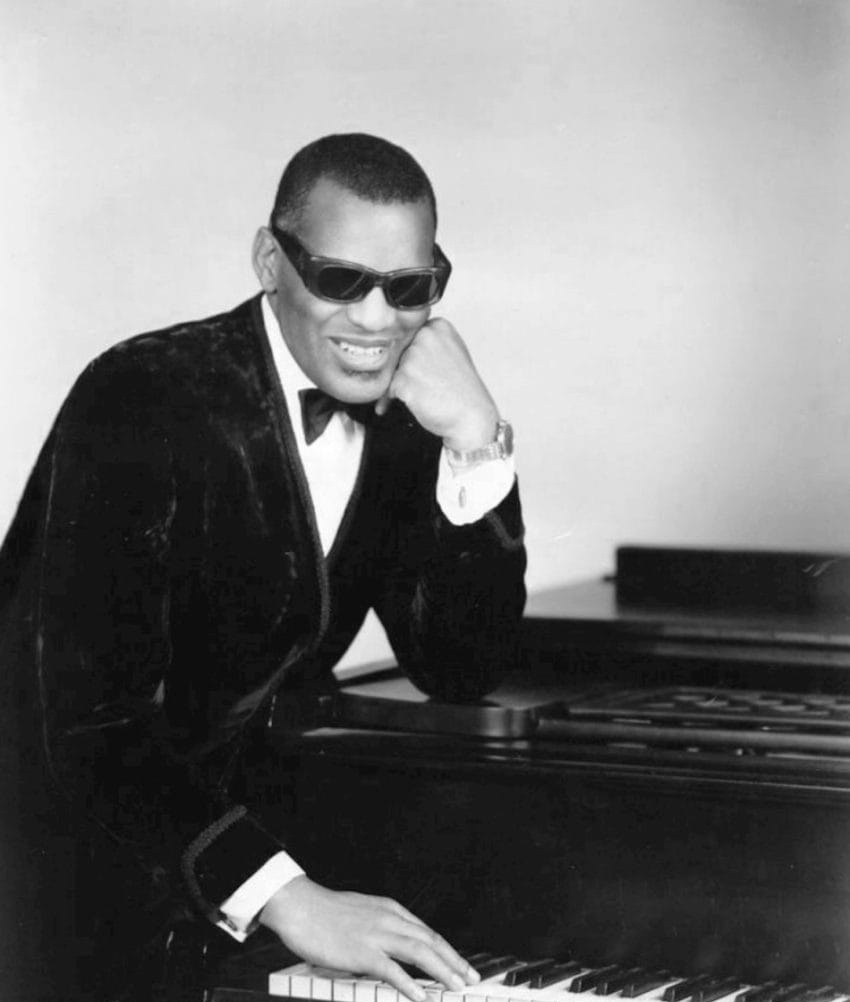
Ray Charles' Modern Sounds in Country and Western Music became his first album to top the chart and was certified gold by the RIAA.

Key
†	Indicates best performing album of 1962

Chart history
Issue date	Mono			Stereo			Ref.
Issue date	Album	Artist(s)	Label	Album	Artist(s)	Label	Ref.
January 6	Blue Hawaii	Elvis Presley / Soundtrack	RCA Victor	Stereo 35/MM	Enoch Light & the Light Brigade	Command	
January 13	Blue Hawaii	Elvis Presley / Soundtrack	RCA Victor	Holiday Sing Along with Mitch	Mitch Miller	Columbia	
January 20	Blue Hawaii	Elvis Presley / Soundtrack	RCA Victor	Blue Hawaii	Elvis Presley / Soundtrack	RCA Victor	
January 27	Blue Hawaii	Elvis Presley / Soundtrack	RCA Victor	Blue Hawaii	Elvis Presley / Soundtrack	RCA Victor	
February 3	Blue Hawaii	Elvis Presley / Soundtrack	RCA Victor	Blue Hawaii	Elvis Presley / Soundtrack	RCA Victor	
February 10	Blue Hawaii	Elvis Presley / Soundtrack	RCA Victor	Breakfast at Tiffany's	Henry Mancini / Soundtrack	RCA Victor	
February 17	Blue Hawaii	Elvis Presley / Soundtrack	RCA Victor	Breakfast at Tiffany's	Henry Mancini / Soundtrack	RCA Victor	
February 24	Blue Hawaii	Elvis Presley / Soundtrack	RCA Victor	Breakfast at Tiffany's	Henry Mancini / Soundtrack	RCA Victor	
March 3	Blue Hawaii	Elvis Presley / Soundtrack	RCA Victor	Breakfast at Tiffany's	Henry Mancini / Soundtrack	RCA Victor	
March 10	Blue Hawaii	Elvis Presley / Soundtrack	RCA Victor	Breakfast at Tiffany's	Henry Mancini / Soundtrack	RCA Victor	
March 17	Blue Hawaii	Elvis Presley / Soundtrack	RCA Victor	Breakfast at Tiffany's	Henry Mancini / Soundtrack	RCA Victor	
March 24	Blue Hawaii	Elvis Presley / Soundtrack	RCA Victor	Breakfast at Tiffany's	Henry Mancini / Soundtrack	RCA Victor	
March 31	Blue Hawaii	Elvis Presley / Soundtrack	RCA Victor	Breakfast at Tiffany's	Henry Mancini / Soundtrack	RCA Victor	
April 7	Blue Hawaii	Elvis Presley / Soundtrack	RCA Victor	Blue Hawaii	Elvis Presley / Soundtrack	RCA Victor	
April 14	Blue Hawaii	Elvis Presley / Soundtrack	RCA Victor	Breakfast at Tiffany's	Henry Mancini / Soundtrack	RCA Victor	
April 21	Blue Hawaii	Elvis Presley / Soundtrack	RCA Victor	Breakfast at Tiffany's	Henry Mancini / Soundtrack	RCA Victor	
April 28	Blue Hawaii	Elvis Presley / Soundtrack	RCA Victor	Breakfast at Tiffany's	Henry Mancini / Soundtrack	RCA Victor	
May 5	West Side Story †	Soundtrack	Columbia	Breakfast at Tiffany's	Henry Mancini / Soundtrack	RCA Victor	
May 12	West Side Story †	Soundtrack	Columbia	West Side Story †	Soundtrack	Columbia	
May 19	West Side Story †	Soundtrack	Columbia	West Side Story †	Soundtrack	Columbia	
May 26	West Side Story †	Soundtrack	Columbia	West Side Story †	Soundtrack	Columbia	
June 2	West Side Story †	Soundtrack	Columbia	West Side Story †	Soundtrack	Columbia	
June 9	West Side Story †	Soundtrack	Columbia	West Side Story †	Soundtrack	Columbia	
June 16	West Side Story †	Soundtrack	Columbia	West Side Story †	Soundtrack	Columbia	
June 23	Modern Sounds in Country and Western Music	Ray Charles	ABC/Paramount	West Side Story †	Soundtrack	Columbia	
June 30	Modern Sounds in Country and Western Music	Ray Charles	ABC/Paramount	West Side Story †	Soundtrack	Columbia	
July 7	Modern Sounds in Country and Western Music	Ray Charles	ABC/Paramount	West Side Story †	Soundtrack	Columbia	
July 14	Modern Sounds in Country and Western Music	Ray Charles	ABC/Paramount	West Side Story †	Soundtrack	Columbia	
July 21	Modern Sounds in Country and Western Music	Ray Charles	ABC/Paramount	West Side Story †	Soundtrack	Columbia	
July 28	Modern Sounds in Country and Western Music	Ray Charles	ABC/Paramount	West Side Story †	Soundtrack	Columbia	
August 4	Modern Sounds in Country and Western Music	Ray Charles	ABC/Paramount	West Side Story †	Soundtrack	Columbia	
August 11	Modern Sounds in Country and Western Music	Ray Charles	ABC/Paramount	Modern Sounds in Country and Western Music	Ray Charles	ABC/Paramount	
August 18	Modern Sounds in Country and Western Music	Ray Charles	ABC/Paramount	West Side Story †	Soundtrack	Columbia	
August 25	Modern Sounds in Country and Western Music	Ray Charles	ABC/Paramount	West Side Story †	Soundtrack	Columbia	
September 1	Modern Sounds in Country and Western Music	Ray Charles	ABC/Paramount	West Side Story †	Soundtrack	Columbia	
September 8	Modern Sounds in Country and Western Music	Ray Charles	ABC/Paramount	West Side Story †	Soundtrack	Columbia	
September 15	Modern Sounds in Country and Western Music	Ray Charles	ABC/Paramount	West Side Story †	Soundtrack	Columbia	
September 22	Modern Sounds in Country and Western Music	Ray Charles	ABC/Paramount	West Side Story †	Soundtrack	Columbia	
September 29	West Side Story †	Soundtrack	Columbia	West Side Story †	Soundtrack	Columbia	
October 6	West Side Story †	Soundtrack	Columbia	West Side Story †	Soundtrack	Columbia	
October 13	West Side Story †	Soundtrack	Columbia	West Side Story †	Soundtrack	Columbia	
October 20	Peter, Paul and Mary	Peter, Paul and Mary	Warner Bros.	West Side Story †	Soundtrack	Columbia	
October 27	Peter, Paul and Mary	Peter, Paul and Mary	Warner Bros.	West Side Story †	Soundtrack	Columbia	
November 3	Peter, Paul and Mary	Peter, Paul and Mary	Warner Bros.	West Side Story †	Soundtrack	Columbia	
November 10	Peter, Paul and Mary	Peter, Paul and Mary	Warner Bros.	West Side Story †	Soundtrack	Columbia	
November 17	Peter, Paul and Mary	Peter, Paul and Mary	Warner Bros.	West Side Story †	Soundtrack	Columbia	
November 24	Peter, Paul and Mary	Peter, Paul and Mary	Warner Bros.	West Side Story †	Soundtrack	Columbia	
December 1	My Son, the Folk Singer	Allan Sherman	Warner Bros.	West Side Story †	Soundtrack	Columbia	
December 8	My Son, the Folk Singer	Allan Sherman	Warner Bros.	West Side Story †	Soundtrack	Columbia	
December 15	The First Family	Vaughn Meader	Cadence	West Side Story †	Soundtrack	Columbia	
December 22	The First Family	Vaughn Meader	Cadence	West Side Story †	Soundtrack	Columbia	
December 29	The First Family	Vaughn Meader	Cadence	West Side Story †	Soundtrack	Columbia	

== See also ==
- 1962 in music
- List of number-one albums (United States)
