= 4th Annual Grammy Awards =

1962 US music awards ceremony

- Date: May 29, 1962
- Location: Chicago, Los Angeles and New York

Television/radio coverage
- Network: CBS

The 4th Annual Grammy Awards were held on May 29, 1962, at Chicago, Los Angeles and New York. They recognized accomplishments by musicians from the year 1961. Henry Mancini won 5 awards.

== Award winners ==
The following awards were given at the 1961 ceremony (winners in bold).

- Record of the Year
  - **Henry Mancini for "Moon River"**
  - Si Zentner for "Up A Lazy River"
  - Frank Sinatra for "The Second Time Around"
  - Dave Brubeck for "Take Five"
  - Jimmy Dean for "Big Bad John"
- Album of the Year (other than classical)
  - **Judy Garland for Judy at Carnegie Hall**
  - John Green for West Side Story (Motion Picture Soundtrack)
  - Nat King Cole for The Nat King Cole Story
  - Johnny Mann for Great Band With Great Voices performed by Si Zentner
  - Ray Charles for Genius + Soul = Jazz
  - Henry Mancini for Breakfast At Tiffany's
- Song of the Year
  - **Henry Mancini & Johnny Mercer (songwriters) for "Moon River" performed by Henry Mancini**
  - Betty Comden, Adolph Green & Jule Styne (songwriters) for "Make Someone Happy" performed by Perry Como
  - Tony Velona (songwriter) for "Lollipops And Roses" performed by Jack Jones
  - Jimmy Dean (songwriter) for "Big Bad John" performed by Jimmy Dean
  - Hank Cochran (songwriter) for "A Little Bitty Tear" performed by Burl Ives
- Best New Artist
  - **Peter Nero**
  - Timi Yuro
  - Dick Gregory
  - Ann-Margret
  - The Lettermen

=== Children's ===
- Best Recording for Children
  - **Leonard Bernstein (conductor) for Prokofiev: Peter and the Wolf performed by the New York Philharmonic Orchestra**
  - Young Abe Lincoln performed by Original Broadway Cast
  - Soupy Sales for The Soupy Sales Show
  - David Randolph & James Goodfriend (arrangers) Golden Treasury Of Great Music And Literature performed by Various Artists
  - George Bruns (composer) 101 Dalmatians performed by Various Artists

=== Classical ===
- Best Classical Performance - Orchestra
  - Charles Münch (conductor) & the Boston Symphony Orchestra for Ravel: Daphnis et Chloé
- Best Classical Performance - Vocal Soloist (with or without orchestra)
  - Francesco Molinari-Pradelli (conductor), Joan Sutherland & the Royal Opera House Orchestra for The Art of the Prima Donna
- Best Opera Recording
  - Gabriele Santini (conductor), Victoria de los Ángeles, Jussi Björling, Miriam Pirazzini, Mario Sereni & the Rome Opera Orchestra for Puccini: Madama Butterfly
- Best Classical Performance - Choral (other than opera)
  - Robert Shaw (choir director) & the Robert Shaw Orchestra & Chorale for Bach: B Minor Mass
- Best Classical Performance - Instrumental Soloist (with orchestra)
  - Eugene Ormandy (conductor), Isaac Stern & the Philadelphia Orchestra for Bartók: Violin Concerto No. 1
- Best Classical Performance - Instrumental Soloist or Duo (without orchestra)
  - Laurindo Almeida for Reverie for Spanish Guitar
- Best Classical Performance - Chamber Music
  - Jascha Heifetz, Gregor Piatigorsky & William Primrose for Beethoven: Serenade, Op. 8/Kodály: Duo for Violin and Cello, Op. 7
- Best Contemporary Classical Composition
  - Laurindo Almeida (composer and artist) for Discantus
  - Igor Stravinsky (composer and artist) for Stravinsky: Movements for Piano and Orchestra
- Album of the Year - Classical
  - Igor Stravinsky (conductor) & the Columbia Symphony Orchestra for Stravinsky Conducts 1960: Le Sacre du Printemps; Petrushka

=== Comedy ===
- Best Comedy Performance
  - **Elaine May & Mike Nichols for An Evening with Mike Nichols and Elaine May**
  - Stan Freberg for Stan Freberg Presents The United States Of America
  - Bill Dana for Jose Jimenez The Astronaut
  - Jonathan Winters Here's Jonathan
  - Carl Reiner & Mel Brooks for 2001 Years With Carl Reiner And Mel Brooks

=== Composing and arranging ===
- Best Instrumental Theme or Instrumental Version of Song
  - **Galt MacDermot for "African Waltz" performed by Cannonball Adderley**
  - Bob Merrill (composer) for "Theme From Carnival" performed by Original Broadway Cast
  - Dimitri Tiomkin (composer) for The Guns Of Navarone (Motion Picture) performed by Dimitri Tiomkin
  - Duke Ellington (composer) for Paris Blues performed by Duke Ellington
  - Nino Rota (composer) for La Dolce Vita performed by Nino Rota
- Best Sound Track Album or Recording of Score from Motion Picture or Television
  - **Henry Mancini (composer) for Breakfast at Tiffany's**
  - Dimitri Tiomkin (composer) for The Guns Of Navarone (Motion Picture) performed by Dimitri Tiomkin
  - Louis Armstrong & Duke Ellington for Paris Blues (Motion Picture) performed by Louis Armstrong & Duke Ellington
  - Nino Rota for La Dolce Vita (Motion Picture) performed by Nino Rota
  - John Williams for Checkmate performed by John Williams
- Best Arrangement
  - **Henry Mancini (arranger & artist) for "Moon River"**
  - Bob Florence (arranger) for "Up A Lazy River" performed by Si Zentner
  - J.J. Johnson (arranger) for "Perceptions" performed by Dizzy Gillespie
  - Peter Nero (arranger & performer) for New Piano In Town
  - George Russell (arranger) for "All About Rosie" performed by Gerry Mulligan

=== Country ===
- Best Country & Western Recording
  - **Jimmy Dean for "Big Bad John"**
  - LeRoy Van Dyke for "Walk On By"
  - Tex Ritter for "Hillbilly Heaven"
  - Faron Young for "Hello Walls"
  - Burl Ives for "A Little Bitty Tear"

=== Folk ===
- Best Folk Recording
  - **The Belafonte Folk Singers for Belafonte Folk Singers at Home and Abroad**
  - The Limeliters for The Slightly Fabulous Limeliters
  - The Clancy Brothers & Tommy Makem for The Clancy Brothers And Tommy Makem
  - Bill Broonzy for The Big Bill Broonzy Story
  - Alan Lomax for Folk Songs Of Britain Vol. I

=== Gospel ===
- Best Gospel or Other Religious Recording
  - **Mahalia Jackson for Everytime I Feel the Spirit**
  - The Staple Singers for Swing Low
  - Tex Ritter Lincoln Hymns
  - Alex Bradford for "Jesus Keep Me Near The Cross"
  - Tennessee Ernie Ford for Hymns At Home

=== Jazz ===
- Best Jazz Performance - Soloist or Small Group (Instrumental)
  - **André Previn for André Previn Plays Harold Arlen**
  - Al Hirt for The Greatest Horn In The World
  - Modern Jazz Quartet for European Concert
  - Erroll Garner for Dreamstreet
  - Bill Evans Trio for Bill Evans At The Village Vanguard
- Best Jazz Performance - Large Group (Instrumental)
  - **Stan Kenton for Kenton's West Side Story**
  - Gil Evans for Out Of The Cool
  - Dizzy Gillespie for Gillespiana
  - Count Basie And His Orchestra for Basie At Birdland
  - Andre Previn for A Touch Of Elegance
- Best Original Jazz Composition
  - **Galt MacDermot (composer) for "African Waltz" performed by Cannonball Adderley**
  - Dave Brubeck (composer) for "Unsquare Dance" performed by Dave Brubeck
  - J.J. Johnson (composer) for "Perceptions" performed by Dizzy Gillespie
  - Lalo Schifrin (composer) for Gillespiana performed by Dizzy Gillespie
  - Andre Previn (composer) for "A Touch Of Elegance" performed by Andre Previn

=== Musical show ===
- Best Original Cast Show Album
  - **Frank Loesser (composer) & the original cast with Robert Morse, Rudy Vallee, Charles Nelson Reilly, Bonnie Scott, Claudette Southerland & Sammy Smith for How to Succeed in Business Without Really Trying**
  - Cy Coleman & Carolyn Leigh (composers) for Wildcat performed by original cast including Lucille Ball
  - Jerry Herman (composer) for Milk And Honey performed by original cast including Robert Weede, Mimi Benzell, Molly Picon & Lanna Saunders
  - Betty Comden, Adolph Green & Jule Styne for Do Re Mi performed by original cast including Phil Silvers, Nancy Walker, John Reardon & Nancy Dussault
  - Bob Merrill (composer) for Carnival performed by original cast including Anna Maria Alberghetti, James Mitchell, Kaye Ballard, Pierre Olaf & Jerry Orbach
- Best Sound Track Album or Recording of Original Cast From a Motion Picture or Television
  - **Irwin Kostal, Johnny Green, Saul Chaplin, Sid Ramin (music directors) & the original cast for West Side Story**
  - Tutti Camarata (music director) for Parent Trap (Motion Picture) performed by original cast including Hayley Mills
  - Ken Darby & Alfred Newman (music directors) for Flower Drum Song (Motion Picture) performed by original cast
  - Elvis Presley (performer) for Blue Hawaii (Motion Picture)
  - Tutti Camarata (music director) for Babes in Toyland (Motion Picture) performed by original cast including Ann Jillian, Ed Wynn & Ray Bolger

=== Packaging and notes ===
- Best Album Cover - Classical
  - **Marvin Schwartz (art director) for Puccini: Madama Butterfly performed by the Rome Opera Orchestra conducted by Gabriele Santini**
  - Robert M. Jones (art director) for Gould: Ballet Music Fall River Legend Interplay, Latin American Symphonette conducted by Morton Gould
  - Meyer Miller (art director) for Golden Age Of English Lute Music performed by Julian Bream
  - Marvin Schwartz (art director) for Beethoven Nine Symphonies conducted by Otto Klemperer
  - Robert M. Jones (art director) for Albeniz Iberia/Ravel: Rapsodie Espagnole conducted by Jean Morel
- Best Album Cover - Other Than Classical
  - **Jim Silke (art director) for Judy at Carnegie Hall performed by Judy Garland**
  - Kenneth Deardoff (art director) for New Orleans - The Living Legend performed by Peter Bocage
  - Reid Miles (art director) for Jackie's Bag performed by Jackie McLean
  - Robert M. Jones (art director) for Breakfast At Tiffany's performed by Henry Mancini
  - Robert "Bob" Cato (art director) for A Touch Of Elegance performed by Andre Previn

=== Pop ===
- Best Solo Vocal Performance, Female
  - **Judy Garland for Judy at Carnegie Hall**
  - Billie Holiday for The Essential Billie Holiday (Carnegie Hall Concert)
  - Ella Fitzgerald for Mr. Paganini
  - Lena Horne for Lena At The Sands
  - Peggy Lee for Basin Street East
- Best Solo Vocal Performance, Male
  - **Jack Jones for "Lollipops and Roses"**
  - Steve Lawrence for "Portrait Of My Love"
  - Andy Williams for "Danny Boy"
  - Jimmy Dean for "Big Bad John"
  - Burl Ives for "A Little Bitty Tear"
- Best Performance by a Vocal Group
  - **Lambert, Hendricks & Ross for High Flying**
  - The Four Freshman for Voices In Fun
  - The Lettermen for "The Way You Look Tonight"
  - The Limeliters for The Slightly Fabulous Limeliters
  - The Kingston Trio for Close Up
- Best Performance by a Chorus
  - **Johnny Mann for Great Band With Great Voices performed by the Johnny Mann Singers and the Si Zentner Orchestra**
  - Norman Luboff Choir for This Is Norman Luboff
  - Pete King for "Hey, Look Me Over"
  - Belafonte Folk Singers for Belafonte Folk Singers At Home And Abroad
  - Roger Wagner Chorale for A Song At Twilight
- Best Performance by an Orchestra - for Dancing
  - **Si Zentner for Up a Lazy River**
  - Les Brown for The Lerner And Loewe Bandbook
  - Billy May & Glen Gray for "Shall We Swing?"
  - Henry Mancini for Mr. Lucky Goes Latin
  - Quincy Jones for I Dig Dancers
  - Lawrence Welk for Calcutta
- Best Performance by an Orchestra - for Other Than Dancing
  - **Henry Mancini for Breakfast at Tiffany's**
  - Stan Kenton for West Side Story
  - Al Hirt for The Greatest Horn In The World
  - Andre Previn for A Touch Of Elegance
  - Gerry Mulligan for A Concert In Jazz
- Best Rock and Roll Recording
  - **Chubby Checker for "Let's Twist Again"**
  - The Tokens for "The Lion Sleeps Tonight"
  - Ike & Tina Turner for "It's Gonna Work Out Fine"
  - Chris Kenner for "I Like It Like That"
  - James Darren for "Goodbye Cruel World"

=== Production and engineering ===
- Best Engineering Contribution - Popular Recording
  - **Robert Arnold (engineer) for Judy at Carnegie Hall performed by Judy Garland**
  - Robert Fine (engineer) for Stereo 35/MM performed by Enoch Light
  - Al Schmitt (engineer) for Great Band With Great Voices performed by Johnny Mann Singers & Si Zentner
  - Bill MacMeekin (engineer) for Cozy performed by Steve Lawrence & Eydie Gorme
  - Al Schmitt (engineer) for Breakfast At Tiffany's performed by Henry Mancini
- Best Engineering Contribution - Classical Recording
  - **Lewis W. Layton (engineer), Charles Münch (conductor) & the Boston Symphony Orchestra for Ravel: Daphnis et Chloé**
  - Heinrich Keilholtz (engineer) for R. Strauss: Elektra conducted by Karl Bohm
  - Chris Parker (engineer) for Prokofiev Piano Concerto No. 3 conducted by Erich Leinsdorf with piano by John Browning
  - Walter Ruhlmann & Paul Vavasseur (engineers) for Poulenc: Concerto In G For Organ, Strings And Timpani conducted by Georges Pretre with organ by Maurice Durufle
  - Robert Fine (engineer) for Brahms: Symphony No. 2 conducted by William Steinberg
- Best Engineering Contribution - Novelty
  - **John Kraus (engineer) for Stan Freberg Presents the United States of America performed by Stan Freberg**
  - Rafael O. Valentin (engineer) for X-15 And Other Sounds Of Rockets, Missiles And Jets
  - Eddie Brackett (engineer) for The Soupy Sales Show performed by Soupy Sales
  - Ted Keep (engineer) for The Alvin Show performed by David Seville
  - Bruno Vineis (engineer) for Cartoons In Stereo effects by Bob Prescott

=== R&B ===
- Best Rhythm & Blues Performance
  - **Ray Charles for "Hit the Road Jack"**
  - LaVerne Baker for Saved
  - Ernie K-Doe for "Mother In Law"
  - Etta James for "Fool That I Am"
  - Jimmy Reed for "Bright Lights, Big City"

=== Spoken ===
- Best Documentary or Spoken Word Recording (other than comedy)
  - **Leonard Bernstein for Humor in Music**
  - Various artists for Wisdom: Conversations With The Elder Wise Men Of Our Day Vol. 1
  - Dorothy Parker for The World Of Dorothy Parker
  - Alexander Scourby & Robert Russell Bennett for The Coming Of Christ
  - Hal Holbrook for More Of Hal Holbrook In Mark Twain Tonight!
