= Put Your Head on My Shoulder =

Put Your Head on My Shoulder may refer to:

- "Put Your Head on My Shoulder" (song), a 1959 song by Paul Anka, covered by The Lettermen in 1963
- Put Your Head on My Shoulder (album), a 1966 swing album by Si Zentner & his orchestra
- Put Your Head on My Shoulder (TV series), Chinese drama based on novel by Zhao Qianqian of the same name

== See also ==
- "Put Your Head on My Shoulders", episode seven in the second production season of Futurama
- "Don't Talk (Put Your Head on My Shoulder)", a song written by Brian Wilson and Tony Asher for the American rock band The Beach Boys from the album Pet Sounds
