= Blue Hawaii (soundtrack) =

Soundtrack album by Elvis Presley
- Released: October 20, 1961
- Recorded: March 21–23, 1961
- Studio: Radio Recorders (Hollywood)
- Genre: Pop
- Length: 32:02
- Label: RCA Victor
- Producer: Steve Sholes

Elvis Presley chronology
Something for Everybody (1961)	Blue Hawaii (1961)	Follow That Dream (1962)

Singles from Blue Hawaii
- 1. "Can't Help Falling in Love" / "Rock-A-Hula Baby" Released: November 21, 1961

Professional ratings
Review scores
Source	Rating
AllMusic	3/5 stars
MusicHound	3/5 stars
The Rolling Stone Album Guide	3/5 stars
Rough Guides	3/5 stars
Uncut	2/5 stars

Blue Hawaii is the fourth soundtrack album by the American singer Elvis Presley, released by RCA Victor in mono and stereo on October 20, 1961. It is the soundtrack to the 1961 film Blue Hawaii starring Presley. In the United States, the album spent 20 weeks at the number one slot and 39 weeks in the Top 10 on Billboard's Top Pop LPs chart. It was certified Gold on December 21, 1961, Platinum and 2× Platinum on March 27, 1992, and 3× Platinum on July 30, 2002, by the Recording Industry Association of America. In the UK, the album spent 18 weeks at No. 1 on the Record Retailers (RR) album chart. On the US Top Pop Albums chart, Blue Hawaii is second only to West Side Story as the most successful soundtrack album of the 1960s.

== Content ==
RCA and Presley's manager, Colonel Tom Parker, had initially planned a schedule of one soundtrack and one popular music release per year for Presley, in addition to four singles. To reflect the location of the film, touches of Hawaiian music were included, from instrumentation to the traditional song "Aloha 'Oe".

The title song "Blue Hawaii" was taken from the 1937 Bing Crosby film Waikiki Wedding, and "Hawaiian Wedding Song" dates from a 1926 operetta.

The song "No More" is based on the melody of the Spanish song "La paloma", "Almost Always True" on the Quebecois song "Alouette", and "Can't Help Falling in Love" on the eighteenth-century French song "Plaisir d'amour".

Recording sessions took place at Radio Recorders in Hollywood on March 21, 22, and 23, 1961. The songs "Can't Help Falling in Love" and "Rock-A-Hula Baby" were pulled off the album for two sides of a single released on November 21, 1961. The A-side "Can't Help Falling in Love", which became the standard closer for a Presley concert in the 1970s, went to number two on the Billboard Hot 100, while the B-side charted independently at number 23.

== Reception ==
Blue Hawaii was nominated for a Grammy Award in 1961 in the category of Best Sound Track Album or Recording of Original Cast from a Motion Picture or Television.

The success of this soundtrack and its predecessor G. I. Blues, both of which sold in much greater quantity than Presley's recent released albums Elvis Is Back! and Something for Everybody, set the pace for the rest of the decade. Parker and Presley would focus almost exclusively on film work for much of the 1960s.

== Reissues ==
Blue Hawaii was reissued on compact disc in 1997 and again in 2008. The latter edition was a deluxe two-disc release on the Follow That Dream label that featured numerous alternate takes. It also corrected the error with the 1997 issue that incorrectly reversed the stereo channels. Five songs from this album appear on the 1995 compendium soundtrack box set Command Performances: The Essential 60s Masters II: "Can't Help Falling in Love", "Rock-A-Hula Baby", "Blue Hawaii", "Hawaiian Wedding Song", and "Beach Boy Blues".

== Track listing ==
=== Original release ===
Side one
No.	Title	Writer(s)	Recording date	Length
1.	"Blue Hawaii"	Leo Robin and Ralph Rainger	March 22, 1961	2:36
2.	"Almost Always True"	Ben Weisman and Fred Wise	March 22, 1961	2:25
3.	"Aloha ʻOe"	Queen Liliʻuokalani	March 21, 1961	1:53
4.	"No More"	Don Robertson, Hal Blair, Sebastián Iradier	March 21, 1961	2:22
5.	"Can't Help Falling in Love"	George David Weiss, Hugo Peretti and Luigi Creatore	March 23, 1961	3:01
6.	"Rock-A-Hula Baby"	Ben Weisman, Fred Wise, Dolores Fuller	March 23, 1961	1:59
7.	"Moonlight Swim"	Ben Weisman and Sylvia Dee	March 22, 1961	2:20

Side two
No.	Title	Writer(s)	Recording date	Length
8.	"Ku-U-I-Po"	George David Weiss, Hugo Peretti, and Luigi Creatore	March 21, 1961	2:23
9.	"Ito Eats"	Sid Tepper and Roy C. Bennett	March 22, 1961	1:23
10.	"Slicin' Sand"	Sid Tepper and Roy C. Bennett	March 21, 1961	1:36
11.	"Hawaiian Sunset"	Sid Tepper and Roy C. Bennett	March 21, 1961	2:32
12.	"Beach Boy Blues"	Sid Tepper and Roy C. Bennett	March 23, 1961	2:03
13.	"Island of Love"	Sid Tepper and Roy C. Bennett	March 22, 1961	2:41
14.	"Hawaiian Wedding Song"	Al Hoffman, Charles E. King, Dick Manning	March 22, 1961	2:48

=== 1997 reissue ===
On April 29, 1997, RCA released a remastered and expanded version for compact disc. Tracks 1–7 were the seven songs from side one of the original LP and tracks 8–14 were from side two. Tracks 15–22 are bonus tracks, all of which had been recorded during the original album sessions and were previously unreleased except for "Steppin' Out of Line" which had originally appeared on the LP Pot Luck with Elvis (1962).

No.	Title	Writer(s)	Recording date	Length
15.	"Steppin' Out of Line" (originally issued on the Pot Luck With Elvis LP)	Ben Weisman, Fred Wise, Dolores Fuller	March 22, 1961	1:53
16.	"Can't Help Falling in Love" (movie version)	George David Weiss, Hugo Peretti, Luigi Creatore	March 23, 1961	1:54
17.	"Slicin' Sand" (alternate take 4)	Sid Tepper and Roy C. Bennett	March 21, 1961	1:45
18.	"No More" (alternate take 7)	Don Robertson, Hal Blair and Sebastián Iradier	March 21, 1961	2:35
19.	"Rock-A-Hula Baby" (alternate take 1)	Ben Weisman, Fred Wise, Dolores Fuller	March 23, 1961	2:15
20.	"Beach Boy Blues" (movie version)	Sid Tepper and Roy C. Bennett	March 23, 1961	1:58
21.	"Steppin' Out of Line" (movie version)	Ben Weisman, Fred Wise, Dolores Fuller	March 22, 1961	1:54
22.	"Blue Hawaii" (alternate take 3)	Leo Robin and Ralph Rainger	March 22, 1961	2:40

=== 2008 Blue Hawaii CD reissue ===
The Original Album
No.	Title	Length
1.	"Blue Hawaii"	2:37
2.	"Almost Always True"	2:24
3.	"Aloha Oe"	1:55
4.	"No More"	2:24
5.	"Can't Help Falling In Love"	3:04
6.	"Rock-A-Hula Baby"	2:01
7.	"Moonlight Swim"	2:22
8.	"Ku-U-I-Po"	2:23
9.	"Ito Eats"	1:25
10.	"Slicin' Sand"	1:37
11.	"Hawaiian Sunset"	2:35
12.	"Beach Boy Blues"	2:05
13.	"Island Of Love"	2:41
14.	"Hawaiian Wedding Song"	2:53

New Bonus Tracks
No.	Title	Length
15.	"Steppin' Out Of Line" (movie version)	1:56
16.	"Beach Boy Blues" (movie version)	1:59
17.	"Can't Help Falling In Love" (movie version)	1:54
18.	"Moonlight Swim" (undubbed master)	2:25
19.	"Steppin' Out Of Line" (record version)	1:57

First Takes
No.	Title	Length
20.	"Blue Hawaii" (takes 1,2,3)	3:54
21.	"Almost Always True" (take 3)	2:33
22.	"Aloha Oe" ([section 2] take 1)	1:20
23.	"No More" (take 7)	2:36
24.	"Can't Help Falling In Love" (take 13)	2:38
25.	"Rock-A-Hula Baby" (takes 1, 2, 3)	3:41
26.	"Moonlight Swim" (take 2)	2:38
27.	"Ku-U-I-Po" (take 1)	2:34
28.	"Ito Eats" (takes 1, 2)	2:36
29.	"Slicin' Sand" (takes 1, 2, 3)	2:59
30.	"Hawaiian Sunset" (take 1)	2:42
31.	"Island Of Love" (take 8)	3:02
32.	"Hawaiian Wedding Song" (take 1)	3:00

Alternate Takes
No.	Title	Length
1.	"Hawaiian Sunset" (take 2)	2:46
2.	"Hawaiian Sunset" (takes 6, 3)	3:18
3.	"Aloha Oe" ([section 2] take 6)	1:19
4.	"Aloha Oe" ([section 2] takes 7/5)	0:55
5.	"Ku-U-I-Po" (takes 2, 4, 5)	3:55
6.	"Ku-U-I-Po" (takes 6, 7)	2:51
7.	"No More" (takes 1, 2, 4, 8)	6:15
8.	"No More" (takes 11, 15 [insert ending])	3:16
9.	"Slicin' Sand" (take 4)	1:43
10.	"Slicin' Sand" (takes 5, 6, 7)	3:32
11.	"Slicin Sand" (takes 8, 13, 15, 16, 14)	4:06
12.	"Blue Hawaii" (takes 4, 5, 6)	4:39
13.	"Ito Eats" (takes 4, 6, 5)	2:21
14.	"Island Of Love" (takes 1, 2, 4, 6)	4:31
15.	"Island Of Love" (takes 7, 9)	3:16
16.	"Steppin' Out Of Line" ([movie version] takes 4, 5, 7/8)	3:22
17.	"Steppin' Out Of Line" ([record version] takes 10, 11, 16, 15)	4:08
18.	"Steppin' Out Of Line" ([tag for movie] takes 18/19)	1:15
19.	"Always Almost True" (takes 2, 4, 5)	5:11
20.	"Almost Always True" (takes 7, 6)	2:52
21.	"Moonlight Swim" (takes 1, 4)	3:54
22.	"Can't Help Falling In Love" (takes 14, 15, 16)	3:08
23.	"Can't Help Falling In Love" (takes 17, 19, 20, 21, 22, 24)	4:27
24.	"Can't Help Falling In Love" (takes 25, 26)	2:15

== Personnel ==
Sourced from Keith Flynn's analysis of RCA and AFM paperwork.

- Elvis Presley – lead vocals
- The Jordanaires – backing vocals, acoustic guitar, ukulele
- The Surfers – backing vocals
- Loulie Jean Norman, Dorothy McCarty, Virginia Rees, Jackie Allen – overdubbed backing vocals on "Moonlight Swim"
- Scotty Moore – electric guitar
- Hank Garland – electric guitar
- Tiny Timbrell – acoustic guitar
- Floyd Cramer – piano
- Dudley Brooks – piano, celeste
- Bob Moore – double bass
- D.J. Fontana – drums
- Bernie Mattinson – drums, percussion
- Hal Blaine – drums, percussion
- Boots Randolph – saxophone
- George Field – harmonica
- Freddie Tavares – ukulele
- Bernie Lewis – ukulele
- Alvino Rey – pedal steel guitar

== Charts ==
Chart (1962–1977)	Peak position
Australia (Kent Music Report)	63
German Albums (Offizielle Top 100)	17
Italian Albums (HitParadeItalia)	1
New Zealand Albums (RMNZ)	39
Swedish Albums (Sverigetopplistan)	46
UK Albums (OCC)	1
US Billboard 200	1

== Certifications ==
Region	Certification	Certified units/sales
Canada (Music Canada)	Gold	50,000^{^}
United States (RIAA)	3× Platinum	3,000,000^{^}
^{^} Shipments figures based on certification alone.

== Awards ==
Year	Award type	Categories	Results	Ref.
1962	Grammy Awards	Best Sound Track Album or Recording of Original Cast From a Motion Picture or Television	Nominated	

== See also ==
- List of Billboard 200 number-one albums of 1961
- List of Billboard 200 number-one albums of 1962
- List of UK Albums Chart number ones of the 1960s
