= Can-Can (soundtrack) =

Soundtrack album by various artists
- Released: 1960
- Label: Capitol

Cole Porter's Can-Can – Original Soundtrack Album, or just Can-Can, is an album featuring the original soundtrack to the 1960 20th Century–Fox motion picture Can-Can, with music by Cole Porter arranged and conducted by Nelson Riddle.

== Release ==
The album was released on LP in both mono (cat. no. W-1301) and stereo (cat. no. SW-1301) versions.

== Critical reception ==
Professional ratings
Review scores
Source	Rating
AllMusic	3/5 stars

In his retrospective review for AllMusic, Nick Dedina wrote: "Can-Can is neither the best Frank Sinatra movie musical out there nor his best soundtrack, which is disappointing considering that the source Cole Porter songs are so strong. Still, the [album] does have its charms and features Sinatra's definitive, wrist-slashing interpretation of 'It's All Right with Me'."

== Track listing ==
LP – Capitol W-1301 (mono), SW-1301 (stereo)

Side 1
No.	Title	Artist(s)	Length
1.	"Entr'acte"	Orchestra	3:19
2.	"It's All Right with Me"	Frank Sinatra	4:12
3.	"Come Along with Me"	Shirley MacLaine	2:02
4.	"Live and Let Live"	Maurice Chevalier and Louis Jourdan	1:49
5.	"You Do Something to Me"	Louis Jourdan	1:55
6.	"Let's Do It"	Frank Sinatra and Shirley MacLaine	2:45

Side 2
No.	Title	Artist(s)	Length
1.	"Main title" "I Love Paris" "Montmart'"	Orchestra; Chorus; Frank Sinatra, Maurice Chevalier and Chorus	3:00
2.	"C'est Magnifique"	Frank Sinatra	1:59
3.	"Maidens Typical of France"	Chorus and Orchestra	3:03
4.	"Just One of Those Things"	Maurice Chevalier	2:07
5.	"I Love Paris"	Frank Sinatra and Maurice Chevalier	2:20
6.	"Can-Can"	Orchestra	3:17

== Awards ==
Year	Award type	Categories	Results	Ref.
1961	Grammy Awards	Best Sound Track Album or Recording of Original Cast from a Motion Picture or Television	Won	
