= How to Succeed in Business Without Really Trying (original Broadway cast recording) =

Cast recording by the original cast
- Released: 1961
- Genre: Show tunes
- Label: RCA Victor

How to Succeed in Business Without Really Trying, subtitled The Original Broadway Cast Recording, is an album containing a recording of the 1961 Broadway musical How to Succeed in Business Without Really Trying made by its original cast. The album was released by RCA Victor on November 1, 1961.

== Critical reception ==
Professional ratings
Review scores
Source	Rating
Billboard	(positive)

Billboard picked the album for its "Spotlight" section. The magazine's reviewer noted that the musical was "easily one of the hottest shows to break since My Fair Lady" and concluded: "All the best ingredients are right here, including a highly tuneful score. This one can hardly miss."

== Commercial performance ==
The album peaked at number 19 on the mono and number 49 on the stereo half of Billboard's Top LPs chart in January 1962.

On June 2, 1962, Billboard mentioned the album as "hav[ing] passed the 200,000 [sales] mark".

== Track listing ==
LP – RCA Victor LOC-1066 (mono), LSO-1066 (stereo)

All lyrics are written by Frank Loesser; all music is composed by Frank Loesser.

Side 1
No.	Title	Artist(s)	Length
1.	"Overture"; "How To"	Orchestra; Robert Morse	3:42
2.	"Happy to Keep His Dinner Warm"	Bonnie Scott	2:32
3.	"Coffee Break"	Charles Nelson Reilly; Claudette Sutherland; company	2:37
4.	"The Company Way"	Robert Morse; Sammy Smith; Charles Nelson Reilly; company	4:10
5.	"A Secretary Is Not a Toy"	Paul Reed; company	3:58
6.	"Been a Long Day"	Robert Morse; Bonnie Scott; Claudette Sutherland	3:02
7.	"Grand Old Ivy"	Robert Morse; Rudy Vallee	2:13

Side 2
No.	Title	Artist(s)	Length
1.	"Paris Original"	Bonnie Scott; Claudette Sutherland; Mara Landi; company	3:42
2.	"Rosemary"	Robert Morse; Bonnie Scott; Charles Nelson Reilly	5:10
3.	"Cinderella, Darling"	Claudette Sutherland; company	3:46
4.	"Love from a Heart of Gold"	Rudy Vallee; Virginia Martin	2:51
5.	"I Believe in You"	Robert Morse; company	3:57
6.	"Brotherhood of Man"	Robert Morse; Sammy Smith; Ruth Kobart; company	4:02
7.	"Finale"	Bonnie Scott; company	2:00

== Personnel ==
- Original Broadway cast
- Elliot Lawrence – musical conductor

== Charts ==
Chart (1962)	Peak position
US Billboard Top LPs – 150 Best Selling Monaural LPs	19
US Billboard Top LPs – 50 Best Selling Stereo LPs	49

== Awards ==
Year	Award type	Categories	Results	Ref.
1962	Grammy Awards	Best Original Cast Show Album	Won	
