= Gigi (soundtrack) =

Soundtrack album
- Released: 1958
- Label: MGM

Professional ratings
Review scores
Source	Rating
Billboard	positive ("Spotlight" pick)
AllMusic	5/5 stars

The original soundtrack to the 1958 film Gigi was released in the same year on MGM Records. It was the first-ever stereo tape release on the label.

Billboard reviewed the album in its issue from 17 March 1958, calling it a "potent item" and commending its "powerful cover design" that added to the "overall appeal". Moreover, the magazine chose the album's cover as the Album Cover of the Week.

The album reached the top five on Billboard's Best Selling LPs chart.

== Track listing ==
12-inch LP (MGM Records E 3641 ST, SE 3451 ST)

Side 1
No.	Title	Artist(s)	Length
1.	"Overture"	M-G-M Studio Orchestra
2.	"Thank Heaven for Little Girls"	Maurice Chevalier
3.	"It's a Bore"	Maurice Chevalier and Louis Jourdan
4.	"The Parisians"	Leslie Caron
5.	"Waltz at Maxim's (She Is Not Thinking of Me)"	M-G-M Studio Orchestra
6.	"The Night They Invented Champagne"	Leslie Caron, Louis Jourdan and Hermione Gingold

Side 2
No.	Title	Artist(s)	Length
1.	"I Remember It Well"	Maurice Chevalier and Hermione Gingold
2.	"Say a Prayer for Me Tonight"	Leslie Caron
3.	"I'm Glad I'm Not Young Anymore"	Maurice Chevalier
4.	"Gigi (Gaston's Soliloquy)"	Louis Jourdan
5.	"Finale. Thank Heaven for Little Girls"	Maurice Chevalier

== Awards ==
Year	Award type	Categories	Results	Ref.
1959	Grammy Awards	Best Sound Track Album, Dramatic Picture Score or Original Cast	Won	
