= Miriam Pirazzini =

Italian mezzo-soprano

Miriam Pirazzini (photo with dedication from 1952).

Miriam Pirazzini (21 August 1918 – 26 December 2016) was an Italian mezzo-soprano and occasionally soprano. She made her formal debut in Rome, in 1944, as Laura Adorno in La Gioconda. For the next twenty years, she was one of Italy's foremost mezzo-sopranos.

Pirazzini was born in Castelfranco Veneto, Treviso, Veneto in 1918. Opposite Maria Callas, Pirazzini appeared as Amneris in Aïda, at Rovigo (1948), Reggio Calabria (1951) and the Verona Arena (directed by G.W. Pabst, 1953); in the oratorio San Giovanni Battista at Perugia (1949); as Azucena in Il trovatore at the Teatro dell'Opera, Rome (1953); and Neris in Medea (the Italian version of Luigi Cherubini's Médée) in Venice (1953), as well as on the first studio recording of Cherubini's masterpiece. She was also the Adalgisa (replacing the indisposed Fedora Barbieri) in the infamous Norma at Rome in 1958, when the performance was cancelled after Callas sang Act I and felt unable to continue; she kept the role partnering Anita Cerquetti, who replaced Callas for the remaining performances.

She appeared at the Teatro alla Scala in 1951, as Maffio Orsini in Lucrezia Borgia, opposite Caterina Mancini, Mirto Picchi, and Nicola Rossi Lemeni.

Another of Pirazzini's roles was of the Princesse de Bouillon in Adriana Lecouvreur, which she often sang with Magda Olivero in the title role, in Brescia (1956), Lisbon (1956), Palermo (1959) and Caracas (1961). In 1962, her recording of Suzuki in Madama Butterfly won a Grammy Award. She died in Rome on 26 December, 2016, at the age of 98.

== Studio Discography ==
- Cherubini: Medea (Callas, Scotto, Picchi, Modesti; Serafin, 1957) Ricordi/EMI
- Ponchielli: La Gioconda (Corridori, Campora, Colzani; Parodi, 1952) Urania
- Puccini: Madama Butterfly (de los Ángeles, Björling, Sereni; Santini, 1959) EMI
- Verdi: Aïda (Curtis-Verna, Corelli, Guelfi, Neri; Questa, 1956) Cetra
- Verdi: La forza del destino (Guerrini, Campora, Colzani, Corena; Parodi, p. 1952) Urania
- Verdi: I lombardi (Vitale, Bertocci; Wolf-Ferrari, 1951) Cetra
- Verdi: Otello (Rysanek, Vickers, Gobbi; Serafin, 1960) RCA
- Verdi: Rigoletto (d'Angelo, Tucker, Capecchi; Molinari-Pradelli, 1959) Philips
- Verdi: Il trovatore (Mancini, Lauri-Volpi, Tagliabue; Previtali, 1951) Cetra
