= Grammy Award for Best Sound Track Album or Recording of Original Cast from a Motion Picture or Television =

Music award category

Grammy Award for Best Sound Track Album or Recording of Original Cast From a Motion Picture or Television
- Awarded for: quality soundtrack albums or cast recordings
- Country: United States
- Presented by: National Academy of Recording Arts and Sciences
- First award: 1959
- Final award: 1962
- Website: grammy.com

The Grammy Award for Best Sound Track Album or Recording of Original Cast From a Motion Picture or Television was awarded from 1959 to 1962. The award has had several minor name changes:

- In 1959 the award was known as Best Sound Track Album, Dramatic Picture Score or Original Cast
- Also in 1959, on its second edition, it was awarded as Best Sound Track Album, Original Cast - Motion Picture or Television
- From 1961 to 1962 it was awarded as Best Sound Track Album or Recording of Original Cast From a Motion Picture or Television

Years reflect the year in which the Grammy Awards were handed out, for music released in the previous year.

== Nominated list ==
| Year | Winner(s) | Album | Nominees |
|---|---|---|---|
| 1959 | André Previn | Gigi | Auntie Mame Sound Track — Ray Heindorf; The Bridge on the River Kwai — Malcolm Arnold; I Want to Live! — Johnny Mandel; South Pacific — Alfred Newman |
| 1959 | André Previn & Ken Darby | Porgy and Bess | For the First Time — Mario Lanza |
| 1961 | Cole Porter | Can-Can | Bells Are Ringing — Betty Comden, Jule Styne & Adolph Green; G.I. Blues — Elvis Presley; Li'l Abner — Nelson Riddle |
| 1962 | Irwin Kostal, Johnny Green, Saul Chaplin & Sid Ramin | West Side Story | Babes in Toyland — Tutti Camarata; Blue Hawaii — Elvis Presley; Flower Drum Song — Alfred Newman & Ken Darby; The Parent Trap — Tutti Camarata |
