= Put Your Head on My Shoulder (album) =

Put Your Head On My Shoulder

Studio album by Si Zentner & His Orchestra
- Released: 1966
- Genre: Swing jazz
- Length: 31:55
- Label: RCA Victor Records
- Producer: Al Schmitt

Put Your Head On My Shoulder is a swing album released by Si Zentner & his orchestra in 1966 on RCA Victor LPM/LSP-3484.

== Track listing ==
1. "Fly Me to the Moon (In Other Words)"
2. "You Were Meant for Me"
3. "Don't Blame Me"
4. "My Devotion"
5. "Because of You"
6. "Be My Love"
7. "Dream On Little Dreamer"
8. "Soft Sound of Love"
9. "Put Your Head On My Shoulder"
10. "All I Do Is Dream of You"
11. "I'm Confessin' (That I Love You)"
12. "You're Nobody 'Til Somebody Loves You"
