= Si Zentner =

American jazz trombonist (1917–2000)

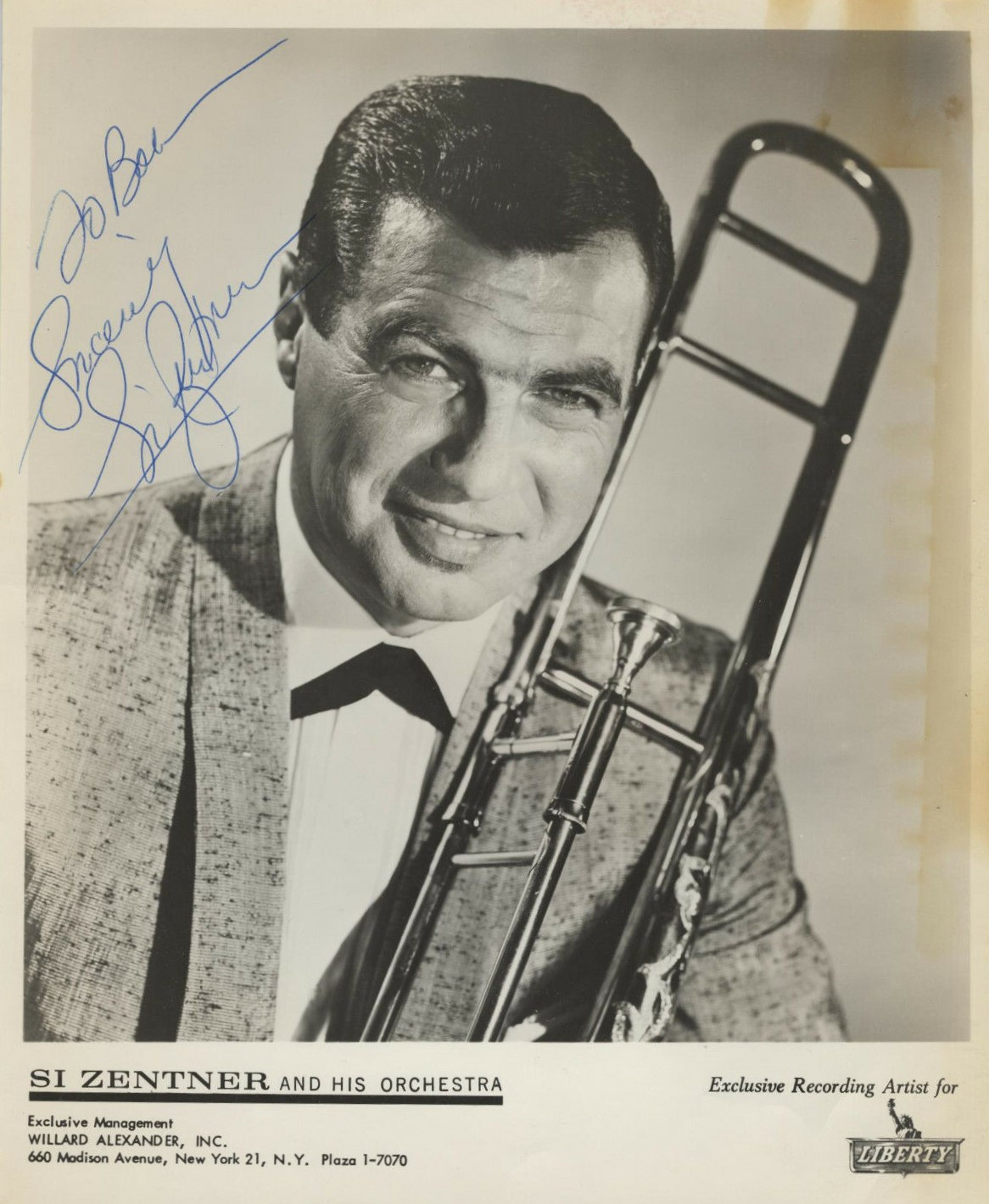
Zentner, c. 1965

Simon Hugh Zentner (June 13, 1917 – January 31, 2000) was an American jazz trombonist and big-band leader.

Zentner was born in New York City, United States. He played in the bands of Les Brown, Harry James, and Jimmy Dorsey in the 1940s, then moved to Los Angeles, where he worked as a studio musician. He also landed a job with MGM from 1949 to the mid-50s, and was involved in the music for films such as Singin' in the Rain and A Star Is Born.

The Zentner band began recording for Liberty Records in 1959, recording numerous successful pop/jazz albums during the 1960s and touring steadily with a large outfit. Zentner was a tireless promoter and claimed to have played 178 consecutive one-night performances when the band was at its peak. His ensemble was voted "Best Big Band" for 13 straight years by Down Beat, and Zentner himself was voted Best Trombonist in Playboy Jazz Readers' Poll. In 1962, his album Up a Lazy River (Big Band Plays the Big Hits, Vol. 2) (arranged by Bob Florence) won a Grammy Award for Best Pop Instrumental Performance. The song "Up A Lazy River" reached number 19 on Canada's CHUM Charts, December 18, 1961.

Zentner's success was thoroughly unusual; he had a thriving big band going at a time when big band music was, for the most part, on the wane. He suffered from leukemia late in life, though he continued performing into 1999; he died of the disease in early 2000 in Las Vegas, Nevada.

== Discography ==
- Sleepy Lagoon (Liberty, 1957)
- Introducing Si Zentner and His Dance Band (Bel Canto, 1958)
- High Noon Cha Cha Cha (Bel Canto, 1959)
- A Thinking Man's Band (Liberty, 1959)
- Swing Fever (Bel Canto, 1959)
- Suddenly It's Swing (Liberty, 1960)
- The Swingin' Eye (Liberty, 1960)
- Great Band with Great Voices (Liberty, 1961)
- Big Band Plays the Big Hits (Liberty, 1961) U.S. No. 65
- Great Band with Great Voices...Swing the Great Voices of the Great Bands (Liberty, 1961)
- Presenting Si Zentner (Smash, 1961)
- Exotica Suite with Martin Denny (Liberty, 1962)
- In Person (International Award Series, 1962)
- The Stripper and Other Big Band Hits (Liberty, 1962) U.S. No. 108
- Si and His Orchestra Play Desafinado (Liberty, 1962) U.S. No. 139
- Up a Lazy River (Big Band Plays the Hits, Vol. 2) (Liberty, 1962) U.S. No. 107\
- Waltz in Jazz Time (Liberty, 1963)
- Rhythm Plus Blues (Liberty, 1963)
- More (Liberty, 1963)
- Music That's Going Places (Liberty, 1963)
- From Russia with Love (Liberty, 1964)
- Si Zentner Plays the Big Band Hits (Liberty, 1964)
- Bond's 007 Theme (Liberty, 1964)
- Si Zentner in Full Swing! (Liberty, 1965)
- My Cup of Tea (RCA Victor, 1965)
- It's Nice to Go Trav'ling (RCA Victor, 1965)
- Put Your Head On My Shoulder (RCA Victor, 1966)
- A Perfect Blend (Liberty, 1966)
- Swingin' Country (Liberty, 1966)
- Warning Shot (Liberty, 1967)
- Right Here! Right Now! The Big Mod Sound Of (Liberty, 1967)
- The Wonderful Sound (Liberty, 1969)
- Great Band Sounds of Si Zentner (United Artists, 1975)
