= Stereo 35/MM =

Studio album by Enoch Light and His Orchestra
- Released: 1961
- Studio: Carnegie Hall
- Label: Command

Stereo 35/MM, later reissued under the title Enoch Light And His Orchestra At Carnegie Hall, is an album by Enoch Light and His Orchestra. It was released in 1961 on Command Records (catalog no. RS 826-S.D.). The musicians performing solos included Doc Severinsen, Phil Bodner, and Bobby Byrne.

The album was recorded at Carnegie Hall with the original master on 35mm magnetic film. The liner notes boasted: The first time you hear this record will be one of the most startling experiences of your entire life. For the very first time, you will hear sound that is completely liberated, sound that is totally free—pure, full, honest sound with no mechanical restrictions whatsoever."

Stereo 35/MM debuted on the Billboard magazine pop album chart on October 9, 1961, held the No. 1 spot for seven weeks, and remained on the chart for 57 weeks.

AllMusic gave the album a rating of two stars. Reviewer Ted Mills found the sound to be crisp and the stereo separation fine.

== Track listing ==
Side A

1. "Heat Wave" (I. Berlin) [2:21]
2. "The Man I Love" (I. & G. Gershwin) [4:11]
3. "I've Got A Crush On You" (I. & G. Gershwin) [2:50]
4. "All The Way" (Cahn, Van Heusen) [3:41]
5. "My Romance" (Rodgers, Hart) [3:01]
6. "You Do Something To Me" (Cole Porter) [2:49]

Side B

1. "Zing Went The Strings Of My Heart" (James Hanley) [2:28]
2. "Someone To Watch Over Me" (I. & G. Gershwin) [3:12]
3. "Love For Sale" (Cole Porter) [3:18]
4. "I'll See You Again" (Noël Coward) [2:59]
5. "I See Your Face Before Me" (Dietz, Schwartz) [3:36]
6. "With A Song In My Heart" (Rodgers, Hart) [2:57]
