= Breakfast at Tiffany's (soundtrack) =

Breakfast at Tiffany's: Music from the Motion Picture

Soundtrack album by Henry Mancini
- Released: 1961 (LP); 1988 (CD)
- Recorded: 1960–1961
- Studio: RCA (Hollywood, California)
- Genre: Soundtrack
- Label: RCA Victor Records
- Producer: Dick Peirce

Singles from Breakfast at Tiffany's: Music from the Motion Picture
- 1. "Moon River" Released: 1961

Breakfast at Tiffany's: Music from the Motion Picture is the soundtrack from the 1961 movie Breakfast at Tiffany's starring Audrey Hepburn. The tracks were re-arranged parts of the film music composed and conducted by Henry Mancini and performed by the Hollywood Studio Symphony. At the 1962 Academy Awards, Mancini and lyricist Johnny Mercer won Oscars for Best Original Song for "Moon River", while Mancini picked up a second statue for Best Original Score. The album also stayed on Billboard's album charts for over ninety weeks.

== Background ==
Because of his success with title themes, such as the theme to the television show Peter Gunn, Henry Mancini was asked by director Blake Edwards to compose the soundtrack to Breakfast at Tiffany's, a symphony jazz soundtrack. A protégé of jazz musician Glenn Miller, he created the Academy Award-winning score for The Glenn Miller Story. After a preview screening of the film an executive from Paramount Pictures was convinced that the song "Moon River" was dead weight and it was due to be cut. Upon learning this, Hepburn responded, "Over my dead body." This response was likely due to the friendly relationship that she had with Mancini. Subsequent to the insistence that the song stay in the film it was not cut and went on to be a hit.

== Collaborations ==
Blake Edwards and Henry Mancini met through Mancini's wife whom Edwards had known for a number of years. After connecting, they decided to collaborate on the television show Peter Gunn, for which Mancini created the title theme. When Edwards learned he would be directing Breakfast at Tiffany’s he chose Mancini as his partner. Their partnership produced successful themes, and they collaborated on numerous other films together. Johnny Mercer provided the lyrics for the song. The artists had a smooth relationship, which resulted in the creation of the song. After Mancini played the melody for Mercer, he offered three different variations of lyrics and the two decided on a final combination. Mancini believed that Hepburn's recording was the best. He is quoted saying, “Moon River was written for her. No one else has ever understood it so completely. There have been more than a thousand versions of "Moon River", but hers is unquestionably the greatest.”* Mancini had respect for Audrey Hepburn, and the feeling was mutual; after watching the film Audrey wrote a letter to Mancini saying, “Your music has lifted us all up and sent us soaring. Everything we cannot say with words or show with action you have expressed for us. You have done this with so much imagination, fun and beauty. You are the hippest of cats - and the most sensitive of composers!”

== Track listing ==
All music composed by Henry Mancini.

Side 1:

1. "Moon River" (Henry Mancini, Johnny Mercer)
2. "Something for Cat"
3. "Sally's Tomato"
4. "Mr. Yunioshi"
5. "The Big Blow Out"
6. "Hub Caps and Tail Lights"

Side 2:

1. "Breakfast at Tiffany's"
2. "Latin Golightly"
3. "Holly"
4. "Loose Caboose"
5. "The Big Heist"
6. "Moon River Cha Cha" (Mancini, Mercer)

As with many soundtrack albums by Mancini and others at the time, the album released alongside the film was a re-recording. In 2013 Intrada released the complete score in its original film performance, along with the first inclusion of Hepburn's recording on a soundtrack album:

1. Main Title (Moon River) (3:07)
2. Paul Meets Cat (1:24)
3. Sally's Tomato (4:57)
4. The Big Blowout (1:05)
5. Poor Fred (3:22)
6. Moon River (Cha Cha) (2:32)
7. Latin Golightly (3:05)
8. Something For Cat (4:48)
9. Loose Caboose – Part 1 (À La Cha Cha) (3:22)
10. Loose Caboose – Part 2 (2:11)
11. Moon River (Vocal By Audrey Hepburn) (2:03)
12. Meet The Doc (With Organ Grinder) (1:37)
13. An Exceptional Person (2:57)
14. You're So Skinny (0:57)
15. Turkey Eggs (2:43)
16. Hub Caps And Tail Lights (2:19)
17. Rats And Super Rats (2:27)
18. The Hard Way (0:55)
19. Rusty Trawler (0:26)
20. Holly (1:56)
21. A Lovely Place (1:33)
22. Bermuda Nights (0:22)
23. The Big Heist (4:02)
24. After The Ball (1:14)
25. Just Like Holly (1:41)
26. Wait A Minute (0:44)
27. Feathers (1:14)
28. Let's Eat (1:39)
29. Where's The Cat? And End Title (Moon River) (3:50)
30. Moon River (Audrey Hepburn & Guitar) (1:38)
31. Moon River (Piano And Guitar) (1:38)
32. Moon River (Harmonica And Guitar) (1:36)
33. Meet The Doc (Without Organ Grinder) (1:37)
34. Piano Practice No. 1 (1:38)
35. Piano Practice No. 2 (1:48)
36. Piano Practice No. 3 (0:54)
37. Moon River (New York Version) (2:01)
38. Moon River (Whistling) (0:10)

== Personnel ==
- Accordion – Carl Fortina
- Bass – Red Mitchell
- Chorus – RCA Victor Chorus
- Drums – Larry Bunker, Milt Holland, Ralph Collier, Shelly Manne
- Guitar – Al Hendrickson, Bob Bain, Laurindo Almeida
- Harmonica – Toots Thielemans
- Organ – Victor Piemonte
- Piano – Jimmy Rowles
- Percussion - Lou Singer
- Reeds – Gene Cipriano, Ronald Langinger, Wilbur Schwartz
- Trombone – Dick Nash, George Roberts, Jimmy Priddy, John Halliburton, Karl De Karske
- Trumpet – Frank Beach, Joe Triscari, Pete Candoli, Ray Triscari
- Vibraphone – Larry Bunker
- Orchestra – Hollywood Studio Symphony
- Vocals, Guitar – Audrey Hepburn

== Chart positions ==
Year	Chart	Position
1962	Billboard Pop Albums (Billboard 200) (stereo)	1

== Certifications ==
Region	Certification	Certified units/sales
United States (RIAA)	Gold	500,000^{^}
^{^} Shipments figures based on certification alone.
