= Live at the BBC (Hugh Masekela album) =

Live album by Hugh Masekela
- Released: 23 April 2002
- Recorded: 23 June 1985; 16 November 1988
- Venue: Glastonbury Festival, Nelson Mandela Concert
- Genre: Jazz
- Length: 1:16:00
- Label: Varèse Sarabande 061197
- Producer: Chris Lycett, Jeff Griffin

Hugh Masekela chronology
Time (2002)	Live at the BBC (2002)	The Collection (2003)

Professional ratings
Review scores
Source	Rating
AllMusic	3/5 stars
The Encyclopedia of Popular Music	2/5 stars
The Penguin Guide to Jazz	2.5/4 stars

Live at the BBC is a live album by South African trumpeter Hugh Masekela. It contains the tracks recorded on 23 June 1985 at the Glastonbury Festival in England and on 16 November 1988 at the Nelson Mandela Concert. The album was released on 23 April 2002 via Varèse Sarabande label.

== Reception ==
Matt Collar of AllMusic noted: "Featuring many songs off his 1985 release, Waiting for the Rain, the songs liberally combine disco, soul, and jazz with Afro-pop, all with a strong anti-apartheid stance. Songs such as 'Politician' and 'Serhasa' deal directly with governmental corruption in Africa, while others, such as the jubilant 'Zulu Wedding,' merely hint at the ennui of apartheid while focusing on the happiness of marriage. With Masekela's catchy melodies, this stuff has a lot in common with other African-influenced pop of the '80s by Western artists such as David Byrne and Paul Simon, yet retains a purist appeal."

== Track listing ==
No.	Title	Writer(s)	Length
1.	"Zulu Wedding"	Masekela	5:40
2.	"Serhasa"	Masekela	5:55
3.	"Politician"	Masekela	7:04
4.	"Tonight"	Masekela	5:58
5.	"Lady"	Fela Kuti	6:18
6.	"Don't Go Lose It Baby"	Masekela	8:15
7.	"Montlalepula"	Masekela	8:37
8.	"Bye Bye Bethelezi"	Masekela	3:40
9.	"Stimela"	Masekela	7:21
10.	"Bring Him Back Home (Nelson Mandela)"	Hugh Masekela, Michael Timothy	3:34
11.	"Jikele Maweni"	Masekela	4:00
12.	"Soweto Blues"	Hugh Masekela, Papa Frankie Todd	5:33
13.	"Amampondo"	Masekela	4:05
Total length:			1:16:00
