= Melody Maker (Hugh Masekela album) =

1976 studio album by Hugh Masekela

Studio album by Hugh Masekela
- Released: 1976
- Recorded: c. 1976 in
- Studio: D & B Studios (Silver Spring, Maryland); American Star Studios (Fairfax, Virginia)
- Genre: Jazz
- Label: Casablanca NBLP-7036
- Producer: Hugh Masekela, Stewart Levine

Hugh Masekela chronology
Colonial Man (1975)	Melody Maker (1976)	You Told Your Mama Not to Worry (1977)

Melody Maker is the nineteenth studio album by South African musician Hugh Masekela. It was recorded in Silver Spring, Maryland, and Fairfax, Virginia, and released in 1976 via Casablanca Records label. Songs "Toejam" and "Hi-Life" were re-released on CD in 1998 on Verve Records as part of The Boy's Doin' It album.

== Reception ==
A reviewer of Dusty Groove stated: "Hats off to Hugh Masekela – one of the few artists who could record for the Casablanca label and never manage to lose his own sense of sound and spirit! The album's a surprisingly great one, filled with the kinds of subtle touches and earthy soul we've always loved in Hugh's music – certainly a bit more polished than before, given the date of the record, but still filled with some really personal, individual moments. The set begins with a beautiful long instrumental titled 'Hi Life' – with Hugh blowing a long, lean solo over the top of a mellow groove – then it moves into a range of shorter numbers, both vocal and instrumental, including the funk track 'Toe Jam', plus the cuts 'Come On Home', 'Melodi', 'I'll Make You Feel Alright', 'Melody Maker', and 'Dance'."

== Track listing ==
No.	Title	Writer(s)	Length
1.	"Hi-Life"	Adaloja Gboyega, Hugh Masekela, Yaw Opoku	9:34
2.	"The Best of My Love"	Don Henley, Glenn Frey, JD Souther	3:12
3.	"Melody Maker"	Hugh Masekela	3:36
4.	"Dance"	Stanley Todd, Hugh Masekela	3:00
5.	"Toejam"	Hugh Masekela, Yaw Opoku, Jagger Niisai Botchway	4:30
6.	"I'll Make You Feel Alright"	Stanley Todd	3:04
7.	"Come on Home"	Hugh Masekela	4:15
8.	"Melodi"	Hugh Masekela	3:10

== Personnel ==
- Isaak Asante – percussion
- Richard Neesai Botchway – guitar
- Eka-Ete – vocals
- Adaloja Gboyega – composer, keyboards
- Stewart Levine – engineer, producer
- Hugh Masekela – composer, horn, producer
- Yaw Opoku – bass, composer
- Papa Frankie Todd – drums
- Stanley Todd – guitar, organ, vocals
