= Introducing Hedzoleh Soundz =

1973 studio album by Hugh Masekela

Studio album by Hugh Masekela
- Released: 1973
- Recorded: July 1973
- Studio: EMI Studios, Lagos, Nigeria
- Genre: Jazz
- Label: Blue Thumb BTS 62
- Producer: Stewart Levine

Hugh Masekela chronology
| Home Is Where the Music Is (1972) | Introducing Hedzoleh Soundz (1973) | I Am Not Afraid (1974) |

Professional ratings
Review scores
| Source | Rating |
|---|---|
| AllMusic | 3/5 stars |
| Sputnikmusic | 4/5 stars |

Introducing Hedzoleh Soundz is the fifteenth studio album by South African trumpeter Hugh Masekela. It was recorded in Lagos, Nigeria, and released in 1973. The track "Languta" was later included in Masekela's 2004 album Still Grazing.

== Background ==
Hedzoleh Soundz were a band from Accra, Ghana, formed in the late 1960s. The word Hedzoleh means "freedom" in the Ga language. The album contains eight tracks: six are written by Hedzoleh, one by Masekela, and one is traditional. Their original melodies were based on traditional Akan and Ewe music and employed dark, organic-sounding African drums instead of modern western congas. Hugh Masekela was introduced to Hedzoleh by Fela Kuti. In addition to this album, Masekela recorded two more with Hedzoleh: I am Not Afraid and The Boy's Doin' It.

== Track listing ==
| No. | Title | Writer(s) | Length |
|---|---|---|---|
| 1. | "Languta" | Hugh Masekela | 4:49 |
| 2. | "Kaa Ye Oya" | Nii Morton, Sam Nortey | 4:36 |
| 3. | "Adade" | Nii Morton, Obo Addy, Sam Nortey | 4:16 |
| 4. | "Yei Baa Gbe Wolo" | Nii Morton, Sam Nortey | 5:40 |
| 5. | "Patience" | Nat Hammond, Richard Neesai | 3:50 |
| 6. | "When" | Nat Hammond | 7:31 |
| 7. | "Nye Tamo Ame" | Nat Hammond | 5:25 |
| 8. | "Rekpete" | adapted by Hedzoleh Soundz | 3:48 |

== Personnel ==
- Congas, vocals – James Kwaku Morton
- Congas, vocals, flute – Nat "Leepuma" Hammond
- Design, cover – Milton Glaser
- Drums – Acheampong Welbeck
- Electric bass, vocals – Stanley Kwesi Todd
- Engineer – Rik Pekkonen
- Guitar – Richard Neesai "Jagger" Botchway
- Mastered by – Arnie Acosta
- Percussion, vocals – Samuel Nortey
- Producer – Stewart Levine
- Talking drum, vocals, percussion – Isaac Asante
- Bass guitar- Isaac Paajoe Amissah-Aidoo
