= Nomsa =

Nomsa is a feminine given name. Notable people with the name include:

- Helene Nomsa Brath (born 1942), American model and activist
- Nomsa Buthelezi (born 1982), South African actress and television presenter
- Nomsa Kubheka (born 1970), South African politician
- Nomsa Marchesi (born 1970), South African politician
- Nomsa Manaka (born 1965), South African dancer, choreographer and actress
- Nomsa Mdlalose, South African folklorist, storyteller, writer, and cultural scholar
- Nomsa Mokwai (born 1992), South African international rugby union player
- Nomsa Moyo, Zimbabwean former footballer
- Nomsa Mtsweni, South African politician
