= You Told Your Mama Not to Worry =

Studio album by Hugh Masekela
- Released: 9 November 1977
- Studio: Ambassador Records (Kumasi, Ghana)
- Genre: Jazz
- Label: Casablanca NBLP-7079
- Producer: Hugh Masekela, Stanley Todd

Hugh Masekela chronology
Melody Maker (1976)	You Told Your Mama Not to Worry (1977)	Herb Alpert / Hugh Masekela (1978)

You Told Your Mama Not to Worry is the twentieth studio album by South African musician Hugh Masekela. It was recorded in Kumasi, Ghana, and released on 9 November 1977 via Casablanca Records label.

== Background ==
The album includes the song "Soweto Blues" performed by Miriam Makeba. The song is about the Soweto uprising against apartheid that occurred in 1976. The songs "You Told Your Mama Not to Worry" and "Mami Wata" were re-released on CD in 1998 on Verve Records as additional part of his previous album The Boy's Doin' It.

== Reception ==
Professional ratings
Review scores
Source	Rating
The Encyclopedia of Popular Music	3/5 stars

A reviewer for Dusty Groove wrote: "Pure 70s genius from Hugh Masekela – a record that's quite different than his earlier Afro-soul styled albums, but somehow even better! The format here is much more straightly soulful – with larger arrangements and a strong vocal groove on a number of tracks – but Masekela's trumpet is still blasting firmly over the top of the tunes, infusing them with a soaring sense of soul that's really great! Rhythms change up nicely from the early days – getting complicated at times, and matching the seriousness of the message on the best tracks – and titles include 'Black Beauty', 'Makonko', 'You Told Your Mama Not To Worry', 'Hangover', 'Soweto Blues', and 'The Mandingo Man'."

A reviewer for Napster wrote: "Hugh Masekela's 1975 crossover album incorporated American pop and proto-Disco[sic] into his sound. You can also hear Funk influencing the angular, stuttering grooves and the heavily effected horns on the tracks. An excellent document of the ongoing cultural exchange between African and American popular music at the time, it's fun, danceable music as well."

== Track listing ==
You Told Your Mama Not to Worry track listing
No.	Title	Writer(s)	Length
1.	"You Told Your Mama Not to Worry"	Hugh Masekela, Letta Mbulu	7:18
2.	"Hangover" (Babalazi, aka "I Haven't Slept")	Hugh Masekela, Letta Mbulu, Stanley Todd	5:20
3.	"Soweto Blues"	Hugh Masekela, Stanley Todd	5:48
4.	"Black Beauty"	Stanley Todd	6:17
5.	"Mami Wata" (aka Mamiwater)	Hugh Masekela, Stanley Todd	3:36
6.	"Makonko"	adapted by Hugh Masekela	4:37
7.	"The Mandingo Man"	Hugh Masekela	5:42

== Personnel ==
- Backing vocals – Julia Waters, Luther Waters, Maxine Waters, Oren Waters
- Bass guitar – Ernie Baiddoo
- Co-producer – Rik Pekonnen
- Coordinator – Nga Machema
- Drums – Frank Todd
- Executive producer – Stewart Levine
- Flugelhorn (uncredited) – Hugh Masekela
- Guitar – Stanley Todd
- Illustration – Henry Vizcarra
- Percussion – Paulinho Da Costa
- Photography – Ron Slenzak
- Piano – Hugh Masekela
- Producer – Hugh Masekela, Stanley Todd
- Remix – Rik Pekonnen
- Vocals – Christine Clinton, Elvin Brown, Hugh Masekela, Miriam Makeba, Richard Sirleaf, Stanley Todd

== Production ==
- Recorded at Ambassador Records / Kumasi, Ghana
- Remixed at Hollywood Sound Studios
- Mastered at Allen Zentz Mastering, Hollywood
- Conceived at Ringway Hotel, Accra, Ghana
