= Grrr (Hugh Masekela album) =

Studio album by Hugh Masekela
- Released: 1966
- Recorded: April – May 1965
- Studio: New York City
- Genre: Jazz
- Length: 32:41
- Label: Mercury SR 61109
- Producer: Ed Townsend

Hugh Masekela chronology
Trumpet Africaine (1962)	Grrr (1966)	The Americanization of Ooga Booga (1966)

Professional ratings
Review scores
Source	Rating
AllMusic	4.5/5 stars
The Encyclopedia of Popular Music	3/5 stars
The Penguin Guide to Jazz	3/4 stars
Tom Hull	B+

Grrr is the second studio album by South African musician Hugh Masekela. It was recorded in New York City and released in 1966 via Mercury Records. Grrr was re-released on LP in 1968 on Wing/Mercury labels as Hugh Masekela and on CD in 2003 on Verve label. On this record, he seamlessly fuses jazz ideas with the rhythmically complex South African music known as Mbaqanga.

== Reception ==
A reviewer of Dusty Groove wrote: "Great early work from Hugh Masekela! The record features all instrumental tracks – all short, and with Hugh's funky South African trumpet rolling over the top! The overall sound is a lot less slick than on some of his late 60s hits – and you can really hear his roots in the South African jazz scene on this one. The tracks are spare, with a strong jazz component – and dancing piano lines behind the raspy and soulful trumpet and trombone solos that dominate much of the record."

== Track listing ==
No.	Title	Writer(s)	Length
1.	"U, Dwi" (Song for my Mother)	Hugh Masekela	3:09
2.	"Zulu and the Mexican"	Hugh Masekela	3:17
3.	"Emavungweni" (Green Home)	Ndikho Xaba	3:05
4.	"Ntjilo-Ntjilo" (The Love Bird)	Miriam Makeba	4:05
5.	"Sharpville"	Hugh Masekela	3:26
6.	"Umaningi Bona" (Long River)	Zack Nkabinde	3:11
7.	"Sipho"	Gwigwi Mrwebi	3:37
8.	"Kwa-Blaney"	Jonas Gwangwa	2:07
9.	"Mra"	Christopher Mra Ngcukana	3:04
10.	"Phatsha-Phatsha" (Hurry-Hurry aka Puffin' on Down the Track)	Lemmy "Special" Mabaso	2:54
Total length:			32:41

== Personnel ==
- Arranging – Hugh Masekela (tracks: 1 2 3 4 5 6 7 9 10), Jonas Gwangwa (tracks: 8)
- Producer – Ed Townsend
- Editor – Luchi DeJesus
- Photography – Bob Eimore & Associates, Inc.
- Photography – Bob Prokup

=== Uncredited personnel ===
- Guitar – Eric Gale
- Piano – Larry Willis
- Saxophone – Morris Goldberg
- Trombone – Jonas Gwangwa
- Tuba – Howard St. John

The uncredited personnel is identified by Hugh Masekela in his autobiography Still Grazing: The Musical Journey of Hugh Masekela (Crown 2004, ISBN 978-0-609-60957-6).
