= Stimela =

Stimela may refer to:

- Stimela (band), a South African jazz ensemble
- Stimela (album), a 1994 album by Hugh Masekela
- "Stimela (Coal Train)", a 1974 song by Hugh Masekela
- "Stimela", a 2012 song by Diana Gordon (as Wynter Gordon)
