= To Be or Not to Bop =

1979 book by Dizzy Gillespie

To Be, or Not to Bop
- Softcover edition
- Authors: Dizzy Gillespie; Al Fraser
- Language: English
- Genre: Music autobiographies
- Published: July 1979
- Publisher: Doubleday
- Publication place: United States
- Media type: Print (hardback and paperback)
- Pages: 552 pp.
- ISBN: 978-0385120524

To Be or Not to Bop: Memoirs of Dizzy Gillespie is a 1979 book written by jazz musician, composer and band leader Dizzy Gillespie. The book was released in July 1979 by Doubleday. The University of Minnesota Press re-released the book in 2009.

== Background ==
He is known for being the father of bebop. This book tells about his life, and what he went through to make this music flourish. The book introduces Dizzy and his friends like Charlie "Bird" Parker as they struggled to make money by playing. Later on it tells of how Dizzy became a great trumpeter and even the origin of his signature bent trumpet.

Various compositions and albums have been named after Gillespie's book title.

== See also ==
Biographies of other famous trumpeters

- Still Grazing: The Musical Journey of Hugh Masekela (2004) by Hugh Masekela
