= Erik Paliani =

- Born: 6 September 1975 (age 51); Blantyre, Malawi
- Genres: Jazz, Afrobeat, Afro-fusion, R&B
- Occupations: Musician, composer, record producer
- Instrument: Guitar
- Years active: 1995–present
- Labels: Giant Steps, Sony Music Entertainment, Sony BMG, Peak

Erik Paliani (born 6 September 1975) is a Malawian guitarist, producer, and songwriter. He is best known for his work with singer Zamajobe Sithole, trumpeter Hugh Masekela, and guitarist Lee Ritenour.

== Early life ==
Paliani was born in Blantyre, Malawi. He began his musical training as a child under the guidance of his father, Richard Howard Paliani, a magistrate by profession, but an avid guitar player as well. As a young boy and still attending Primary School at Saint Kizito Primary School (1980-1989) Erik Paliani was already a member of two of his father's band Concepts, the Jess Connection and Paliani Progression. During this period Paliani toyed around the ukulele, Keyboards and Bass guitar. In 1992 he graduated from Phwezi Boys Secondary School in Rumphi, Malawi and went on to complete his tertiary education at Harare Polytechnic in Harare, Zimbabwe. Shortly after returning to Malawi he joined the Afro-fusion group Acacias Band (not to be confused with the similarly named British band Acacia). The band achieved substantial notoriety throughout Malawi and recorded two successful albums. Paliani credits his tenure with the Acacias Band for providing the foundation for his success internationally. Other notable solo artists to come out of this band include Ben Mankhamba (Ben Michael) and Chris Kele.

== Career ==
During the latter half of 1998 and continuing into 1999, Paliani began traveling to Johannesburg, South Africa for musical engagements, and by the year 2000 he had permanently relocated there. While establishing himself in the Johannesburg music scene he joined the bands of Reverend Benjamin Dube, jazz bassist Musa Manzini and pianist Themba Mkhize.

It was during this time that he met singer Zamajobe Sithole a member of Reverend Dube's choir. Paliani played a key role as guitarist and producer on Zamajobe's 2004 debut album Ndawo Yami (Sony BMG Music Entertainment/Giant Steps) for which he was nominated a SAMA award in the category Best Joint Composition. In 2006 Paliani appeared in the film Catch a Fire playing the role of a jazz guitarist. That same year he recorded on three tracks for Lee Ritenour's album Smoke 'n' Mirrors (Peak Records). Beginning in 2008 he produced several album including iSiGiDiMi for Xhosa guitarist Mavo Solomon, Zamajobe's second album Ndoni Yamanzi, and then in 2009 Hugh Masekela's album Phola. In 2010, he released his first solo album entitled Chitukutuku which also earned him critical acclaim including another SAMA nomination.

In 2011, Paliani moved to Polokwane, a city in the Northern Province of South Africa. In Polokwane he collaborated with the Limpopo Arts and Culture Association and taught guitar to young guitarists. He also took time to study more Jazz and polish up Producing skills. Yet, he still remained relevant to the Johannesburg musical scene, performing and producing mildly.

In 2014, Paliani briefly toured with the Jamaican legendary duo Sly and Robbie in Johannesburg.

In 2018, he launched the first International Jazz festival in Malawi, The Lilongwe International Jazz Festival.

Paliani has also established a recording Studio and Music Studying Centre in Mchinji, Malawi.

== Discography ==
As bandleader

- Chitukutuku 2010 (Giant Steps)

As producer and/or songwriter

- w/ Zamajobe : Ndawo Yami 2004 (Giant Steps), Ndoni Yamanzi 2008 (Giant Steps)
- w/ Mavo Solomon : iSiGiDiMi 2008 (Maverik Sounds)
- w/ Hugh Masekela : Phola 2009 (Four-Quarters Ent)

As sideman and/or songwriter

- w/ Lee Ritenour : Smoke 'n' Mirrors 2006 (Peak)

As a Band Member (Highlights) Hugh Masekela (Musical Director/ Guitarist) Themba Mkhize (Guitarist) Musa Manzini (Guitarist) Zamajobe (Musical Director/Guitarist) Sly and Robbie (Guitarist)
