= Playing @ Work =

Studio album by Hugh Masekela
- Released: 19 November 2012
- Venue: Pretoria, South Africa
- Genre: Jazz
- Length: 59:25
- Label: House of Masekela HOM002

Hugh Masekela chronology
Friends (2012)	Playing @ Work (2012)	No Borders (2016)

Alternative cover
- Cover for Playing @ Work re-worked

Playing @ Work is a studio album by South African jazz trumpeter Hugh Masekela. The album was recorded in Pretoria and released in 2012 and then in 2013 as a reworked version.

== Critical reception ==
Brendah Nyakudya of Afropolitan noted: "Any fan of Bra Hugh will be pleased with this album as it shows that the musical master still has a few tricks up his sleeve and continues to make music to please."

== Track listing ==
1. "Africa Hold Hands" - 06:45
2. "It's All Over Now Baby Blue" - 07:39
3. "Go Look out for Mama (Umama Ugugile)" - 07:27
4. "Sugar Daddy (Ikhehla Lo M'Fana)" - 06:36
5. "Perlemoen" - 04:14
6. "Sista Fania" - 09:38
7. "Soul Rebel" - 06:14
8. "Soweto Blues" (feat. Pu2Ma) - 06:52
9. "Rekpete" - 05:24
10. "Mama" - 10:33
