= Hugh Masekela's Next Album =

Studio album by Hugh Masekela
- Released: December 1966
- Studio: New York City
- Genre: Jazz
- Length: 44:02
- Label: MGM
- Producer: Tom Wilson

Hugh Masekela chronology
The Americanization of Ooga Booga (1966)	Hugh Masekela's Next Album (1966)	The Emancipation of Hugh Masekela (1966)

Professional ratings
Review scores
Source	Rating
The Encyclopedia of Popular Music	3/5 stars

Hugh Masekela's Next Album is the fourth studio album by South African jazz trumpeter Hugh Masekela. It was recorded in New York City and released in December 1966 via MGM Records label. The album consists mainly of covers of pop songs.

== Track listing ==
No.	Title	Writer(s)	Length
1.	"California Dreamin'"	John Phillips	3:58
2.	"Little Star"	Hugh Masekela, Stewart Levine	2:57
3.	"It's Not Unusual"	Gordon Mills, Les Reed	3:03
4.	"Loving You Is Sweeter Than Ever"	Ivy Jo Hunter, Stevie Wonder	4:24
5.	"Norwegian Wood"	John Lennon, Paul McCartney	2:55
6.	"If I Needed Someone"	George Harrison	6:30
7.	"Along Comes Mary"	Tandyn Almer	3:21
8.	"She's Comin' My Way"	Caiphus Semenya, Hotep Cecil Barnard, Jeanth Dubois	3:02
9.	"Sounds of Silence"	Paul Simon	3:40
10.	"Actin' Like a Fool"	Hugh Masekela, Stewart Levine	3:20
11.	"From Me to You"	Charlie Smalls, Hugh Masekela	3:50
12.	"Elusive Butterfly"	Bob Lind	3:09
Total length:			44:02

== Personnel ==
- Val Valentin – director of engineering
- Frank Abbey – engineer, recording
- David Greene – engineer, remix
- Hugh Masekela – liner notes
- Tom Wilson – producer
