= Main Event Live =

1978 live album by Herb Alpert and Hugh Masekela

Live album by Herb Alpert and Hugh Masekela
- Released: 1978
- Recorded: 1978
- Venue: The Roxy, A&M Sound Stage
- Genre: Jazz
- Label: A&M SP-4727
- Producer: Herb Alpert, Hugh Masekela, Jonas Gwangwa

Hugh Masekela chronology
Herb Alpert / Hugh Masekela (1978)	Main Event Live (1978)	Home (1981)

Herb Alpert chronology
Herb Alpert / Hugh Masekela (1978)	Main Event Live (1978)	Rise (1979)

Professional ratings
Review scores
Source	Rating
AllMusic	3/5 stars
The Encyclopedia of Popular Music	2/5 stars

Main Event Live is collaborative live album by Herb Alpert and Hugh Masekela. It was recorded in Los Angeles, California, and released in 1978 via A&M Records label.

== Reception ==
Richard Ginell of AllMusic stated: "'Let the good times roll,' Herb Alpert seemed to say as he quickly rejoined forces with Masekela for a follow-up LP to their first collaboration earlier that year. Recording live at the Roxy Theatre and on A&M's soundstage without duplicating anything on their earlier studio album, the two horn players (Alpert on trumpet, Masekela on flugelhorn) are, if anything, looser and more freewheeling than before. Though Alpert is not on quite as sure a jazz footing as Masekela, neither musician tries to blow the other out of the room. The band, containing only one holdover (guitarist Arthur Adams) from the first album, is more attuned to Latin funk/jazz with a South African tinge this time. Again, Alpert and Masekela have mostly fine tunes to work with, none better than 'Foreign Natives' and 'Shame the Devil' by African trombonist Mosa Jonas Gwangwa, plus Henry Sithole's wistfully haunting 'Mama Way' (which has chanted vocals and a string quartet). This album and its predecessor had the effect of recharging Alpert's music, though both are almost forgotten today".

A reviewer of Dusty Groove wrote: "Masterful live set by Herb Alpert and Hugh Masekela – recorded at The Roxy in LA in 1978! Both their studio record from the same year and this massive live recording work incredibly well – as they're both geniuses and blending distinctive global influences – but they really cook in this live session in a way that's smoothed over a bit in the studio!"

== Track listing ==
No.	Title	Writer(s)	Length
1.	"Foreign Natives"	Jonas Gwangwa	9:15
2.	"People Make the World Go 'Round"	Thom Bell, Linda Creed	5:36
3.	"Besame Mucho"	Sunny Skylar, Consuelo Velázquez	4:14
4.	"I'm Comin' Home"	Herb Alpert	5:22
5.	"Shebeen"	Jonas Gwangwa	3:30
6.	"Kalahari Nights"	Jonas Gwangwa	6:24
7.	"Shame the Devil"	Jonas Gwangwa	6:58
8.	"Mama Way"	Henry Sithole	5:50

== Personnel ==
- David Williams - double bass, bass
- Buddy Williams - drums
- Hugh Masekela - flugelhorn
- Arthur Adams, Jeff Sigman - guitar
- Manolo Badrena - percussion
- Larry Willis - piano, synthesizer, electric piano
- Jonas Mosa Gwangwa - trombone
- Herb Alpert - trumpet
