= Uptownship =

Studio album by Hugh Masekela
- Released: 1989
- Recorded: November 1988 – July 1989
- Studio: Evergreen Studios (New York City), Quantum Studios (Jersey City, NJ), Baby Monster Studios (NYC), RCA Studios (NYC)
- Genre: Jazz
- Length: 1:01:26
- Label: Novus Records 3070
- Producer: Hugh Masekela, John Cartwright, Morris Goldberg, Rick Rowe

Hugh Masekela chronology
Tomorrow (1987)	Uptownship (1989)	Beatin' Aroun de Bush (1992)

Uptownship is a 1989 studio album by South African trumpeter Hugh Masekela. It was recorded in New York City and Jersey City, and released via Novus Records label. It was his last album in exile before the end of apartheid.

== Reception ==
Professional ratings
Review scores
Source	Rating
AllMusic	2/5 stars
The Encyclopedia of Popular Music	3/5 stars
The Rolling Stone Jazz & Blues Album Guide	4/5 stars

Richard S. Ginell of AllMusic noted: "The title of this New York City-recorded album suggests a combination of township jive and uptown Gotham soul and energy, but what we get is some of the former and little of the latter. Here, Masekela alternates South African-inflected pop/jazz with lugubrious covers of a couple of U.S. soul tunes ... and a Bob Marley anthem, 'No Woman, No Cry.'"

== Track listing ==
No.	Title	Writer(s)	Length
1.	"Uptownship"	Hugh Masekela	6:01
2.	"If You Don't Know Me by Now"	Kenny Gamble, Leon Huff	6:25
3.	"Now or Never"	Hugh Masekela	4:46
4.	"Hold On"	Joe Cang, Matthew Cang	5:33
5.	"Ooo Baby Baby"	Smokey Robinson	6:18
6.	"Egoli"	Victor Ndlazilwane	5:38
7.	"No Woman, No Cry"	Vincent Ford, Bob Marley	5:24
8.	"Emavungweni"	Ndikho Xaba	4:31
9.	"Naledi"	John Selolwane	4:10
10.	"Elijah"	Hugh Masekela	5:28
11.	"Nomalizo"	John Dlamini	7:12
Total length:			01:01:26
