= Home (Hugh Masekela album) =

1982 studio album by Hugh Masekela

Studio album by Hugh Masekela
- Released: 1982
- Recorded: 1981
- Studio: Hit Factory, NYC
- Genre: Jazz
- Label: Moonshine Records SHINE 5574
- Producer: Victor Ntoni, Stewart Levine

Hugh Masekela chronology
Main Event Live (1978)	Home (1982)	Techno-Bush (1984)

Professional ratings
Review scores
Source	Rating
The Encyclopedia of Popular Music	3/5 stars

Home is a 1982 studio album by South African jazz trumpeter Hugh Masekela. The album was re-released as a CD in 1996 via Columbia Records, with a slightly rearranged track listing.

== Track listing ==
No.	Title	Writer(s)	Length
1.	"Johannesburg"	Eric Songxaka, Hugh Masekela, Jonas Gwangwa
2.	"Soweto"	Abdullah Ibrahim
3.	"Durban"	Hugh Masekela, Victor Mthimkhulu
4.	"Right Down the Street"	Hugh Masekela
5.	"Sister Fania"	Hotep Cecil Barnard
6.	"Cape Town"	Victor Mhleli Ntoni
7.	"Love Is Never Too Late"	Hugh Masekela, Victor Mhleli Ntoni
8.	"Thandiwe"	Hotep Cecil Barnard, R. McLean

== Personnel ==
Band

- Hugh Masekela – flugelhorn, vocals, producer
- Charles "Poogie" Bell – drums
- Russell Blake – electric bass
- Victor Mhleli Ntoni – electric bass, electric guitar, vocals
- Eric Gale – electric guitar
- Hotep Cecil Barnard – keyboards
- Rene McLean – saxophone, flute
- Aderemi Kabaka – talking drum, drums, percussion
- Thembi Mtshali – vocals

Production

- Joe Ferla – engineer
- Jolie Levine – producer
- Stewart Levine – producer
- Bob Messo – assistant engineer
