= Techno-Bush =

1984 studio album by Hugh Masekela

Studio album by Hugh Masekela
- Released: 1984
- Studio: Battery Mobile at the Woodpecker Inn, Gaborone, Botswana.
- Genre: Jazz
- Label: Jive Afrika JL8-8210
- Producer: Stewart Levine

Hugh Masekela chronology
Home (1982)	Techno-Bush (1984)	Waiting for the Rain (1985)

Professional ratings
Review scores
Source	Rating
AllMusic	3/5 stars
Robert Christgau	B+
The Encyclopedia of Popular Music	3/5 stars
Tom Hull	B

Techno-Bush is a 1984 studio album by South African jazz trumpeter Hugh Masekela. It was recorded in Gaborone, Botswana.

== Reception ==
Robert Christgau stated: "Like Malcolm McLaren with a birthright, Masekela has given up the dull demijazz of his U.S. period and returned to Africa, where he cops riffs and rhythms, calypso raps and organ jive and of course trumpet parts, as cannily as the cleverest imperialist, then serves them up in a highly palatable English-language fusion. Beyond a few leftover dull spots my only cavil is the lyric of the demihit, 'Don't Go Lose It Baby'—shouldn't crow so about being a 'winner' in a country where the deck is stacked like it is in Botswana."

== Track listing ==
No.	Title	Writer(s)	Length
1.	"Don't Go Lose It Baby"	Hugh Masekela, Stewart Levine	6:20
2.	"The Seven Riffs of Africa: Medley" (The Lion Never Sleeps, Isikhokhiyana, Grazing in the Grass)	Hugh Masekela	12:32
3.	"Motlalepula (The Rainmaker)"	Hugh Masekela, Zakes Mchunu	5:45
4.	"Getting Fat in Africa"	Hugh Masekela	4:39
5.	"Pula Ea Na (It's Raining)"	Frank Leepa, Tsepo Tshola	4:28
6.	"African Secret Society"	Hugh Masekela	3:08
7.	"U-Dwi"	Hugh Masekela, Zakes Mchunu	3:26

== Personnel ==
Band

- Hugh Masekela – horns, percussion, vocals, keyboards
- Zakes Mchunu – bass
- Bongani Nxele – drums
- Banjo Mosele – guitar (rhythm)
- John Selolwane – guitars, vocals (listed as John 'Blackie' Selolwane)
- Moses Ngwenya – organ
- Gasper Lawal – percussion
- Mandisa Dlanga – vocals
- Mopati Tsienyane – vocals
- Stella Khumalo – vocals
- Tsepo Tshola – vocals

Production

- Greg Cutler – engineer
- Nigel Green – engineer (mix)
- Stewart Levine – producer
- Peter Harris – programming (on the Fairlight CMI music computer)
