= Tomorrow (Hugh Masekela album) =

Studio album by Hugh Masekela
- Released: 1987
- Recorded: January–September 1986; London
- Genre: Jazz
- Length: 49:27
- Label: WEA 254 573-1
- Producer: Hugh Masekela, Don Freeman, Geoffrey Haslam

Hugh Masekela chronology
Waiting for the Rain (1985)	Tomorrow (1987)	Uptownship (1988)

Professional ratings
Review scores
Source	Rating
Allmusic	4.5/5 stars
Robert Christgau	B–
The Encyclopedia of Popular Music	3/5 stars

Tomorrow is a 1987 studio album by South African trumpeter Hugh Masekela.

== Reception ==
Richard S. Ginell of Allmusic wrote: "Still in exile from his homeland, Hugh Masekela leaves no doubt where he would rather be in this carefully produced, majestically swinging, techno-pop-jazz album that leans heavily in the direction of Soweto. Masekela often performs sophisticated takes on three-chord township jive, leading the massed vocals with his own coarse yet evocatively blunt voice, while leaving himself just enough room to peel off a few patented, repeated-note trumpet licks and double-tracked flugelhorn statements. Later on the record, the keys turn minor but the high-tech verve is still there. The key track is a fine version of Masekela's signature tune of the '80s, 'Bring Him Back Home,' which became prophetic in the next decade with the release of Nelson Mandela from prison (though the 'walking hand in hand with Winnie Mandela' bit didn't last long)." Robert Christgau commented: "The words document his losses, his struggle, his oppression as a South African exile. I learned from them, and that's high praise for any lyric. The music documents the life he wants to lead, which is as corny as any other dance-fusion jazz played by musicians overimpressed with their own chops. He has a right to that life, obviously. Just as obviously, I have a right to pursue my own life elsewhere."

== Track listing ==
No.	Title	Writer(s)	Length
1.	"Bring Him Back Home"	Michael Timothy, Tim Daly, Hugh Masekela	4:41
2.	"Mayibuye"	Don Freeman, Hugh Masekela	6:32
3.	"Ke Bale"	Tsepo Tshola, Hugh Masekela	5:25
4.	"London Fog"	Hugh Masekela, Jabu Moatha-Masekela	7:19
5.	"Everybody's Standing Up"	Michael Timothy, Tim Daly, Hugh Masekela	6:44
6.	"Bird on the Wing"	Bill Lovelady, Hugh Masekela	8:05
7.	"Something for Nothing"	Michael Timothy, Tim Daly, Hugh Masekela	5:49
8.	"Serengeti"	John Selolwane, Mopati Tsienyane, Hugh Masekela	5:16
Total length:			49:27

== Personnel ==
Band

- Hugh Masekela – horn, percussion, producer, trumpet, vocals
- Don Freeman – flute, keyboards, producer, saxophone, synthesizer
- Francis Fuster – congas, percussion
- Patricia Knight – vocals
- Billy Lovelady – guitar
- Mark Millington – tenor saxophone
- Sonti Mndebele – vocals
- Clive Mngaza – drums
- Banjo Mosele – guitar
- Tu Nokwe – vocals
- Aubrey Obert Oaki – bass
- Michael Osapanin – trombone
- John Selolwane – guitar, backing vocals
- Beverley Skeete – vocals
- Richard Stevens – drums
- Michael Timothy – keyboards, synthesizer
- Tsepo Tshola – vocals
- Mopati Tsienyane – drums, vocals

Production

- Stuart Barry – engineer
- Geoffrey Haslam – producer
