= The Americanization of Ooga Booga =

Live album by Hugh Masekela
- Released: June 1966
- Recorded: November 1965
- Venue: The Village Gate, New York City
- Genre: Jazz
- Length: 42:30
- Label: MGM E/SE-4372
- Producer: Tom Wilson

Hugh Masekela chronology
Grrr (1966)	The Americanization of Ooga Booga (1966)	Hugh Masekela's Next Album (1966)

Professional ratings
Review scores
Source	Rating
AllMusic	4/5 stars
The Encyclopedia of Popular Music	3/5 stars
Tom Hull	B+
The Penguin Guide to Jazz Recordings	CD reissue

The Americanization of Ooga Booga is a live album by South African jazz trumpeter Hugh Masekela. MGM released the record in June 1966.

== Background ==
The album is a blend of American jazz themes and traditional South African musical influences. It was recorded live in November 1965 at The Village Gate night club in New York City and released in June 1966 via MGM Records label. MGM's president was convinced that Masekela's albums were too African for American tastes, so soon after Masekela moved to Chisa/Blue Thumb labels.

Verve Records re-released the album in 1996 as a CD named The Lasting Impression of Ooga-Booga, adding five more tracks from his 1968 album The Lasting Impression of Hugh Masekela.

== Reception ==
Bruce Eder of Allmusic noted about this album: "The influence of Dizzy Gillespie and Freddie Hubbard can be heard, along with McCoy Tyner in the playing of pianist Larry Willis, and he shows his debt to John Coltrane as an inspiration on 'Mixolydia' as well as his affinity for Brazilian music on 'Mas que Nada.' But the core sound was what Masekela called 'township bop'—his short trumpet bursts, sometimes seemingly approaching microtonal territory, are engrossing celebrations of the melodies of his repertory, which is mostly of South African origin (including a pair written by his then-wife, Miriam Makeba). Among the latter, the opening number, 'Bajabula Bonke,' aka 'Healing Song,' got its first airing on record here—it would later receive a bolder performance at the Monterey Pop Festival, comprising one of that event's numerous musical highlights, but where that later performance streaked and soared, this one starts out slowly and quietly, exquisitely harmonized and rising gradually and gently like a glider catching rising winds; it's impossible to fully appreciate the Monterey performance without hearing this one. With Herbie Hancock's 'Cantelope Island' providing one firm reference point in the American jazz idiom, the set really wasn't that removed from 1965 listeners, as its stronger-than-expected sales proved."

== Track listing ==
No.	Title	Writer(s)	Length
1.	"Bajabula Bonke" (Healing Song)	Miriam Makeba	7:12
2.	"Dzinorabiro" (The Good Old Days)	Miriam Makeba	5:57
3.	"Unhlanhla" (Lucky Boy)	Angela Makeba	5:01
4.	"Cantelope Island"	Herbie Hancock	5:04
5.	"U-Dwi" (Song to My Mother)	Hugh Masekela	3:09
6.	"Masquenada"	Jorge Ben	6:18
7.	"Abangoma" (Song of Praise)	Miriam Makeba	3:35
8.	"Myxolydia"	Hugh Masekela	6:14

== Personnel ==
- Acy Lehman – artwork
- Hal Dotson – bass
- Hugh Masekela – cornet, flugelhorn, vocals
- Henry Jenkins – drums
- Carl Fischer – photography
- Larry Willis – piano
- Tom Wilson – producer, liner notes
- Reice Hamel – recording
- Val Valentin – recording, director
