= Colonial Man =

1976 studio album by Hugh Masekela

Studio album by Hugh Masekela
- Released: 30 January 1976
- Recorded: c. 1975–76 in New York and Chicago
- Studio: Capricorn Studios (New York), Good Vibrations Studios (New York), The Hit Factory (New York), Regent Sound (New York), Curtom Studios (Chicago)
- Genre: Jazz
- Label: Casablanca NBLP-7023
- Producer: Hugh Masekela

Hugh Masekela chronology
The Boy's Doin' It (1975)	Colonial Man (1976)	Melody Maker (1976)

Professional ratings
Review scores
Source	Rating
The Encyclopedia of Popular Music	3/5 stars

Colonial Man is the eighteenth studio album by South African trumpeter Hugh Masekela. It was recorded in New York and Chicago and released on LP and eight-track cassette on 30 January 1976 via the Casablanca Records label. The album's title song "Colonial Man", "Vasco Da Gama" and "Cecil Rhodes" express African anti-colonial sentiments. At the time of its release, it was referred to variously by reviewers as a concept album and a protest album.

== Reception ==
A reviewer of Dusty Groove wrote: "A later album from Hugh Masekela – but still plenty darn hip, way more so than most of the other artists on the Casablanca label at the time! Hugh's South African groove is still very firmly in place here – mixed with a slightly warmer LA soul sound, but expanded with loads of great arrangements that get a lot more complicated than before – and which bring in some great keyboard and percussion bits. Sivuca makes a wonderful appearance on 1st and 3rd tracks – using that blend of voice and accordion that sounds so great – and the whole record's got a depth and sense of soul that you'd never guess from it's [sic] silly title and cover!"

== Track listing ==
No.	Title	Writer(s)	Length
1.	"A Song for Brasil"	Hugh Masekela	4:13
2.	"Vasco Da Gama" (The Sailor Man)	Hugh Masekela	5:28
3.	"For the Love of You"	O'Kelly Isley, Jr., Rudolph Isley, Ronald Isley	8:25
4.	"Colonial Man"	Hugh Masekela	5:04
5.	"Witch Doctor"	Hugh Masekela	7:31
6.	"Cecil Rhodes"	Hugh Masekela	5:13

== Personnel ==
- Art direction, design – Gribbitt!, Stephen Lumel
- Backing Vocals – Deborah McDuffie (tracks: 1 3 6), Maeretha Stewart (tracks: 1 3 6), Patti Austin (tracks: 1 3 6)
- Bass, vocals – Yaw Opoku
- Director – Stewart Levine
- Drums (traps) – Papa Frankie Todd
- Electric piano – Adaloja Gboyega
- Accordion and voice - Sivuca (track 1)
- Engineer – Rik Pekkonen
- Guitar – "Jagger" Botchway
- Guitar, vocals – Stanley Todd Kwesi
- Mastering – Bernie Grundman
- Photography – David Alexander
- Saxophone, percussion, vocals – O. J. Ekemode
- Shekere, percussion, vocals – Odinga "Guy" Warren
- Talking drum, percussion, vocals – Asante
- Trumpet, vocals – Hugh Masekela

== Re-releases ==
As of 2018, the album has not been released in its entirety on CD or as digital downloads. Compositions "Colonial Man" and "A Song for Brazil" were re-released on CD in 1998 on Verve Records as part of The Boy's Doin' It. "A Song for Brazil", "Colonial Man" and "Witch Doctor" feature on the 2018 posthumous compilation of original recordings: Masekela '66–'76.
