= Phola (album) =

Studio album by Hugh Masekela
- Released: 19 February 2008
- Studio: Zatiya Studios, Playsound Studios, Pyramid Rox Studios (Johannesburg)
- Genre: Jazz
- Length: 55:13
- Label: Four Quarters Entertainment 97012
- Producer: Erik Paliani

Hugh Masekela chronology
Live at the Market Theatre (2007)	Phola (2008)	Jabulani (2012)

Phola is a studio album by South African jazz trumpeter Hugh Masekela. The record was released on 19 February 2008 via Four Quarters Entertainment label.

Phola is a South African notion meaning to get well, to heal, to relax and chill.

== Critical reception ==
Professional ratings
Review scores
Source	Rating
AllMusic	4/5 stars
All About Jazz	2.5/5 stars
The Guardian	3/5 stars
Tom Hull	B+

Michael G. Nastos of AllMusic stated: "Hugh Masakela's recordings in his golden years have been much more rooted in his South African heritage than the commercialized music he played in his younger days. Thankfully, that trend continues with this very fine effort that has him playing his own original material, his storied silver flugelhorn with all the effusive joy his homeland can now proclaim, and singing on every selection, telling tales of renewal, resurrection, and revived positivity... In the decade of the 2000s, Hugh Masakela has come into his own more than at any other time in his long career, and Phola is a shining example that he's still in his prime, making excellent music with no turning back."

Robin Denselow of The Guardian wrote: "Phola is a new set in which his flugelhorn and vocals are matched against mostly light and easygoing backing from the keyboards, guitar and bass work of his Malawian producer and arranger, Erik Paliani. It's a varied album that switches between breezy instrumentals, township vocals and gently sturdy ballads such as the autobiographical Ghana." Kerry Doole of Exclaim! added, "Flugelhorn is his chosen instrument here, and there's a sweet purity in its tone. His vocals aren't quite as eloquent as his horn but are easy enough on the ears, as on the soulful (and possibly autobiographical) ballad "Sonnyboy." ... It would have been nice to hear a few more musical chances being taken here but he has earned the right to rest on his laurels somewhat. A pleasant enough outing."

== Track listing ==
No.	Title	Writer(s)	Length
1.	"Mwanayu Wakula"	Erik Paliani	4:52
2.	"Ghana"	Masekela	5:25
3.	"Bring It Back Home"	Masekela	5:31
4.	"Malungelo"	Masekela	5:56
5.	"Moz"	Masekela	5:35
6.	"Sonnyboy"	Masekela	7:15
7.	"Weather"	Masekela	5:34
8.	"The Joke of Life (Brincar de Viver)"	Guilherme Arantes, Jon Lucien	6:05
9.	"Hunger"	Masekela	9:00
Total length:			55:13

== Personnel ==
Band

- Hugh Masekela – executive producer, flugelhorn, vocals
- Jimmy Dludlu – guitar (acoustic), tracking
- Denny Lalouette – bass
- Stewart Levine – clarinet
- Arthur Tshabalala – Fender Rhodes, piano (electric)
- Fana Zulu – bass

Production

- Yusuf Gandhi – release coordinator
- Burton Yount – package design
- Garrick Van Der Tuin – audio engineer, mixing
- Erik Paliani – arranger, audio production
