= Masekela =

1969 studio album by Hugh Masekela

Studio album by Hugh Masekela
- Released: 1969
- Recorded: possibly September 12–30, 1968 in Los Angeles, California.
- Genre: Jazz
- Label: Uni Records 73041
- Producer: Stewart Levine

Hugh Masekela chronology
The Lasting Impression of Hugh Masekela (1968)	Masekela (1969)	Reconstruction (1970)

Professional ratings
Review scores
Source	Rating
AllMusic	4.5/5 stars
The Encyclopedia of Popular Music	3/5 stars
Sputnikmusic	4/5 stars

Masekela is the eleventh studio album by South African jazz trumpeter Hugh Masekela released via Uni Records label in 1969.

== Background ==
The album was recorded in Los Angeles, California, possibly between 12 and 30 September 1968. Masekela performs mostly his own compositions. The tracks "Mace and Grenades" and "Gold" were later included on his 2004 album Still Grazing.

The track "Mace and Grenades" was issued as a single with "Riot" as the B-side.

== Track listing ==
All tracks composed by Masekela unless indicated otherwise.

No.	Title	Writer(s)	Length
1.	"Mace and Grenades"		3:50
2.	"Boeremusiek"		2:00
3.	"Gold"		4:15
4.	"Sobukwe"		1:54
5.	"Blues for Huey"	Kippie Moeketsi	2:00
6.	"Gafsa"	Dollar Brand	2:35
7.	"Fuzz"		2:50
8.	"Head Peepin'"		2:52
9.	"Otis"		2:05
10.	"Riot"		1:55
11.	"If There's Anybody Out There"		3:30
12.	"Extra Added Attraction"	Philemon Hou	1:00

== Personnel ==
The personnel probably included:

- Hugh Masekela – trumpet, vocals
- Wayne Henderson – trombone
- Al Abreu – saxophone
- Wilton Felder – saxophone
- Bill Henderson – piano
- Arthur Adams – guitar
- Henry Franklin – bass
- Chuck Carter – drums
- Barry Feinstein – photography, cover
