= No Borders =

Studio album by Hugh Masekela
- Released: 11 November 2016
- Recorded: 2016
- Studio: K Cool in Ormonde, Gauteng
- Genre: Jazz
- Length: 1:19:25
- Label: Universal Music

Hugh Masekela chronology
Playing @ Work (2012)	No Borders (2016)	Rejoice (2020)

Professional ratings
Review scores
Source	Rating
The Guardian	4/5 stars

No Borders is the forty-fourth and final studio album by South African jazz trumpeter Hugh Masekela. The album was released on 11 November 2016 via Universal Music label.

== Background ==
The album takes on a journey through the diverse culture, history, and politics of the African continent. The image on the album sleeve is that of a map of Africa from 1590, long before the modern boundaries were drawn up. The message of this is deliberate and clear: the boundaries between African people are artificial and have been drawn up by the colonial powers. The album is Masekela's first in almost five years, and it features an impressive list of guests, including Zimbabwean artist Oliver Mtukudzi in the song "Tapera" that talks about the devastating effects of HIV AIDS in Zimbabwe, and South African Kabomo Vilakazi and Congolese Tresor Riziki in "Congo Women" that is of rumba style, known in the Congolese music as sebene. For No Borders Masekela recorded a new version of his song "Been Such a Long Time Gone"; its lyrics express the feeling of coming back to Africa from his exile in US. "Makeba" is a tribute song to Miriam Makeba, who was his wife for two years. "In an Age" is the only song that Masekela recorded with his son, the American TV presenter Sal Masekela a.k.a. Alekesam (Masekela spelled backwards).

== Reception ==
Robin Denselow of The Guardian wrote: "South Africa’s most celebrated musician is 77 but still breaking down musical barriers with a set 'covering most of the international African world'. This is Hugh Masekela’s first album in five years, and the emphasis is on his powerful vocal work as much as his horn playing. There are reminders of his travels to Nigeria and meetings with Fela Kuti on Shango, his visits to Kinshasa with Congo Women, while the South African township jive includes a stirring reworking of The Rooster and the gutsy KwaZulu. At almost 80 minutes, it's a long and varied set."

== Track listing ==
No.	Title	Writer(s)	Length
1.	"Shuffle & Bow"	Masekela	4:16
2.	"Been Such a Long Time Gone"	Masekela	4:33
3.	"Shango"	Kunle Ayo, Remi Kabaka, Masekela	5:22
4.	"Congo Women" (feat. Tresor, Dice Makgothi, Kabomo)	Selema Makgothi, Hugh Masekela, Tresor Riziki	8:33
5.	"The Rooster" (feat. Themba Mokoena)	Traditional	4:14
6.	"One of These Days"	Stewart Levine, Sunny Levine	4:21
7.	"KwaZulu" (feat. Themba Mokoena)	Masekela	5:33
8.	"In an Age" (feat. Alekesam)	Sunny Levine, Hugh Masekela, Sal Masekela, Selema Masekela	5:24
9.	"Makeba" (feat. Themba Mokoena)	Masekela	6:00
10.	"Heaven in You" (feat. J'something)	Joao Da Fonseca, Hugh Masekela	4:12
11.	"Don't Go Lose It Baby" (feat. Dice Makgothi)	Stewart Levine, Hugh Masekela	5:47
12.	"Tapera" (feat. Oliver Mtukudzi)	Hugh Masekela, Oliver Mtukudzi	5:15
13.	"Alright"	Masekela	5:31
14.	"Tonight, Tonight, Tonight" (feat. Khanyo)	Masekela	6:17
15.	"Exile"	Masekela	4:07
Total length:			1:19:25
