= Still Grazing (album) =

Compilation album by Hugh Masekela
- Released: May 11, 2004
- Recorded: October 1966 – April 1974
- Genre: Jazz
- Length: 59:54
- Label: Blue Thumb Records B002442-02
- Producer: Stewart Levine

Hugh Masekela chronology
The Collection (2003)	Still Grazing (2004)	Revival (2005)

Professional ratings
Review scores
Source	Rating
AllMusic	4.5/5 stars
The Encyclopedia of Popular Music	3/5 stars
All About Jazz	3.5/5 stars

Still Grazing is a 2004 compilation album by South African jazz trumpeter Hugh Masekela. The album is a retrospective collection of his compositions recorded over the period 1966–1974. The album is the soundtrack to Masekela's autobiography of the same name.

== Reception ==
Eric Ianelli of All About Jazz wrote: "Musically speaking, Still Grazing is strong; but then, in making a case for Masekela's career, it ought to be. It starts off with 'Child of the Earth,' something of an acquired taste when it comes to vocals, and it features the vibrant 'Ha Lese Le Di Khanna' and the noteworthy cover of Antonio Carlos Jobim's 'Felicidade,' all from The Emancipation of Hugh Masekela (1966). There is, of course, 'Grazing in the Grass,' and the equally rousing 'Up, Up, and Away.' Recorded in the early 1970s, 'Languta,' 'Been Such a Long Time Gone' and 'Stimela (Coal Train)' draw on reggae as much as jazz and Masekela's characteristic musical flavorings of the townships. Thus Masekela's growth is in evidence, although the disc's twenty unused minutes could easily have been filled to provide a more complete view. Together 'Puffin' on down the Track' and 'Riot' total under five minutes."

Hunter Felt of PopMatters said: "Still Grazing fails as a comprehensive collection, but it does provide what the album’s subtitle suggests: a true 'musical journey' through a variety of styles."

== Track listing ==
No.	Title	Writer(s)	Length
1.	"Child of the Earth"	Masekela	4:43
2.	"Ha Lese le Di Khanna"	Caiphus Semenya	6:47
3.	"Felicidade"	Antônio Carlos Jobim, Vinícius de Moraes	10:14
4.	"Up, Up and Away"	Jimmy Webb	5:35
5.	"Bajabula Bonke (The Healing Song)"	Miriam Makeba	6:31
6.	"Grazing in the Grass"	Harry Elston, Philemon Hou, Hugh Masekela	2:38
7.	"Gold"	Masekela	4:10
8.	"Mace and Grenades"	Masekela	3:56
9.	"Languta"	Masekela	4:51
10.	"Been Such a Long Time Gone"	Masekela	4:01
11.	"Stimela (Coal Train)"	Masekela	6:28
Total length:			59:54

== Notes ==
=== Recording locations ===
- Tracks 1 2 3 were recorded in October 1966 at Gold Star Studios in Hollywood.
- Track 4 was recorded on September 19, 1967, at the Whisky a Go Go in Los Angeles.
- Track 5 was recorded on March 14, 1968, at Gold Star Studios in Hollywood.
- Track 6 was recorded on March 13, 1968, at Gold Star Studios in Hollywood.
- Tracks 7 8 were recorded in September 1968 in Los Angeles.
- Track 9 was recorded in July 1973 at EMI Studios in Lagos, Nigeria.
- Tracks 10 11 were recorded in March–April 1974 at Wally Heider Studios in Los Angeles.

=== Previous releases ===
- Tracks 1 2 3 were originally released on The Emancipation of Hugh Masekela (1966).
- Track 4 was originally released on Hugh Masekela Is Alive and Well at the Whisky (1967).
- Tracks 5 6 were originally released on The Promise of a Future (1968).
- Tracks 7 8 were originally released on Masekela (1969).
- Track 9 was originally released on Introducing Hedzoleh Soundz (1973).
- Tracks 10 11 were originally released on I Am Not Afraid (1974).
