= Waiting for the Rain (album) =

Studio album by Hugh Masekela
- Released: 1985
- Studio: Battery Studios Mobile, Botswana
- Genre: Jazz
- Label: Jive Afrika HIP 25
- Producer: Hugh Masekela, Stewart Levine

Hugh Masekela chronology
Techno-Bush (1984)	Waiting for the Rain (1985)	Tomorrow (1987)

Professional ratings
Review scores
Source	Rating
The Encyclopedia of Popular Music	3/5 stars
Allmusic	3/5 stars

Waiting for the Rain is a 1985 studio album by South African jazz trumpeter Hugh Masekela.

== Background ==
The album features a constellation of local African stars, most notably Bheki Mseleku on tenor saxophone and keyboards, and includes a cover of Fela Kuti's classic song "Lady". The album is dedicated to his mother, Pauline Bowers Masekela. Many tracks from this album were later included in his 2002 live album Live at the BBC.

== Track listing ==
No.	Title	Writer(s)	Length
1.	"Lady"	Fela Anikulapo Kuti	6:36
2.	"Politician"	Hugh Masekela	6:13
3.	"Tonight"	Masekela	4:42
4.	"The Joke of Life" (Brinca De Vivre)	Guilherme Arantes, John Lucien	5:08
5.	"Run No More" (A Vuo Mo)	Masekela	5:05
6.	"Coal Train" (Stimela)	Masekela	7:40
7.	"Ritual Dancer"	Masekela	4:50
8.	"Zulu Wedding"	Masekela	4:28

== Personnel ==
Band

- Hugh Masekela – lead vocals, flugelhorn, trumpet
- Francis Fuster – congas
- Mopati Tsienyane – drums
- Obert Oaki – bass
- John Giblin – bass (track 4)
- David Charles – drums (track 4)
- John Selolwane – guitar
- Banjo Mosele – rhythm guitar
- Tsepo Tshola – lead vocals (track 3)
- Anneline Malebo – lead vocals (track 3)
- Barney Rachabane – alto saxophone
- Bheki Mseleku – tenor saxophone, keyboards
- Peter Harris – synthesizer
- Thabo Mashishi – trumpet (track 5)

Production

- Stewart Levine – co-producer
- Anjali Dutt – engineer
- Fiona Macpherson – photography
- Anjali Dutt – mixing
- Bryan New – mixing
- James Mtume – mixing
