= Notes of Life =

Studio album by Hugh Masekela
- Released: 8 January 1996
- Studio: Johannesburg, South Africa
- Genre: Jazz
- Label: Columbia 484450 2
- Producer: Hugh Masekela

Hugh Masekela chronology
Stimela (1994)	Notes of Life (1996)	Black to the Future (1998)

Professional ratings
Review scores
Source	Rating
The Encyclopedia of Popular Music	3/5 stars

Notes of Life is a 1996 studio album by the South African jazz trumpeter Hugh Masekela. The album was recorded in Johannesburg, South Africa, and released by the Columbia label. Sony Music re-released the album in 1999 as a CD.

== Track listing ==
No.	Title	Writer(s)	Length
1.	"Mama"	Trevor Gordon, Hugh Masekela, Cedric Sampson
2.	"Heart Breaker"	Masekela
3.	"Moments of Love"	Masekela
4.	"Father of Our Nation"	Cedric Sampson
5.	"Whooh! Africa"	Masekela
6.	"No More Cryin'"	Masekela
7.	"Talking Thoughts"	Masekela
8.	"Bone Thru the Nose"	Masekela
9.	"Baby Ngiya Ku Thanda"	Masekela
10.	"Somebody Is Stealin' My Car"	Masekela
11.	"Thank You Madiba"	Masekela
