= Trumpet Africaine =

Studio album by Hugh Masekela
- Released: August 1962
- Studio: New York City
- Genre: Jazz
- Length: 29:00
- Label: Mercury MG20797
- Producer: Bob Bollard

Hugh Masekela chronology
| Trumpet Africaine (1962) | Grrr (1965) |

Professional ratings
Review scores
| Source | Rating |
|---|---|
| AllMusic | 3/5 stars |
| The Encyclopedia of Popular Music | 4/5 stars |

Trumpet Africaine: The New Beat from South Africa is the debut studio record (LP) by South African musician Hugh Masekela. It was recorded in New York City and released in August 1962 via Mercury Records. The album was released whilst Masekela was still in school.

== Reception ==
A reviewer of Dusty Groove noted: "The jazz component of the album is quite high, and all the playing is fairly lively – which makes for a fresh album that stands out strongly in Hugh's early catalog."

== Track listing ==
| No. | Title | Writer(s) | Length |
|---|---|---|---|
| 1. | "Satisfying Song" | Miriam Makeba | 2:04 |
| 2. | "Merci Bon Die" | Frantz Casseus | 2:18 |
| 3. | "House of the Rising Sun" | | 2:52 |
| 4. | "Sit Down (Lord, I Can't Sit Down)" | | 3:00 |
| 5. | "He's Gone Away" | | 2:22 |
| 6. | "Click Song" | Miriam Makeba | 2:29 |
| 7. | "Guinean Song" | Miriam Makeba, Hugh Masekela | 2:12 |
| 8. | "Ox Drivers Song" | | 2:38 |
| 9. | "Umhome" | Miriam Makeba, Hugh Masekela | 2:39 |
| 10. | "Magwalandini" | Miriam Makeba, Hugh Masekela | 2:21 |
| 11. | "Morning of the Carnival" (Theme from Black Orpheus) | Luiz Bonfá, Ross Jungnickel | 2:01 |
| 12. | "Wimoweh" | Solomon Linda | 2:18 |
| Total length: | | | 29:00 |

== Personnel ==
- Hugh Masekela – flugelhorn, trumpet, vocals
- Hugo Montenegro – arranging, conducting
- Bob Simpson – engineer
- Ed Begly – tape master
- Peter Perri – cover, liner photos
