= Time (Hugh Masekela album) =

Studio album by Hugh Masekela
- Released: 5 November 2002
- Studio: Johannesburg, South Africa
- Genre: Jazz
- Length: 1:09:13
- Label: Sony Music Distribution 5082952; Columbia Records CDCOL 8199
- Producer: Khaya Mahlangu, Makhaya Mahlangu, Blondie Makhene

Hugh Masekela chronology
Grazing in the Grass (2001)	Time (2002)	Live at the BBC (2002)

Alternative cover
- Columbia Records cover

Professional ratings
Review scores
Source	Rating
AllMusic	3/5 stars
The Encyclopedia of Popular Music	3/5 stars
The Penguin Guide to Jazz	2.5/4 stars

Time is a 2002 studio album by South African jazz trumpeter, Hugh Masekela. The album was recorded in Johannesburg, South Africa, and released via Sony and Columbia labels.

== Reception ==
Chris Nickson of AllMusic wrote: "From South African gospel to the slightly rougher feel of mbaqanga, and even the more contemporary kwaito (South Africa's disco-fied version of hip-hop) on 'Old People, Young Folks,' this album keeps its feet on the ground at home. About the only thing missing is that Masekela focuses more on his gritty, warm vocals, rather than his excellent trumpet playing. But he seems happy enough with that, and the sense of jubilation surrounding the disc glows peacefully."

== Awards ==
Time won Masekela the South African Music Award in best producer (together with other producers) and best male artist nominations.

== Track listing ==
No.	Title	Writer(s)	Length
1.	"Send Me"	Hugh Masekela, Peter Mokoena, Sello "Chicco" Twala	6:01
2.	"Happy Mama"	Hugh Masekela	4:50
3.	"Conchita"	Hugh Masekela	6:57
4.	"Ce Soir"	Hugh Masekela	6:40
5.	"Mamoshaba"	Hugh Masekela	5:49
6.	"Magic"	Hugh Masekela	6:19
7.	"Thimlela"	Elijah Nkwanyana	7:44
8.	"Saduva"	Mackay Davashe	4:57
9.	"Part of a Whole"	Caiphus Semenya	6:20
10.	"Change"	Blondie Makhene, Hugh Masekela, Mbongeni Ngema	6:48
11.	"Old People, Old Folks"	Hugh Masekela, Sphumele Sibeko	6:48
Total length:			1:09:13
