= Revival (Hugh Masekela album) =

Studio album by Hugh Masekela
- Released: 24 May 2005
- Studio: Creative Kingdom Studios, Johannesburg; SABC Studios, Johannesburg
- Genre: Jazz
- Length: 1:10:44
- Label: Heads Up International HUCD 3093
- Producer: Godfrey Pilane, Zwai Bala

Hugh Masekela chronology
Still Grazing (2004)	Revival (2005)	Almost Like Being in Jazz (2005)

Professional ratings
Review scores
Source	Rating
AllMusic	3.5/5 stars
All About Jazz	2.5/5 stars
The Penguin Guide to Jazz	3/4 stars
Tom Hull	B+

Revival is a studio album by South African jazz trumpeter Hugh Masekela. The album was released on 24 May 2005 on the Heads Up International label.

== Reception ==
Brian Soergel of Jazz Times mentioned: "Revival continues the paradigm established long ago: Take a couple of nice instrumentals, mix in a traditional song or two and add a few tracks addressing social concerns. But Masekela’s flugelhorn talent is so vast that it’s a shame that he can’t figure out a way to offer a CD that connects with his jazz roots, a la Chris Botti's When I Fall in Love."

Jim Santella of All About Jazz wrote: "Throughout much of the album, however, the trumpeter's tone and emphasis remain weak. His vocalist guests take center stage, as Masekela weaves in cornet and flugelhorn melodies behind them. The full force of his flugelhorn tone remains hidden and a bit off the mark. This revival of South African music does not revive his tone and technique. Nor does his singing add anything musical to the tour. Nevertheless, Masekela's heartstrings are showing, and you can't help but love the warmth that he endows on his country's cultural change."

== Track listing ==
No.	Title	Writer(s)	Length
1.	"After Tears"	Ezbie Moilwa - Sebetsa Music	5:20
2.	"Woman of the Sun"	Masekela	5:35
3.	"Spring"	Masekela	7:22
4.	"District Six"	Masekela	6:21
5.	"Open the Door"	Masekela	7:07
6.	"Nontsokolo"	Masekela	5:56
7.	"Fresh Air"	Zwai Bala	5:52
8.	"Smoke"	Masekela	4:51
9.	"Ibala Lam"	Masekela	5:11
10.	"Sleep"	Masekela	5:39
11.	"For the Love of You"	Isley Brothers	4:51
12.	"Working Underground"	Masekela	6:43

== Personnel ==
- Hugh Masekela – vocals, flugelhorn, keyboards
- Malaika – vocals
- Zwai Bala – vocals
- Corlea – vocals
- Jimmy Dludlu – guitar
- John Selolwane – guitar
- Themba Mokeona – guitar
- Lawrence Matshiza – guitar
- Khaya Mahlangu – flute, tenor saxophone
- Moses Khumalo – alto saxophone
- Godfrey Pilane – keyboards
- Ezbie Moilwa - Keyboards
- Ngoako Manamela – vibraphone
- Lucas Senyatso – bass guitar
- Sello Montwedi – drums
- Francis Fuster – percussion
