= Hope (Hugh Masekela album) =

Live album by Hugh Masekela
- Released: 1 February 1994
- Recorded: 30 July – 1 August 1993
- Studio: Blues Alley, Washington DC
- Genre: Jazz
- Length: 1:13:34
- Label: Triloka Records (TRICD82020)
- Producer: Hugh Masekela, K.D. Kagel

Hugh Masekela chronology
Beatin' Aroun de Bush (1992)	Hope (1994)	Stimela (1994)

Professional ratings
Review scores
Source	Rating
Allmusic	4/5 stars
The Encyclopedia of Popular Music	3/5 stars
The Penguin Guide to Jazz	3/4 stars
The Rolling Stone Jazz & Blues Album Guide	4.5/5 stars

Hope is a 1994 live album by South African jazz trumpeter Hugh Masekela.

== Reception ==
Richard S. Ginell of Allmusic wrote: "Now happily resettled in South Africa, Masekela assembled a seven-piece group there and recorded an informal guided tour of his life and repertoire live in Washington D.C.'s Blues Alley. The songs stretch over a period of nearly five decades and several countries and composers -- from an incantatory Alexandria township tune, 'Languta,' which he learned in 1947, to a fairly ordinary piece written by keyboardist Themba Mkhize in 1993, 'Until When.' 'Abangoma' starts the CD out on the right track, hearkening back to the early fusion of African music and jazz that Masekela was playing back in 1966."

== Track listing ==
No.	Title	Writer(s)	Length
1.	"Abangoma (The Healers)"	Miriam Makeba	4:59
2.	"Uptownship"	Hugh Masekela	4:51
3.	"Mandela (Bring Him Back Home)"	Hugh Masekela	5:09
4.	"Grazing in the Grass"	Harry Elston, Philemon Hou	3:27
5.	"Lady"	Fela Kuti	7:00
6.	"Until When"	Themba Mkhize	4:08
7.	"Languta"	Hugh Masekela	8:04
8.	"Nomali"	Caiphus Semenya	8:55
9.	"Market Place"	Hugh Masekela	5:28
10.	"Ntyilo Ntyilo (The Love Bird)"	Alan Salinga	5:55
11.	"Ha le Se (The Dowry Song)"	Caiphus Semenya	5:38
12.	"Stimela (The Coal Train)"	Hugh Masekela	10:00
Total length:			01:13:34

== Personnel ==
- Hugh Masekela – flugelhorn, trumpet
- Damon Duewhite – drums
- Bakithi Kumalo – bass, vocals
- Lawrence Matshiza – guitar, vocals
- Themba Mkhize – keyboards, vocals
- Remi Kabaka – percussion, vocals
- Ngenekhaya Mahlanghu – saxophone, flute, vocals, percussion
- Los Ballederos Hornas Africanos De Townsheep – backing vocals
