= Grazing in the Grass: The Best of Hugh Masekela =

Compilation album by Hugh Masekela
- Released: October 16, 2001
- Genre: Jazz
- Length: 1:13:56
- Label: Columbia Records CK 85759
- Producer: Hugh Masekela, Cedric Samson, Mthunzi Namba

Hugh Masekela chronology
Sixty (2000)	Grazing in the Grass: The Best of Hugh Masekela (2001)	Time (2002)

Professional ratings
Review scores
Source	Rating
AllMusic	4/5 stars
The Encyclopedia of Popular Music	4/5 stars
The Penguin Guide to Jazz	3/4 stars

Grazing in the Grass: The Best of Hugh Masekela is a 2001 compilation album by South African jazz trumpeter Hugh Masekela. The album was released via the Columbia label. This is a retrospective collection that includes 14 tracks by Masekela.

== Reception ==
Bruce Eder of AllMusic noted: "This release is superb, but also a little confusing -- it is, as its packaging suggests, a magnificent retrospective of a global jazz legend, despite the fact that it must, of necessity, leave some holes in a 14-song selection intended to sum up a 40-year career. What isn't clear until one opens it, however, is that little of what's here -- none of it, in fact -- consists of the original recordings; rather, these are re-recordings done for Columbia in much more recent times. And that's not necessarily bad, as Masekela has lost little of his fire over the ensuing four decades and did get to do these tracks under ideal conditions."

== Track listing ==
No.	Title	Writer(s)	Length
1.	"Grazing in the Grass"	Harry Elston, Philemon Hou	2:55
2.	"Vasco da Gama (The Sailor Man)"	Hugh Masekela	4:23
3.	"Khauleza"	Dorothy Masuka	5:17
4.	"Ziph' Inkomo"	Letta Mbulu, Caiphus Semenya	6:46
5.	"Mama"	Trevor Gordon, Hugh Masekela, Cedric Samson	5:03
6.	"Chileshe"	Hugh Masekela	6:19
7.	"Market Place"	Hugh Masekela	5:55
8.	"Don't Go Lose It Baby"	Hugh Masekela	6:52
9.	"Strawberries"	Hugh Masekela	4:56
10.	"Thanayi"	Nomunde Sihawu	5:25
11.	"African Secret Society"	Hugh Masekela	5:30
12.	"Ha Lese (Le Di Khanna)"	Caiphus Semenya	4:26
13.	"Bring Him Back Home (Nelson Mandela)"	Hugh Masekela, Michael Timothy	4:44
14.	"Stimela (Coal Train)"	Hugh Masekela	5:25
Total length:			1:13:56

== Personnel ==
- Hugh Masekela – flugelhorn, trumpet, producer
- Vusi Khumalo – drums
- Don Laka – various instruments
- Makhaya Mahlangu – flute, saxophone
- Kenny Mathaba – guitar
- Cedric Samson – drums, percussion, producer
- John Selolwane – guitar
