= The Best of Hugh Masekela on Novus =

Greatest hits album by Hugh Masekela
- Released: May 18, 1999
- Genre: Jazz
- Length: 57:05
- Label: RCA Records CDRCA(VM) 3074
- Producer: Hugh Masekela

Hugh Masekela chronology
Black to the Future (1996)	The Best of Hugh Masekela on Novus (1999)	Sixty (2000)

Professional ratings
Review scores
Source	Rating
Allmusic	3/5 stars

The Best of Hugh Masekela on Novus is an album by South African jazz trumpeter Hugh Masekela. This is a collection of his best tracks recorded for Novus label.

== Track listing ==
No.	Title	Writer(s)	Length
1.	"Emavungweni"	Ndikho Xaba	4:31
2.	"Sekunjalo"	Hugh Masekela	7:24
3.	"Polina"	Hugh Masekela, Dudu Pukwana	6:57
4.	"Ngena"	Bakithi Kumalo	0:51
5.	"Batsumi (Mayibuye I Afrika)"	Tony Cedras	7:35
6.	"No Woman, No Cry"	Vincent Ford, Bob Marley	5:24
7.	"Elijah"	Hugh Masekela	5:28
8.	"Ngena-Ngena"	Tony Cedras	6:07
9.	"Languta"	Hugh Masekela	6:47
10.	"Uptownship"	Hugh Masekela	6:01
Total length:			57:05
