= Sixty (Hugh Masekela album) =

Studio album by Hugh Masekela
- Released: June 13, 2000
- Studio: Down Town Studio, Johannesburg, South Africa; BOP Recording Studios, Mmabatho, South Africa
- Genre: Jazz
- Length: 1:10:07
- Label: Shanachie Records Shanachie 5070
- Producer: Don Laka

Hugh Masekela chronology
The Best of Hugh Masekela on Novus (1999)	Sixty (2000)	Grazing in the Grass (2001)

Sixty is a 2000 studio album by South African jazz trumpeter Hugh Masekela. It was recorded in Johannesburg, South Africa, and released via the Shanachie label.

== Reception ==
Professional ratings
Review scores
Source	Rating
AllMusic	4/5 stars
The Encyclopedia of Popular Music	3/5 stars
The Penguin Guide to Jazz	3/4 stars

Adam Greenberg of AllMusic stated: "Presumably to commemorate his 60th birthday, Hugh Masekela released an album of primarily African works. The album starts with a tribute to Fela, a kindred spirit in African horn playing and a friend of Masekela. After that, it moves on through a number of traditional songs and trips down memory lane... From time to time, the music seems to slip into something of a contemporary Harry Belafonte-esque sound (which perhaps might not be completely surprising, given the repeated collaborations between Belafonte and Miriam Makeba, coupled with Masekela's marriage to Makeba). Despite (or due to) any such similarities that may arise, this is international pop at its best."

Chris Wodskou of Exclaim! wrote: "Hugh Masekela’s 60th birthday is cause for celebration, but perhaps the best way to observe this milestone would be to reflect back on his storied career, not to pick up the CD that commemorates his birthday. A giant in the greatly underrated South African jazz scene of the ’60s who went on to international renown in world music circles in the ’70s and ’80s, Masekela’s latest has him in a somewhat complacent frame of mind, keeping the heat on low and his signature funky undertones tepid."

== Track listing ==
No.	Title	Writer(s)	Length
1.	"Fela"	Remi Kabaka, Hugh Masekela	5:35
2.	"Thanayi"	Hugh Masekela	5:27
3.	"Shango"	Remi Kabaka, Hugh Masekela	5:31
4.	"Mamoriri"	Don Laka, Traditional	4:20
5.	"Mbombela"	Welcome Duru	5:27
6.	"Mgewundini"	Martha Mdenge	5:18
7.	"Nomalizo"	Victor Ntoni	6:31
8.	"Bo Masekela"	Caiphus Semenya	5:20
9.	"Tamati So So"	Hugh Masekela, Traditional	7:26
10.	"Ziphi 'Nkomo"	Letta Mbulu, Caiphus Semenya	6:49
11.	"Lizzy"	Hugh Masekela	6:13
12.	"Been Such a Long Time Gone"	Hugh Masekela	4:32
13.	"Koshana"	Don Laka	1:38
Total length:			01:10:07
