= Jabulani (album) =

Studio album by Hugh Masekela
- Released: 31 January 2012
- Studio: Pretoria, South Africa
- Genre: Jazz
- Length: 59:25
- Label: Listen 2 183324
- Producer: Don Laka

Hugh Masekela chronology
Phola (2008)	Jabulani (2012)	Friends (2012)

Jabulani is a studio album by South African jazz trumpeter Hugh Masekela. The record was released on 31 January 2012 via Listen 2 label in the USA and via Gallo Record Company label in South Africa. The Zulu word jabulani translates as: to be happy, or to bring joy and happiness. Recorded in Pretoria, South Africa, the album is a collection of re-interpreted traditional South African wedding songs.

== Critical reception ==
Professional ratings
Review scores
Source	Rating
AllMusic	3.5/5 stars
All About Jazz	3.5/5 stars

Matt Collar of AllMusic stated: "Inspired by South African wedding traditions remembered from his youth, trumpeter Hugh Masekela's 2012 album Jabulani is a celebratory mix of jazz, pop, and African sounds. Backed by a bevy of talented musicians even including a small choir, Masekela is in top form throughout this celebratory album."

Thomas Carroll of All About Jazz noted: "At the age of 72, South African vocalist and multi-instrumentalist Hugh Masekela is still making music with as much energy and passion as he did in the days of 'Grazin' in the Grass' at the height of his international fame in the 1960s and 1970s. Historically, Masekela has used his music as a form of social and political activism to combat issues like Apartheid. Jabulani strays from this trend of defiance and instead focuses on the joys and drawbacks of marriage, a highly ritualized and ceremonial institution in the South African village where Masekela was born... As a whole, Jabulani provides more of a snapshot of South African culture than a body of instrumental ingenuity. While the musical performance is never less than refined and professional, the message and mood of the album are clearly more important than the instrumental performance."

== Recognition ==
On 10 February 2013, Jabulani was nominated for Grammy Award for Best World Music Album. Masekela shared the nomination with Amadou & Miriam, Daniel Ho, Anoushka Shankar, and Ravi Shankar (winner).

== Track listing ==
No.	Title	Writer(s)	Length
1.	"Sossie"	Traditional	6:41
2.	"Fiela"	Traditional	5:27
3.	"Bambezela"	Traditional	4:21
4.	"Rosie My Girl"	Masekela	4:50
5.	"Iph' Indlela"	Abigail Kubheka	5:32
6.	"Tsoang Tsoang"	Jimmy Mojapelo	5:09
7.	"Scatter My Dada"	Masekela	6:28
8.	"Makoti (Bride)"	Nathi Gcabashe, Fundile Mdingi	4:34
9.	"Mfana"	Traditional	5:17
10.	"Uyeyeni"	Traditional	5:19
11.	"No Harvest (Asilimanga)"	Traditional	5:45
Total length:			59:25
