= Friends (Hugh Masekela and Larry Willis album) =

Studio album by Hugh Masekela and Larry Willis
- Released: 15 June 2012
- Studio: Pretoria, South Africa
- Genre: Jazz
- Length: 59:25
- Label: House of Masekela HOM001

Hugh Masekela and Larry Willis chronology
Jabulani (2012)	Friends (2012)	Playing @ Work (2012)

Professional ratings
Review scores
Source	Rating
The Telegraph	4/5 stars

Friends is a collaborative album by South African jazz trumpeter Hugh Masekela and American jazz pianist Larry Willis. The album is the sequel to Almost Like Being in Jazz released in 2005. Recorded in Pretoria, Friends premiered in Cape Town at the Mahogany Room in April 2012. It is a four-piece album, a 39-track boxset reworking of American jazz standards, released on the new record label, House of Masekela.
