= I Am Not Afraid =

1974 studio album by Hugh Masekela

Studio album by Hugh Masekela
- Released: 1974
- Recorded: March 1974
- Studio: Wally Heider Studios, Los Angeles, California
- Genre: Jazz
- Label: Blue Thumb BTS 6015
- Producer: Stewart Levine

Hugh Masekela chronology
Introducing Hedzoleh Soundz (1973)	I Am Not Afraid (1974)	The Boy's Doin' It (1975)

Professional ratings
Review scores
Source	Rating
AllMusic	3/5 stars
The Encyclopedia of Popular Music	3/5 stars

I Am Not Afraid is the sixteenth studio album by South African trumpeter Hugh Masekela. It was recorded in Los Angeles, California, and released in 1974. Tracks 2 and 7 were also included in Masekela's 2004 album Still Grazing.

== Reception ==
A reviewer of Dusty Groove stated: "An excellent little record from Hugh Masekela – cut right during that perfect time when he was mixing soul, funk, and just the right amount of jazz to keep things real! The record features some nice electric piano from Joe Sample, and the best cuts have a choppy funky groove. Some cuts have vocals, but the best moments are instrumental."

== Track listing ==
No.	Title	Writer(s)	Length
1.	"Night in Tunisia"	Dizzy Gillespie, Frank Paparelli	7:32
2.	"Been Such a Long Time Gone"	Hugh Masekela	4:00
3.	"In the Market Place"	Hugh Masekela	5:35
4.	"Jungle Jim"	Hugh Masekela	4:30
5.	"African Secret Society"	Hugh Masekela	5:45
6.	"Nina"	Hugh Masekela, Sekou Toure	5:40
7.	"Stimela" (Coaltrain)	Hugh Masekela	6:30

== Personnel ==
- Backing band – Hedzoleh Soundz
- Cabasa (calabash), bells, drums (bass) – Acheampong Welbeck
- Congas – James Kwaku Morton
- Congas, flute, vocals – Nat "Leepuma" Hammond
- Design, photography – Tom Wilkes
- Talking drums, percussion, vocals – Isaac Asante
- Drums (uncredited) – Stix Hooper
- Electric bass, vocals – Stanley Kwesi Todd
- Electric piano (uncredited) – Joe Sample
- Engineer – Rik Pekkonen
- Guitar – Richard Neesai "Jagger" Botchway
- Mastered by – Arnie Acosta
- Producer – Stewart Levine
- Shekere, vocals – Samuel Nortey
- Trumpet (uncredited), flugelhorn (uncredited), vocals (uncredited) – Hugh Masekela
