= Almost Like Being in Jazz =

Studio album by Hugh Masekela
- Released: 7 June 2005
- Recorded: 15–17 October 2004
- Studio: Bernie's, (Los Angeles, California)
- Genre: Jazz
- Length: 1:01:30
- Label: Chisa Records CHCD01
- Producer: Stewart Levine

Hugh Masekela chronology
| Revival (2005) | Almost Like Being in Jazz (2005) | The Chisa Years (2006) |

Almost Like Being in Jazz is a studio album by South-African jazz trumpeter Hugh Masekela. The album was released on 7 June 2005 via Chisa Records label. The album consists of 12 jazz standards. The album was also released as a double LP via Straigthahead Records. In 2012, the album was followed-up with the sequel record Friends.

== Track listing ==
| No. | Title | Writer(s) | Length |
|---|---|---|---|
| 1. | "You'll Never Know" | Harry Warren, Mack Gordon | 5:47 |
| 2. | "Answer Me, My Love" | Carl Sigman, Fred Rauch, Gerard Winkler | 4:43 |
| 3. | "Don't Explain" | Arthur Herzog Jr., Billie Holiday | 7:00 |
| 4. | "It Never Entered My Mind" | Lorenz Hart, Richard Rodgers | 3:31 |
| 5. | "Paper Moon" | Billy Rose, Harold Arlen | 4:55 |
| 6. | "Betcha By Golly Wow" | Thomas Bell | 4:37 |
| 7. | "Midnight Sun" | Lionel Hampton | 5:29 |
| 8. | "I Remember Clifford" | Benny Golson | 3:44 |
| 9. | "Smile" | Charles Chaplin, Geoffrey Parsons, John Turner | 4:26 |
| 10. | "You Don't Know What Love Is" | Don Raye, Gene DePaul | 5:44 |
| 11. | "My Ship" | Ira Gershwin, Kurt Weill | 4:20 |
| 12. | "Presente De Natal" | João Gilberto | 7:19 |
| Total length: | | | 1:01:30 |

== Personnel ==
Band

- Hugh Masekela – flugelhorn
- John Heard – bass
- Lorca Heart – drums
- Larry Willis – piano

Production

- Scott Sedillo – engineer
- Bernie Grundman – mastering
- Stewart Levine – producer
