= Herb Alpert / Hugh Masekela =

1978 studio album by Herb Alpert and Hugh Masekela

Studio album by Herb Alpert and Hugh Masekela
- Released: 1978
- Recorded: in Hollywood, California
- Genre: Jazz
- Length: 34:22
- Label: A&M SP-728; Horizon SP-728
- Producer: Caiphus Semenya, Herb Alpert, Stewart Levine

Hugh Masekela chronology
You Told Your Mama Not to Worry (1977)	Herb Alpert / Hugh Masekela (1978)	Main Event Live (1978)

Herb Alpert chronology
Greatest Hits Vol. 2 (1977)	Herb Alpert / Hugh Masekela (1978)	Main Event Live (1978)

Professional ratings
Review scores
Source	Rating
AllMusic	3/5 stars
The Encyclopedia of Popular Music	2/5 stars

Herb Alpert / Hugh Masekela is collaborative studio album by Herb Alpert and Hugh Masekela. It was recorded in Hollywood, California, and released in 1978 via A&M Records and Horizon Records labels.

== Track listing ==
No.	Title	Writer(s)	Length
1.	"Skokiaan"	Tom Glazer, August Msarurgwa	3:37
2.	"Moonza"	Caiphus Semenya, Herb Alpert	4:38
3.	"Ring Bell"	George David Weiss, Jerry Ragovoy	3:24
4.	"Happy Hanna"	Caiphus Semenya, Hotep Cecil Barnard	4:58
5.	"El Lobo" (The Wolf)	Edu Lobo	7:20
6.	"African Summer"	Caiphus Semenya	3:20
7.	"I'll Be There for You"	Caiphus Semenya	7:05

== Personnel ==
- Acoustic guitar – Tommy Tedesco (tracks: 5)
- Arranged by – Caiphus Semenya, Herb Alpert, Hugh Masekela, Stewart Levine
- Backing vocals – Caiphus Semenya, Herb Alpert, Hugh Masekela, Lani Hall, Letta Mbulu
- Bass – Chuck Domanico
- Bass – Louis Johnson (tracks: 1)
- Co-producer – Hugh Masekela
- Concertmaster – Gerald Vinci
- Design – Chuck Beeson
- Drums – Carlos Vega (tracks: 5), James Gadson, Spider Webb (tracks: 6)
- Flugelhorn – Hugh Masekela
- Flugelhorn, trumpet – Herb Alpert
- French horn – Marylin L. Robinson, Sidney Isaac Muldrow
- Guitar – Arthur Adams, Freddie Harris, Lee Ritenour
- Guitar – Arthur Adams (tracks: 7)
- Mastered by – Bernie Grundman
- Orchestrated By – Donald Cooke
- Percussion – Paulinho Da Costa
- Piano – Caiphus Semenya, Hotep Cecil Barnard
- Producer – Caiphus Semenya, Herb Alpert, Stewart Levine
- Synthesizer – Craig Hindley (tracks: 4), Michael Boddicker (tracks: 6)
- Synthesizer – Ian Underwood
- Trombone – Donald Cooke, George Bohanon
- Trombone (bass) – Maurice Spears
