= Live at the Market Theatre =

Live album by Hugh Masekela
- Released: 17 July 2007
- Recorded: June 2006
- Venue: The Market Theatre, Johannesburg
- Genre: Jazz
- Length: 2:29:42
- Label: Four Quarters Entertainment FQT-CD-1805

Hugh Masekela chronology
The Chisa Years (2006)	Live at the Market Theatre (2007)	Phola (2009)

Live at the Market Theatre is a double live album by South African jazz trumpeter Hugh Masekela. The record was released on 17 July 2007 via Four Quarters Entertainment label. The album consists of 15 tracks recorded in June 2006 during his two-and-a-half-hour concert in The Market Theatre in Johannesburg. A follow-up DVD was released on 31 July 2007.

== Critical reception ==
Professional ratings
Review scores
Source	Rating
AllMusic	4/5 stars
Tom Hull	A−

Jeff Tamarkin in his review for Jazz Times wrote: "Hugh Masekela should look less pained than he does on the cover of Live at the Market Theatre. The Johannesburg venue itself, celebrating its 30th anniversary when Masekela headlined in June 2006, is a proud symbol of the struggle against apartheid, having refused to segregate when such an act was still unheard of in South Africa. And Masekela himself, back home since the early '90s after decades in exile, remains a worshiped figure there. This event should have been a celebration. But contentment has never been a hallmark of Masekela's character, and jazz has never been just music to him, but rather the sound of a people rising above. In his hoary voice and his unflappable playing, Masekela shoulders countless historical burdens, and though there is a joyousness to be heard, his work won't be done until he's done working."

A reviewer of Rock Paper Scissors stated: "After many years spent in exile from the violence and oppression of apartheid-era South Africa, Masekela returned 17 years ago to help rebuild his homeland. Live at the Market Theatre represents Masekela's status as a musical freedom fighter in South Africa while demonstrating what he's known for best in the outside world: his energetic and groove-driven freedom sound. The Market Theatre is an apt representation of Masekela's commitment to South African identity and Pan-African nation-building."

== Track listing ==
Disc 1

No.	Title	Writer(s)	Length
1.	"Ibala Lam"	L. Morake	2:57
2.	"The Boys Doin' It"	Masekela	11:17
3.	"Ashiko"	O. J. Ekemode	9:42
4.	"Ha Le Se"	Caiphus Semenya	8:42
5.	"Stimela"	Masekela	15:03
6.	"Lady"	Fela Kuti	10:11
7.	"Grazing in the Grass"	Philimon Hou	14:42
8.	"Mandela"	Daly Gray, Masekela, Timothy Michael	6:28

Disc 2

No.	Title	Writer(s)	Length
1.	"Thuma Mina"	Masekela, P. Mokena, S. Twala	9:38
2.	"Up Township"	Masekela	7:40
3.	"Happy Mama"	Masekela	6:03
4.	"District Six"	H. Galeteng	8:47
5.	"Market Place"	Masekela	16:37
6.	"Khauleza"	Dorothy Masuka	15:21
7.	"Thanayi"	Kiri Mazeze	6:34

== Personnel ==
Band

- Hugh Masekela – flugelhorn, lead vocals
- Fana Zulu – bass guitar
- Sello Montwedi – drums
- John Selolwane – guitar, backing vocals
- Ezbie Moilwa – keyboards, backing vocals
- Arthur Tshabalala – keyboards, backing vocals
- Francis Fuster – percussion, backing vocals
- Khaya Mahlangu – saxophone, flute, backing vocals

Production

- Freddy Malesa – engineer
