= The Emancipation of Hugh Masekela =

Studio album by Hugh Masekela
- Released: 1966
- Studio: Gold Star (Hollywood, California)
- Genre: Jazz
- Length: 37:57
- Label: Chisa Records CHS-4101
- Producer: Stewart Levine

Hugh Masekela chronology
| Hugh Masekela's Next Album (1966) | The Emancipation of Hugh Masekela (1966) | Hugh Masekela's Latest (1967) |

Professional ratings
Review scores
| Source | Rating |
|---|---|
| AllMusic | 4/5 stars |
| The Encyclopedia of Popular Music | 3/5 stars |

The Emancipation of Hugh Masekela is the fifth studio album by South African jazz trumpeter Hugh Masekela. It was recorded in Los Angeles and released in 1966 via Chisa Records label. On this album he performs mostly his own songs. Tracks "Child of the Earth", "Felicidade", and "Ha Lese Le Di Khanna" were later included in his 2004 album Still Grazing.

== Reception ==
Matthew Greenwald of Allmusic stated that "South African expatriate Hugh Masekela was the architect of an extremely interesting and viable musical form, an audacious blending of South African rhythms, swing jazz, and rock & roll. Emancipation is the first American effort in this area, and it's a fantastic, soul-deep affair. With a crack band including Charlie Smalls on piano and two drummers (the original Big Black on percussion), Masekela's vocals and intense trumpet have the perfect platform from which to fly. One track in particular, 'She Doesn't Write,' is almost a template for 'Grazing in the Grass,' which was a huge hit the following year. Masekela was also involved with the Jim Dickson/Byrds/Peter Fonda crowd at the time, and that influence can be felt here as well. A perfect introduction to Hugh Masekela."

== Track listing ==
| No. | Title | Writer(s) | Length |
|---|---|---|---|
| 1. | "Chisa" | Hugh Masekela | 2:13 |
| 2. | "Why Are You Blowing My Mind?" | Hugh Masekela | 2:37 |
| 3. | "She Doesn't Write" | Hugh Masekela | 3:42 |
| 4. | "Felicidade" | Antônio Carlos Jobim, Vinicius De Moraes | 10:11 |
| 5. | "Do Me So La So So" | Hugh Masekela | 2:33 |
| 6. | "Ha Lese Le Di Khanna" | Caiphus Semenya | 6:44 |
| 7. | "What Is Wrong With Groovin'?" | Hugh Masekela | 3:01 |
| 8. | "Child of the Earth" | Hugh Masekela | 4:41 |
| 9. | "Sqo" | Hugh Masekela | 2:15 |
| Total length: | | | 37:57 |

== Personnel ==
- John Cartwright – bass
- Big Black – congas
- Chuck Carter – drums
- Stan Ross – engineer
- Gabor Halmos – photography
- Jonathan Haze – photography
- Charlie Smalls – piano
- Stewart Levine – producer
- Hugh Masekela – trumpet (uncredited)
