= The Lasting Impression of Hugh Masekela =

Live album by Hugh Masekela
- Released: December 1968
- Recorded: November 1965
- Venue: The Village Gate, New York City
- Genre: Jazz
- Label: MGM SE-4468
- Producer: Tom Wilson

Hugh Masekela chronology
Africa '68 (1968)	The Lasting Impression of Hugh Masekela (1968)	Masekela (1969)

Professional ratings
Review scores
Source	Rating
AllMusic	4/5 stars
The Encyclopedia of Popular Music	3/5 stars
The Penguin Guide to Jazz	3.5/4 stars

The Lasting Impression of Hugh Masekela is a 1968 live album by South African jazz musician Hugh Masekela.

== Background ==
The album was released by MGM Records label, which Masekela left several years ago. It was recorded at The Village Gate, New York City, in November 1965 during the same sessions as The Americanization of Ooga Booga and released as a separate album in December 1968. In 1996 Verve Records released a CD named The Lasting Impression of Ooga-Booga, which included tracks from The Americanization of Ooga Booga and five tracks from the present record without "Child of the Earth".

== Reception ==
A reviewer of Dusty Groove stated: "One of Hugh's best albums for MGM – with some tracks that are longer than his late 60s pop tunes, and which feature him stretching out more in a soulful mode, hitting some fuzzy Afro funk grooves that are very nice! Hugh's soulful trumpet is in fine fine form..." Bruce Eder of AllMusic wrote: "The remainder of Hugh Masekela's winter 1965 Village Gate set sat in the can for three years, until 'Grazing in the Grass' became a hit in 1968 on the Uni label. Then the label rushed out with the six-track Lasting Impressions of Hugh Masekela LP, which was a match musically for its predecessor, The Americanization of Ooga Booga."

== Track listing ==
No.	Title	Writer(s)	Length
1.	"Con Mucho Carino" (With Much Love)	Larry Willis	4:38
2.	"Where Are You Going?"	Hugh Masekela	7:58
3.	"Morolo"	Hugh Masekela	5:05
4.	"Bo Masekela"	Caiphus Semenya	4:55
5.	"Unohilo" (The Bird, aka Ntyilo, Ntyilo)	Alan Salenga	6:58
6.	"Child of the Earth"	Hugh Masekela	5:54

== Personnel ==
- Art direction – Acy R. Lehman
- Engineer (director) – Val Valentin
- Liner notes – Kathleen Boyle
- Photography, cover – Rudy Legname
- Photography, liner – Chuck Stewart
- Producer – Tom Wilson
