= Black to the Future (Hugh Masekela album) =

Studio album by Hugh Masekela
- Released: 10 November 1998
- Studio: Bop Recording Studios, Mafikeng, South Africa.
- Genre: Jazz
- Length: 1:07:23
- Label: Shanachie Shanachie 5056
- Producer: Hugh Masekela, Don Laka

Hugh Masekela chronology
Notes of Life (1996)	Black to the Future (1998)	The Best of Hugh Masekela on Novus (1999)

Black to the Future is a 1998 studio album by South African jazz trumpeter Hugh Masekela. The album was recorded in Mafikeng, South Africa.

== Reception ==
Professional ratings
Review scores
Source	Rating
The Encyclopedia of Popular Music	4/5 stars
Allmusic	3/5 stars
The Penguin Guide to Jazz	3/4 stars

Stephen Thomas Erlewine of AllMusic stated: "Black to the Future is a fairly standard latter-day Hugh Masekela album, falling somewhere between accessible worldbeat and tuneful fusion. Granted, Masekela has been mining this ground for some time, but there is a bit of a difference here, particularly the genuine sound of some of the polyrhythms and the way the group locks into a supple groove."

== Track listing ==
No.	Title	Writer(s)	Length
1.	"Mama Ndoro"	Hugh Masekela	5:39
2.	"The Boy's Doin' It"	Hugh Masekela	5:46
3.	"Ashiko"	Orlando Julius Ekemode, Hugh Masekela	6:04
4.	"Chileshe"	Hugh Masekela	6:19
5.	"JJC/JJD"	Don Laka, Hugh Masekela	4:37
6.	"Song of Love"	Don Laka, Hugh Masekela	5:20
7.	"Khawuleza"	Hugh Masekela, Dorothy Masuka	5:19
8.	"Child of the Earth"	Hugh Masekela	6:15
9.	"Excuse Me Baby Please!"	Hugh Masekela	5:28
10.	"Strawberries"	Hugh Masekela	4:57
11.	"Nina"	Les Ballets Africains, Hugh Masekela	5:48
12.	"Bokone"	Don Laka, Hugh Masekela	6:11
Total length:			01:07:23

== Personnel ==
Band

- Hugh Masekela – flugelhorn, backing vocals
- Jasper Cook – trombone
- Don Laka – keyboards, producing, programming
- Makhaya Mahlangu – flute, alto and tenor saxophone
- Tuli Mike Masoka – bass
- Kenny Mathaba – guitar, harmonica
- Thabo Mdluli – backing vocals
- Margaret Motsage – backing vocals
- John Selolwane – guitar, backing vocals
- Jethro Shasha – drums
- Vicky Vilakazi – backing vocals

Production

- Kentsa Mpahlwa – engineer
- Ray Staff – mastering
