= Banjo Mosele =

- Born: April 1, 1960 (age 65); Kanye, Botswana
- Occupation: Musician

Banjo Timothy Mosele (born 1 April 1960) is a guitarist, singer and composer born in Kanye, Botswana.

== Career ==
Banjo Mosele is a founding member of the Kalahari Band that backed Hugh Masekela, and Mosele toured the world with this band throughout the 1980s. He has played guitar in three of Hugh Masekela's albums, namely Techno-Bush, Waiting for the Rain, and Tomorrow. Mosele has also worked as a session musician with the likes of Jonas Gwangwa, Peter Gabriel, Julian Bahula, Bheki Mseleku and Barney Rachabane on the London music scene. While studying music at Goldsmiths College, Mosele formed and led Bushmen Don't Surf, a group that made a name in the UK performing in festivals such as WOMAD and Glastonbury, and around Europe.

Mosele released his first solo album, Badisa, in 2003 and followed its success with Movin’ On in 2005 and Nowa Days in 2008. All albums did well in his native Botswana, South Africa, England and in Norway. In 2009, Botswana Music Awards nominated him in the categories "Song of the Year", "Best Album" and "Best DVD". He won "Song of the Year" with "Ntsa E Jele Ntsanyana" (Dog eat dog).

Mosele lived in Bergen, Norway during the 1980s, where he married Siri Møll, the sister of Erik Moll. The marriage was dissolved. Their son the rapper Kamelen, released his first solo album Ambivalent (Kamelen) in 2017. Mosele has been living in Oslo, Norway since the mid 1990s, but currently resides in Botswana

== Discography ==
=== Solo albums ===
- 2003: Badisa
- 2005: Movin' On
- 2008: Nowa Days

With Bushmen Don't Surf

- 1989: Alive (Moles Records)

=== Collaborations ===
With Hugh Masekela

- 1984: Techno-Bush (Jive Afrika)
- 1985: Waiting for the Rain (Jive Afrika)
- 1987: Tomorrow (Warner Bros.)

With Barney Rachabane

- 1984: Blow Barney Blow (Jive Afrika)

With Sampeace Brown & His Hit Company

- 1996: Ice Cube Loving Single (T-Kay)
