= Zamajobe Sithole =

South African singer-songwriter and guitarist

Zamajobe
- Born: Zamajobe Sithole; Frankfort, Free State, South Africa
- Origin: Vosloorus, Gauteng, South Africa
- Genres: Afro-soul, jazz fusion, neo soul, R&B
- Occupations: Singer; songwriter; guitarist
- Instruments: Vocals; guitar
- Years active: 2003–present
- Labels: Sony BMG; Giant Steps

Zamajobe (born Zamajobe Sithole) is a South African singer-songwriter and guitarist. She gained public recognition as a top 10 finalist on the second season of Idols South Africa in 2003.

== Early life ==
Zamajobe Sithole was born in Namahadi, Frankfort in South Africa's Free State province. Her parents, Nombuso and Themba Sithole, relocated to Johannesburg for work opportunities and settled permanently in Vosloorus, Gauteng.

Sithole was raised in a religious household and it was her mother who introduced her to gospel music while she was young. Zamajobe joined her local church choir at the age of nine, where her vocal talent was noticed by gospel artist and preacher, Pastor Benjamin Dube, who became her early musical mentor. She later convinced her father when she was 17 years old to buy her a guitar, which she taught herself to play and used to begin composing her own music.

== Music career ==
=== 2003: Idols South Africa ===
In 2003, Zamajobe competed in the second season of the reality television competition Idols South Africa where she was voted out in 7th place. Her performances garnered her a fanbase and also caught the attention of judge Dave Thompson, who was then the Marketing and A&R Director of BMG Africa. Recognizing her potential, Thompson signed her to BMG and offered her studio time to record and develop her original compositions.

=== 2004–2007: Ndawo Yami and breakthrough ===
In 2004, Zamajobe released her debut album, Ndawo Yami ("My Place"),co-written and produced alongside guitarist Erik Paliani, the album blended acoustic folk, jazz, and traditional African sounds. Ndawo Yami became a commercial success, quickly achieving Gold sales status in South Africa (selling in excess of 25,000 units) and eventually going Multi-Platinum. The album attracted huge radio airplay and included songs like "Magic," "Hey Hey Hey," and the main track "Ndawo Yami".

At the 11th annual South African Music Awards (SAMA) in 2005, Zamajobe received four major nominations and won the Best Newcomer award. In 2006, she received international recognition when she was nominated for Best African Act at the MTV Europe Music Awards.

=== 2008–present: Continued output and 20-year tour ===
Zamajobe followed her debut with Ndoni Yamanzi, in 2008. In 2024, she launched her anniversary tour celebrating 20 years of her album Ndawo Yami where she performed in Johannesburg, Durban, and Cape Town.

== Discography ==
=== Studio albums ===
- Ndawo Yami (2004, Sony BMG / Giant Steps)
- Ndoni Yamanzi (2008)
- Thula Ndivile (2013)
- Umi (2024)

== Awards and nominations ==
| Year | Event | Category | Nominated work | Result |
|---|---|---|---|---|
| 2005 | South African Music Awards | Best Newcomer | Ndawo Yami | Won |
| 2005 | South African Music Awards | Best Jazz Vocal Album | Ndawo Yami | Nominated |
| 2005 | South African Music Awards | Best Joint Composition (with Erik Pilani) | Ndawo Yami | Nominated |
| 2005 | South African Music Awards | Best Engineer (Robin Kohl) | Ndawo Yami | Nominated |
| 2006 | MTV Europe Music Awards | Best African Act | Herself | Nominated |
