= Amandla!: A Revolution in Four-Part Harmony =

- Official film poster
- Directed by: Lee Hirsch
- Produced by: Sherry Simpson Dean & Desiree Markgraaff
- Cinematography: Brand Jordaan; Ivan Leathers; Clive Sacke
- Edited by: Johanna Demetrakas
- Production company: ATO Pictures
- Distributed by: Artisan Entertainment
- Release date: 2002
- Countries: South Africa; United States
- Languages: English; Zulu

Amandla!: A Revolution in Four-Part Harmony is a 2002 documentary film depicting the struggles of black South Africans against the injustices of Apartheid through the use of music. The film takes its name from the Zulu and Xhosa word amandla, which means power.

The film was produced by Sherry Simpson Dean, Desiree Markgraaff and Lee Hirsch. Simpson Dean and Hirsch also produced the film's soundtrack of the same name. The collection of authentic South African "Freedom Songs" was executive produced by Dave Matthews and his label ATO Records.

== Synopsis ==
South African musicians, playwrights, poets and activists recall the struggle against apartheid from the 1940s to the 1990s that stripped black citizens of South Africa of basic human rights, and the important role that music played in that struggle. The documentary uses a mixture of interviews, musical performances and historical film footage. Among the South Africans who take part are Miriam Makeba, Abdullah Ibrahim, Hugh Masekela, Vusi Mahlasela and others.

The freedom songs heard in the film have an important historical context. Particularly in the United States, freedom songs have referred to protest songs of the abolitionist, civil rights, and labor movements. Yet, in South Africa, the songs take on a different meaning, referring to a unique collection of songs tied to the struggle for racial equality during the 20th century. Stylistically, freedom songs originated in choir as a unifying and prevalent genre that combined southern African singing traditions with Christian hymns. Most of the songs have simple melodies and are sung a cappella. More importantly, they are composed and sung in groups, and often reflect changing political circumstances and attitudes.

The film is bookmarked by the exhumation of the remains of Vuyisile Mini, trade union organizer, member of the African National Congress, and composer of "Beware Verwoerd" and other protest songs. Mini was executed by the apartheid regime in 1964.

== Release ==
Cinemax/HBO released Amandla! to television.

== Reception ==
On review aggregator website Rotten Tomatoes, the film holds an approval rating of 83% based on 64 reviews, with an average rating of 7.1/10.

== Awards ==
The film won the Audience Award and the Freedom of Expression Award at the 2002 Sundance Film Festival, where it was also nominated for the Grand Jury Prize. It also won awards at several other film festivals, including those in Telluride, Colorado, Durban International Film Festival, South Africa, and Sydney, Australia.

Amandla! was nominated for five News and Documentary Emmy Awards in 2003, winning one for Outstanding Individual Achievement in a Craft: Research.

== Soundtrack ==
1. "AMANDLA!", Protest meeting, Johannesburg
2. "When You Come Back", Vusi Mahlasela
3. "Lizobuya", Mbongeni Ngema
4. "Meadowlands", Nancy Jacobs and sisters
5. "Sad Times", Bad Times, The Original Cast of King Kong
6. "Senzeni Na?", Vusi Mahlasela & Harmonious Serenade Choir
7. "Beware Verwoerd (Naants’ Indod’ Emnyama)", Miriam Makeba
8. "Y’zinga", Robben-Island Prison Singers
9. "Stimela", Hugh Masekela
10. "Injamblo/Hambani Kunye Ne – Vangeli", Pretoria Central Prison
11. "Mannenberg", Abdullah Ibrahim
12. "Nkosi Sikelel' iAfrika", Soweto Community Hall
13. "Thina Lomhlaba Siwugezi", Vusi Mahlasela
14. "Mayibuye", Vusi Mahlasela
15. "Thina Sizwe", SABC Choir
16. "Folk Vibe No. 1", Tananas
17. "Dabula Ngesi'bam", Soweto Community Hall
18. "Sobahiya Abazali Ekhaya", Amandla Group
19. "Bring Him Back Home (Nelson Mandela)", Hugh Masekela
20. "Did You Hear That Sound? (Dreamtime Improv)", Abdullah Ibrahim
21. "S'bali", Joe Nina
22. "Makuliwe", Soweto Community HalL
23. "Bahleli Bonke", Miriam Makeba
24. "Kuzobenjani Na?", Vusi Mahlasela
25. "You Strike The Rock...", Sophie Mgcina and Dolly Rathebe
26. "The Untold Story", Sibongile Khumalo with Themba Mkhize
27. "Iyo", Harmonious Serenade Choir
28. "Usilethela Uxolo (Nelson Mandela Brings Us Peace)", The African National Congress Choir
29. "Toyi - Toyi Introduction/Kramat", Abdullah Ibrahim
