= The Collection (Hugh Masekela album) =

Compilation album by Hugh Masekela
- Released: 7 October 2003
- Genre: Jazz
- Length: 1:07:38
- Label: Spectrum Music 981 022-7

Hugh Masekela chronology
Live at the BBC (2002)	The Collection (2003)	Still Grazing (2004)

Professional ratings
Review scores
Source	Rating
The Encyclopedia of Popular Music	3/5 stars

The Collection is a compilation album by South African trumpeter Hugh Masekela. It was released on 7 October 2003 via Spectrum Music label.

== Track listing ==
No.	Title	Writer(s)	Length
1.	"Johannesburg Hi-Lite Jive"	Christopher Songxaka	4:00
2.	"The Boy's Doin' It"	Adaloja Gboyega, Stanley Todd Kwesi, Hugh Masekela, Yaw Opoku, Papa Frankie Todd, Odinga "Guy" Warren	4:01
3.	"Ade"	Caiphus Semenya	3:48
4.	"Colonial Man"	Hugh Masekela	5:04
5.	"Hi-Life"	Hugh Masekela, Yaw Opoku	9:29
6.	"Goin' Back to New Orleans"	Hugh Masekela	5:08
7.	"Mama"	Hugh Masekela	5:10
8.	"To Get Ourselves Together"	Hugh Masekela	2:53
9.	"Witch Doctor"	Hugh Masekela	7:31
10.	"In the Jungle"	Hugh Masekela	5:13
11.	"Mamani"	Caiphus Semenya	5:26
12.	"Excuse Me Please"	Hugh Masekela	6:19
13.	"Hush (Somebody's Calling My Name)"	Joe May	3:36
Total length:			1:07:38
