= Beatin' Aroun de Bush =

Studio album by Hugh Masekela
- Released: April 4, 1992
- Studio: Max Studios, Hollywood, CA
- Genre: Jazz
- Length: 53:25
- Label: Novus Records 63136
- Producer: Hugh Masekela, Richard Druz

Hugh Masekela chronology
Uptownship (1988)	Beatin' Aroun de Bush (1992)	Hope (1993)

Professional ratings
Review scores
Source	Rating
Allmusic	4/5 stars
The Guardian	3/5 stars
The Rolling Stone Jazz & Blues Album Guide	2/5 stars

Beatin' Aroun de Bush is a 1992 studio album by South African trumpeter Hugh Masekela. It was recorded in Hollywood and released via Novus Records label.

== Reception ==
Jim Newsom of Allmusic wrote: "With a mix of smooth contemporary jazz, Afro-beat, and world music, Beatin' Aroun de Bush is a highly accessible presentation of Hugh Masekela's flügelhorn expertise, as well as a visit to his South African homeland. This album was completed as his native country was voting to abolish apartheid, and the music contained herein is at times mellow and melancholy, but mostly celebratory."

== Track listing ==
No.	Title	Writer(s)	Length
1.	"Steppin' Out"	Joe Jackson	3:34
2.	"Ngena-Ngena"	Tony Cedras	6:07
3.	"Ngena"	Bakithi Kumalo	0:52
4.	"Batsumi (Mayibuye I Afrika)"	Tony Cedras	7:36
5.	"Rock with You"	Rod Temperton	3:32
6.	"Polina"	Hugh Masekela, Dudu Pukwana	6:57
7.	"Languta"	Hugh Masekela	6:47
8.	"Sekunjalo"	Hugh Masekela	7:24
9.	"U-Mama"	Richard Druz, Hugh Masekela	4:07
10.	"Beatin' Aroun de Bush"	Richard Druz, Hugh Masekela	6:29
Total length:			53:25
