= The Chisa Years =

Album by Hugh Masekela

The Chisa Years: 1965–1975 (Rare and Unreleased)

Compilation album by Hugh Masekela
- Released: 14 March 2006
- Genre: Jazz
- Length: 1:00:36
- Label: Barely Breaking Even BBE069
- Producer: Stewart Levine, Hugh Masekela

Hugh Masekela chronology
Almost Like Being in Jazz (2005)	The Chisa Years: 1965–1975 (Rare and Unreleased) (2006)	Live at the Market Theatre (2007)

Professional ratings
Review scores
Source	Rating
AllMusic	4/5 stars

The Chisa Years: 1965–1975 (Rare and Unreleased) is a compilation album by South African jazz trumpeter Hugh Masekela. The album consists of 14 rare or forgotten tracks recorded by Stewart Levine and Hugh Masekela from 1965 to 1975 when they ran their own Chisa Records label.

== Critical reception ==
Thom Jurek of Allmusic wrote: "In sum, there isn't a weak moment on this entire collection. Its appeal is wide and deep and one can only hope this is the first of many volumes of this material to appear. BBE Records has done a stellar job in making this slab available." A reviewer of Dusty Groove added, "The Chisa sound was one of the first true forays into pan-global grooving – and it brought the sounds of Africa to the American mainstream at a level that few had managed before. Some groups were unique projects done for record – like the Johannesburg Street Band, which featured members of The Crusaders alongside Masekela – but others featured a variety of ex-patriots living in the US, with key singers and players who shine brightly under Hugh's guidance. This set really digs deep, and offers up some of the most heavily African-tuned tracks from Chisa's catalog."

Dan Nishimoto of the Prefix Magazine stated: "The compilation focuses on Masekela’s original idea of “African American Music.” From the early experiments of the Zulus (a group featuring M’Bulu) in mixing doo-wop, rhythm & blues and South African gospel and the mbaqanga/”Grazing in the Grass”-style work of the generically named Johannesburg Street Band to the clearly Fela-influenced Ojah (Masekela’s band in the mid-’70s, consisting of players from Ghana and Nigeria) and the ready-for-primetime belting of M’Bulu, each track reveals a multi-pronged effort to find and challenge the notion(s) of how African and American cultural forms could interact."

== Track listing ==
No.	Title	Length
1.	"Afro Beat Blues" (Ojah with Hugh Masekela)	6:47
2.	"Mahalela" (Letta Mbulu)	4:28
3.	"Amo Sakesa" (Baranta feat. Miatta Fahbulleh)	4:10
4.	"Joala" (The Zulus)	2:03
5.	"U Se Mcani" (Letta Mbulu)	3:34
6.	"Tepo" (Baranta with Miatta Fahnbulleh)	4:59
7.	"Za Labalaba" (The Zulus)	3:07
8.	"Witch Doctor" (Baranta with Miatta Fahnbulleh)	6:29
9.	"Melodi (Sounds of Home)" (Letta Mbulu)	4:29
10.	"Ahvuomo" (Baranta with Miatta Fahnbulleh)	6:27
11.	"Aredze" (The Zulus)	3:05
12.	"A Cheeka Laka Laka" (Baranta feat. Miatta Fahnbulleh)	4:35
13.	"Awe Mfana" (The Johannesburg Street Band)	3:14
14.	"Macongo" (Letta Mbulu)	3:15
Total length:		1:00:36
