= Stimela (album) =

Compilation album by Hugh Masekela
- Released: 1994
- Genre: Jazz, Funk, Soul
- Length: 1:01:22
- Label: Connoisseur Collection VSOP CD 200
- Producer: Hugh Masekela, Stewart Levine

Hugh Masekela chronology
Hope (1994)	Stimela (1994)	Notes of Life (1996)

Stimela is a 1994 compilation album by South African jazz trumpeter Hugh Masekela. The album was compiled and produced by Masekela's long-time colleague Stewart Levine.

== Reception ==
Professional ratings
Review scores
Source	Rating
AllMusic	4.5/5 stars
The Penguin Guide to Jazz	3/4 stars

John Storm Roberts of AllMusic noted: "These recordings are largely in Afro-funk style, though with heavy township infusions in places, from the 1960s and 1970s, including his massive hit, 'Grazin' in the Grass.' As a jazz rather than a roots mbaqanga player, Masekela was a natural for this stuff, and (some studio trickery aside) it still stands tall and powerful."

== Track listing ==
Stimela track listing
No.	Title	Writer(s)	Length
1.	"Languta"	Hugh Masekela	4:54
2.	"Child of the Earth"	Hugh Masekela	4:43
3.	"Ha Lese le Di Khanna"	Caiphus Semenya	6:44
4.	"Coincidence"	Hugh Masekela	3:34
5.	"Bajabula Bonke (The Healing Song)"	Miriam Makeba	6:33
6.	"Grazing in the Grass"	Harry Elston, Philemon Hou	2:36
7.	"If There's Anybody out There"	Hugh Masekela	3:49
8.	"Mace and Grenades"	Hugh Masekela	3:46
9.	"Felicidade"	Antônio Carlos Jobim, Vinícius de Moraes	8:39
10.	"African Secret Society"	Hugh Masekela	5:37
11.	"Been Such a Long Time Gone"	Hugh Masekela	3:55
12.	"Stimela"	Hugh Masekela	6:26
Total length:			01:01:22
