= Nomsa Manaka =

South African dancer, choreographer and actress

- Born: 1965 (age 60–61); Soweto, South Africa
- Occupations: Dancer, choreographer, actress

Nomsa Kupi Manaka (born 1965) is a South African dancer, choreographer and actress.

== Biography ==
Manaka was born in 1962 in Orlando, in the urban area of Soweto in Johannesburg, South Africa. Having been trained in classical ballet, she teaches dance at the Funda Center, which was founded by her husband, Matsemela Manaka. In 1989, she performed in a play, Gorée, set in this gathering place for slaves bound for America, and dealing with the spiritual journey of a young black woman. This woman learns of African dance, leading her to self-discovery. She travels the continent and ends up in Gorée, Senegal. There, she meets an older woman, played by Sibongile Khumalo, helping her become aware of her African heritage.

In 1991, Manaka founded a dance magazine, Rainbow of Hope, and created choreographies, including that of the opera Daughter of Nebo, in 1993. In her choreographic creations, she fuses African traditions and approaches to contemporary dance. Her husband, Matsemela Manaka, died in 1998 in a car accident.

In 2010, Manaka appeared in the Tiisetso Dladla-directed short film Exiled, about a woman coming to terms with her political exile in the United States in 1990. During the 2010s, she lived with the musician Hugh Masekela, who was suffering from prostate cancer. She herself had been diagnosed with ovarian cancer in 2016. She said about their approach to the disease: "It was important for both of us to send the message that we should celebrate our life and who we are. We should not let cancer bring us down." Hugh Masekela died in January 2018. Manaka recovered from the disease after months of chemotherapy. During her recovery, Manaka came up with the idea for the dance production Dancing Out of Cancer, staged at the Joburg Theatre to raise money for cancer patients.
