= Soweto Blues =

1977 song by Miriam Makeba

Song by Miriam Makeba

from the album You Told Your Mama Not to Worry
- Released: 1977
- Genre: Protest song
- Length: 5:24
- Label: Casablanca
- Songwriter: Hugh Masekela
- Producers: Hugh Masekela; Stanley Todd

"Soweto Blues" is a protest song written by Hugh Masekela and performed by Miriam Makeba. The song is about the Soweto uprising that occurred in 1976, following the decision by the apartheid government of South Africa to make Afrikaans a medium of instruction at school. The uprising was forcefully put down by the police, leading to the death of between 176 and 700 people. The song was released in 1977 as part of Masekela's album You Told Your Mama Not to Worry. The song became a staple at Makeba's live concerts, and is considered a notable example of music in the movement against apartheid.

== Background ==
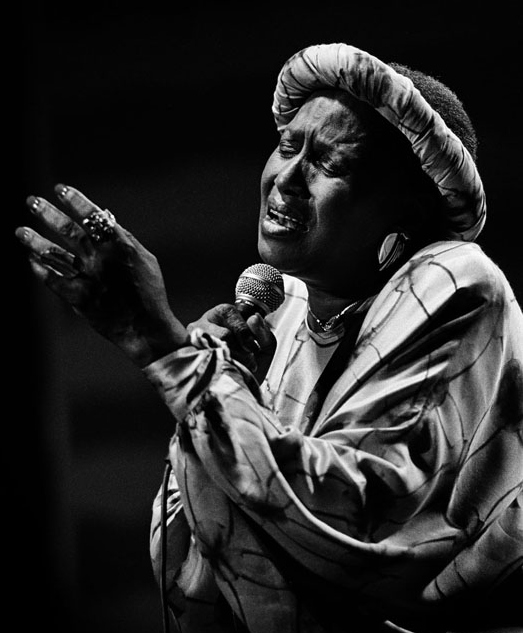
"Soweto Blues" became a staple of Miriam Makeba's live performances

In 1976, the apartheid government of South Africa decided to implement the use of Afrikaans as the medium of instruction in all schools instead of English. In response, high school students began a series of protests on the morning of 16 June that came to be known as the Soweto Uprising. Students from numerous Sowetan schools began to protest in the streets of Soweto in response to the introduction of Afrikaans as the medium of instruction in local schools. An estimated 15,000–20,000 students took part in the protests. The police were caught unawares by the protests. After initially asking the students to disperse, the police opened fire on the protesting children in order to quell the protest. The number of people who died is usually given as 176, with estimates of up to 700, while several hundred more were injured. The killings sparked off several months of rioting in the Soweto townships, and the protests became an important moment for the anti-Apartheid movement.

== Lyrics and music ==
The lyrics of "Soweto Blues" refer to the children's protests and the resulting massacre in the 1976 Soweto uprising. A review in the magazine Musician said that the song had "searingly righteous lyrics" that "cut to the bone." "Soweto Blues" was also one of many melancholic songs by Masekela that expressed his commitment to the anti-apartheid struggle, along with "Bring Him Back Home (Nelson Mandela)", "Been Gone Far Too Long", "Mama", and "The Coal Train". Musically, the song has a background of Mbaqanga guitar, bass, and multi-grooved percussion. Makeba uses this as a platform for vocals that are half-sung and half-spoken, similar to blues music.

== Release and performances ==
The song was released in 1977 as part of Masekela's album You Told Your Mama Not to Worry. It was also included in Makeba's 1989 album Welela. The song became a standard part of Makeba's live performances for many years after its release. It was also performed by Makeba on the tour for Paul Simon's 1986 album Graceland, along with many other anti-apartheid songs. Makeba was unable to perform the song in her native South Africa until after her return to the country in June 1990, only a few months after Nelson Mandela was released from prison. She was given a strong welcome back to her home country and regained her South African citizenship in 1992, the same year that she starred in the film Sarafina! about the Soweto uprising.
