= Still Grazing =

Still Grazing: The Musical Journey of Hugh Masekela
- Hardcover edition
- Author: Hugh Masekela, D. Michael Cheers
- Language: English
- Subject: Autobiography
- Genre: Non-fiction
- Publisher: Crown Archetype
- Publication date: May 11, 2004
- Publication place: United States
- Media type: Print, e-book
- Pages: 400 pages
- ISBN: 978-0609609576
- OCLC: 53231987

Still Grazing: The Musical Journey of Hugh Masekela is an autobiography book by South African trumpeter Hugh Masekela. It was released on May 11, 2004 by Crown Archetype. The book was written together with D. Michael Cheers. In this book, Masekela tells a story of his forty-year career in the world of African jazz and his travels from South Africa to New York, then to Jamaica, and then back to his homeland. The book is complemented by the album of the same name.

== See also ==
- To Be or Not to Bop: Memoirs of Dizzy Gillespie
