= Bring Him Back Home (Nelson Mandela) =

Song by Hugh Masekela

from the album Tomorrow
- Released: 1987
- Recorded: 1986
- Genre: Protest song
- Length: 4:43
- Composer: Hugh Masekela
- Lyricists: Hugh Masekela; Michael Timothy

"Bring Him Back Home (Nelson Mandela)", also known as "Bring Him Back Home", is an anthemic anti-apartheid protest song written by South African musician Hugh Masekela. It was released as the first track of his 1987 album Tomorrow. It was recorded in 1986 when Masekela was in exile from the apartheid regime of South Africa. The melody of the song is buoyant, containing a number of powerful chords and trumpet riffs. The lyrics of the song demand the release of Black South African leader Nelson Mandela, who had been imprisoned by the White South African government on Robben Island since 1962. The song became enormously popular, and turned into an unofficial anthem of the anti-apartheid movement. It became one of Masekela's most performed live songs. It was later used as a part of the official soundtrack to the documentary film Amandla!: A Revolution in Four-Part Harmony. The song was included in the 1994 live album Hope and in the 2001 collection Grazing in the Grass: The Best of Hugh Masekela, released by Columbia Records.

== Writing ==
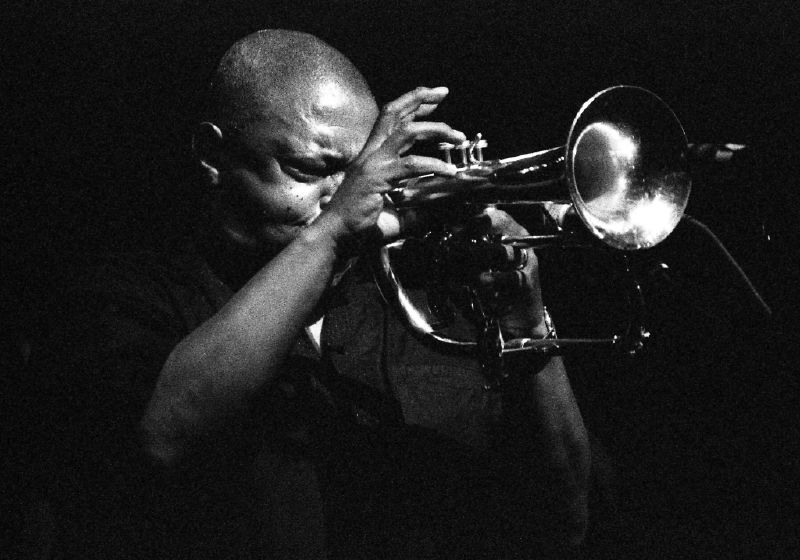
Musician Hugh Masekela, who composed the song after receiving a letter from Nelson Mandela

Black South African leader Nelson Mandela was imprisoned on Robben Island in 1962. He was a great fan of Hugh Masekela's music, and on Masekela's birthday in 1985, smuggled out a letter to him expressing his good wishes. Masekela was inspired to write "Bring Him Back Home" in response. In interviews, Masekela has expressed admiration for Mandela, saying "Mandela was the symbol. He was the voice of all [the] people." Sam Raditlhalo writes that the reception of Mandela's letter, and the writing of Bring Him Back Home, marked Masekela's evolution into an anti-apartheid activist.

== Lyrics ==
The lyrics of the song visualize Nelson Mandela "walking freely down the streets of South Africa," thus articulating a demand for his release from prison. The lyrics also mention Mandela "walking hand in hand with Winnie Mandela," then his wife. Mandela was in fact released in 1990 and went on a post-freedom tour of North America with Winnie. In Boston, he danced as this song was played after his speech.

== Music ==
The melody used in the song is upbeat and anthem-like. It employs a series of trumpet riffs by Masekela, supported by grand series of chords. Music review website AllMusic describes the music as "filled with the sense of camaraderie and celebration that are referred to in the lyrics. The vocal choir during the joyous chorus is extremely moving and life affirming".

== Reception and censorship ==
The song was banned in South Africa by the government upon its release. Nonetheless, it became a part of the number of musical voices protesting the apartheid regime, and became an important song for the anti-apartheid movement in the late 1980s. It was declared to be "clean" by the South African government following Mandela's release from prison in 1990. It became one of Masekela's most popular pieces, and one of his most performed live songs. AllMusic described it as a "truly classic modern day folk song". It was later used as a part of the official soundtrack to the documentary film Amandla!: A Revolution in Four-Part Harmony. The song was included in the 1994 live album Hope and in the 2001 collection Grazing in the Grass: The Best of Hugh Masekela, released by Columbia records. It was also covered by several other artists, and included on other collections of Masekela's music.
