= Hugh Masekela =

South African musician and composer (1939–2018)

Hugh Masekela OIS
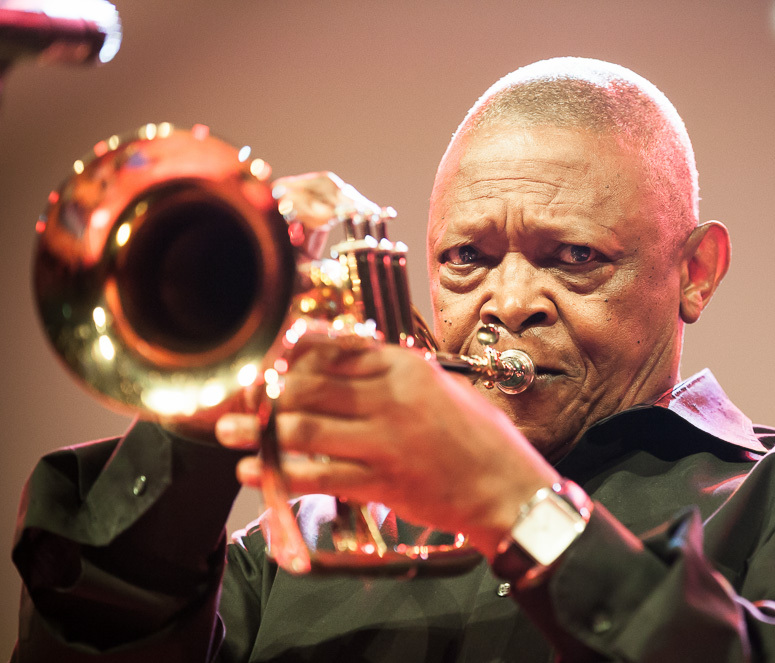
- Masekela performing in 2011
- Born: Hugh Ramapolo Masekela; 4 April 1939; Witbank, Union of South Africa
- Died: 23 January 2018 (aged 78); Johannesburg, South Africa
- Occupations: Multi-instrumentalist; singer; composer; bandleader; political activist
- Years active: 1956–2018
- Children: Selema Masekela
- Relatives: Barbara Masekela (sister)
- Musical career
- Genres: Afropop; jazz; mbaqanga
- Instruments: Trumpet; flugelhorn; trombone; cornet; vocals
- Labels: Mercury; MGM; Uni; Chisa; Blue Thumb; Casablanca; Heads Up; Verve; PolyGram
- Website: hughmasekela.co.za

Hugh Ramapolo Masekela (4 April 1939 – 23 January 2018) was a South African trumpeter, flugelhornist, cornetist, singer and composer who was described as "the father of South African jazz". Masekela was known for his jazz compositions and for writing well-known anti-apartheid songs such as "Soweto Blues" and "Bring Him Back Home". He also had a number-one US pop hit in 1968 with the song "Grazing in the Grass", which was later covered by various other artists.

== Early life ==
Hugh Ramapolo Masekela was born in Witbank (now called Emalahleni), South Africa, to Thomas Selema Masekela, who was a health inspector and sculptor; and his wife, Pauline Bowers Masekela, a social worker. His younger sister Barbara Masekela is a poet, educator and ANC activist. As a child, he began singing and playing piano and was largely raised by his grandmother, who ran an illegal bar for miners. At the age of 14, after seeing the 1950 film Young Man with a Horn (in which Kirk Douglas plays a character modelled on American jazz cornetist Bix Beiderbecke), Masekela took up playing the trumpet. His first trumpet was bought for him from a local music store by Archbishop Trevor Huddleston, the anti-apartheid chaplain at St. Peter's Secondary School now known as St. Martin's School (Rosettenville).

Huddleston asked the leader of the then Johannesburg "Native" Municipal Brass Band, Uncle Sauda, to teach Masekela the rudiments of trumpet playing. Masekela quickly mastered the instrument. Soon, some of his schoolmates also became interested in playing instruments, leading to the formation of the Huddleston Jazz Band, South Africa's first youth orchestra. When Louis Armstrong heard of this band from his friend Huddleston he sent one of his own trumpets as a gift for Masekela. By 1956, after leading other ensembles, Masekela joined Alfred Herbert's African Jazz Revue.

From 1954, Masekela played music that closely reflected his life experience. The agony, conflict, and exploitation faced by South Africa during the 1950s and 1960s inspired and influenced him to make music and also spread political change. In his music he portrayed the struggles and sorrows, as well as the joys and passions of his country. His music protested about apartheid, slavery, government; the hardships individuals were living. Masekela reached a large population that also felt oppressed due to the country's situation.

Following a Manhattan Brothers tour of South Africa in 1958, Masekela joined the orchestra of the musical King Kong, written by Todd Matshikiza. King Kong was South Africa's first blockbuster theatrical success, touring the country for a sold-out year with Miriam Makeba and the Manhattan Brothers' Nathan Mdledle in the lead. The musical later went to London's West End for two years.

== Career ==
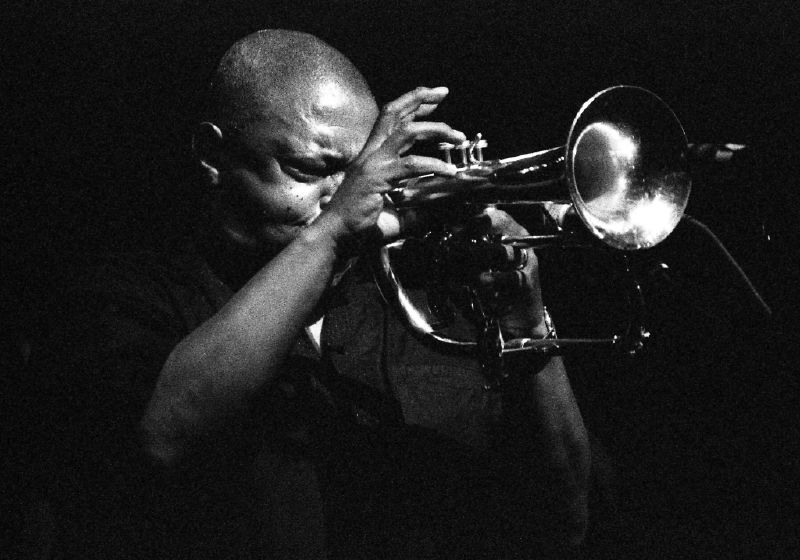
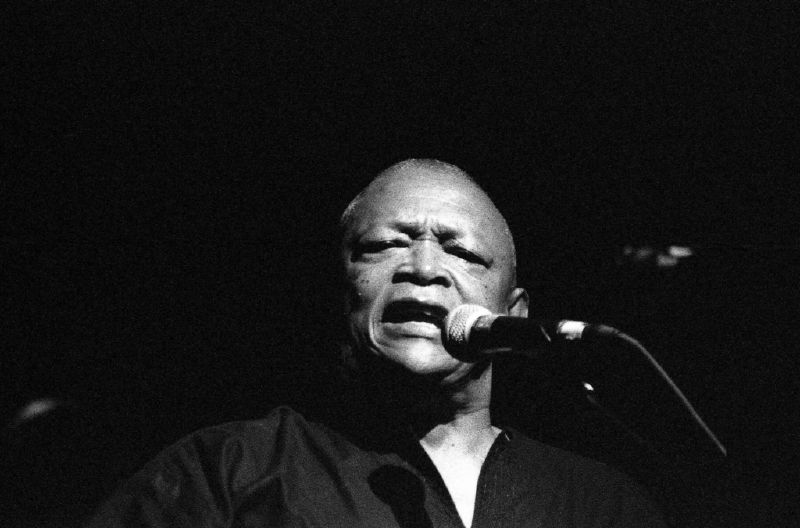
Masekela in Washington, D.C., 2007

At the end of 1959, Dollar Brand (later known as Abdullah Ibrahim), Kippie Moeketsi, Makhaya Ntshoko, Jonas Gwangwa, Johnny Gertze and Hugh formed the Jazz Epistles, the first African jazz group to record an LP. They performed to record-breaking audiences in Johannesburg and Cape Town from late 1959 to early 1960.

Following the 21 March 1960 Sharpeville massacre, during which 69 protesters were shot dead in Sharpeville, and the South African government banned gatherings of ten or more people, and the increased brutality of the Apartheid state, Masekela left the country. He was helped by Huddleston and international friends such as Yehudi Menuhin and John Dankworth, who got him admitted into London's Guildhall School of Music in 1960. During that period, Masekela visited the United States, where he was befriended by Harry Belafonte. After securing a scholarship in London, Masekela moved to the United States to attend the Manhattan School of Music in New York, where he studied classical trumpet from 1960 to 1964. In 1964, Makeba and Masekela were married, divorcing two years later.

He had hits in the US with the pop jazz tunes "Up, Up and Away" (1967) and the number-one smash "Grazing in the Grass" (1968), which sold four million copies. He also appeared at the Monterey Pop Festival in 1967, and was featured in the film Monterey Pop by D. A. Pennebaker and mentioned in the song Monterey by Eric Burdon & the Animals. In 1974, Masekela and Stewart Levine organised the Zaire 74 music festival in Kinshasa set around the Rumble in the Jungle boxing match.

He played primarily in jazz ensembles, with guest appearances on recordings by the Byrds ("So You Want to Be a Rock 'n' Roll Star" and "Lady Friend") (the latter being denied by David Crosby) and Paul Simon ("Further to Fly"). In 1984, Masekela released the album Techno Bush; from that album, a single entitled "Don't Go Lose It Baby" peaked at number two for two weeks on the dance charts. In 1987, he had a hit single with "Bring Him Back Home". The song became enormously popular, and turned into an unofficial anthem of the anti-apartheid movement and an anthem for the movement to free Nelson Mandela.

A renewed interest in his African roots led Masekela to collaborate with West and Central African musicians, and then to reconnect with Southern African players when he set up with the help of Jive Records a mobile studio in Botswana, just over the South African border, from 1980 to 1984. Here he re-absorbed and re-used mbaqanga strains, a style he continued to use following his return to South Africa in the early 1990s.

In 1985, Masekela founded the Botswana International School of Music (BISM), which held its first workshop in Gaborone that year. The event continues as the annual Botswana Music Camp, giving local musicians of all ages and from all backgrounds the opportunity to play and perform together. Masekela taught the jazz course at the first workshop, and performed at the final concert.

Also in the 1980s, Masekela toured with Paul Simon in support of Simon's album Graceland, which featured other South African artists such as Ladysmith Black Mambazo, Miriam Makeba, Ray Phiri, and other elements of the band Kalahari, which was co-founded by guitarist Banjo Mosele and which backed Masekela in the 1980s. As well as recording with Kalahari, he also collaborated in the musical development for the Broadway play Sarafina!, which premiered in 1988.

In 2003, he was featured in the documentary film Amandla!: A Revolution in Four-Part Harmony. In 2004, he released his autobiography, Still Grazing: The Musical Journey of Hugh Masekela, co-authored with journalist D. Michael Cheers, which detailed Masekela's struggles against apartheid in his homeland, as well as his personal struggles with alcoholism from the late 1970s to the 1990s. In this period, he migrated, in his personal recording career, to mbaqanga, jazz/funk, and the blending of South African sounds, through two albums he recorded with Herb Alpert, and solo recordings, Techno-Bush (recorded in his studio in Botswana), Tomorrow (featuring the anthem "Bring Him Back Home"), Uptownship (a lush-sounding ode to American R&B), Beatin' Aroun de Bush, Sixty, Time, and Revival. His song "Soweto Blues", sung by his former wife, Miriam Makeba, is a blues/jazz piece that mourns the carnage of the Soweto riots in 1976. He also provided interpretations of songs by Jorge Ben, Antônio Carlos Jobim, Caiphus Semenya, Jonas Gwangwa, Dorothy Masuka, and Fela Kuti.

In 2006 Masekela was described by Michael A. Gomez, professor of history and Middle Eastern and Islamic studies at New York University as "the father of African jazz."

In 2009, Masekela released the album Phola (meaning "to get well, to heal"), his second recording for 4 Quarters Entertainment/Times Square Records. It includes some songs he wrote in the 1980s but never completed, as well as a reinterpretation of "The Joke of Life (Brinca de Vivre)", which he recorded in the mid-1980s. From October 2007, he was a board member of the Woyome Foundation for Africa.

In 2010, Masekela was featured, with his son Selema Masekela, in a series of videos on ESPN. The series, called Umlando – Through My Father's Eyes, was aired in 10 parts during ESPN's coverage of the FIFA World Cup in South Africa. The series focused on Hugh's and Selema's travels through South Africa. Hugh brought his son to the places he grew up. It was Selema's first trip to his father's homeland.

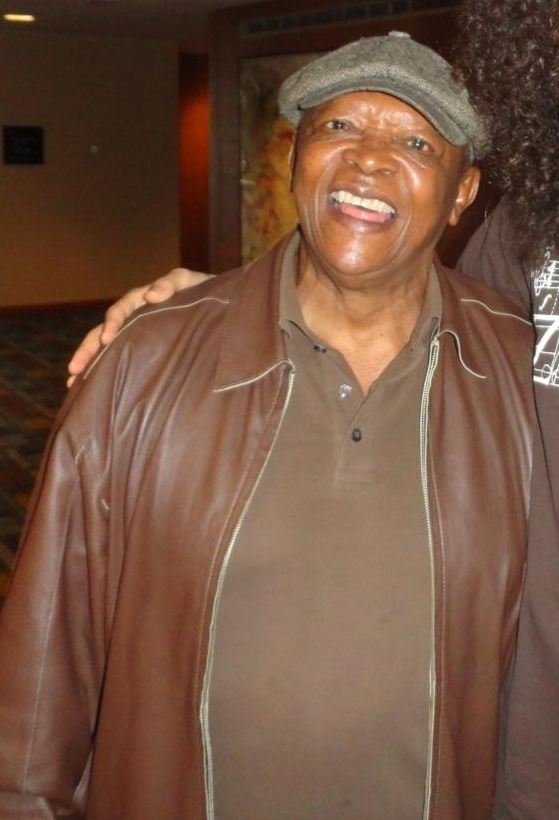
Masekela in 2013

On 3 December 2013, Masekela guested with the Dave Matthews Band in Johannesburg. He joined Rashawn Ross on trumpet for "Proudest Monkey" and "Grazing in the Grass".

In 2016, at Emperors Palace, Johannesburg, Masekela and Abdullah Ibrahim performed together for the first time in 60 years, reuniting the Jazz Epistles in commemoration of the 40th anniversary of the historic 16 June 1976 youth demonstrations.

== Social initiatives ==
Masekela was involved in several social initiatives, and served as a director on the board of the Lunchbox Fund, a non-profit organization that provides a daily meal to students of township schools in Soweto.

== Personal life and death ==
From 1964 to 1966 Masekela was married to singer and activist Miriam Makeba. He had subsequent marriages to Chris Calloway (daughter of Cab Calloway), Jabu Mbatha, and Elinam Cofie. During the last few years of his life, he lived with the dancer Nomsa Manaka. He was the father of American television host Selema Masekela. Poet, educator, and activist Barbara Masekela is his younger sister.

Masekela died in Johannesburg on the early morning of 23 January 2018 from prostate cancer, aged 78.

== Awards and honours ==
Masekela was honoured with a Google Doodle on 4 April 2019, which would have been his 80th birthday. The Doodle depicts Masekela, dressed in colourful shirt, playing a flugelhorn in front of a banner.

In 2026, a new nightclub called "Hugh's" dedicated to Masekela's memory opened in Johannesburg, set up in collaboration with the Hugh Masekela Heritage Foundation.

=== Grammy history ===
Masekela was nominated for a Grammy Award three times, including a nomination for Best World Music Album for his 2012 album Jabulani, one for Best Musical Cast Show Album for Sarafina! The Music Of Liberation (1989) and one for Best Contemporary Pop Performance for the song "Grazing in the Grass" (1968).

Hugh Masekela Grammy Awards history
Year	Category	Title	Genre	Label	Result
1968	Best Contemporary Pop Performance – Instrumental	Grazing in the Grass	Pop	Uni	Nominated
1989	Best Musical Cast Show Album	Sarafina! The Music Of Liberation	Musical	Sonet	Nominated
2012	Best World Music Album	Jabulani	World Music	Listen 2	Nominated

=== Honours ===
- 1998: Nominated for Broadway's Tony Award for Best Score (Musical), with music and lyrics collaborator Mbongeni Ngema, for Sarafina!
- 2002: BBC Radio Jazz Awards: International Award of the Year
- 2003: Order for Meritorious Service in silver
- 2005: Channel O Music Video Awards: Lifetime Achievement Award
- 2007: Ghana Music Awards:African Music Legend award
- 2010: Order of Ikhamanga in gold: South African National Orders Ceremony, 27 April 2010
- 2014: University of York: Honorary Doctorate in Music 2014
- 2015: Rhodes University: Doctor of Music (honoris causa)
- 2016: MTV Africa Music Awards (MAMAs): Legend Award

== Discography ==
=== Albums ===
Year	Title	Label (original issue)
1962	Trumpet Africaine	Mercury (Aug)
1966	Grrr	Mercury MG-21109, SR-61109 (Apr)
1966	The Americanization of Ooga Booga	MGM E/SE-4372 (Jun)
1966	Hugh Masekela's Next Album	MGM E/SE-4415 (Dec)
1966	The Emancipation of Hugh Masekela	Chisa Records CHS-4101
1967	Hugh Masekela's Latest	Uni 3010, 73010
1967	Hugh Masekela Is Alive and Well at the Whiskey	Uni 3015, 73015
1968	The Promise of a Future	Uni 73028
1968	Africa '68	Uni 73020
1968	The Lasting Impression of Hugh Masekela	MGM E/SE-4468 (Dec)
1969	Masekela	Uni 73041
1969	The Best Of Masekela	Uni 73051
1970	Reconstruction	Chisa CS 803 (Jul)
1971	Hugh Masekela & The Union of South Africa	Chisa CS 808 (May)
1972	Home Is Where the Music Is (aka The African Connection)	Blue Thumb Chisa BTS 6003
1973	Introducing Hedzoleh Soundz	Blue Thumb Chisa BTS 62
1974	I Am Not Afraid	Blue Thumb Chisa BTS 6015
1975	The Boy's Doin' It	Casablanca NBLP-7017 (Jun)
1976	Colonial Man	Casablanca NBLP-7023 (Jan)
1976	Melody Maker	Casablanca NBLP-7036
1977	You Told Your Mama Not to Worry	Casablanca NBLP-7079
1978	Herb Alpert / Hugh Masekela	Horizon SP-728
1978	Main Event Live (with Herb Alpert)	A&M SP-4727
1982	Home	Moonshine/Columbia
1983	Working For A Dollar Bill	Vuka 1001
1984	Techno-Bush	Jive Afrika
1985	Waiting for the Rain	Jive Afrika
1987	Tomorrow	Warner Bros.
1989	Uptownship	Jive/Novus Records
1992	Beatin' Aroun de Bush	Novus Records
1994	Hope	Triloka Records
1994	Stimela	Connoisseur Collection
1996	Notes of Life	Columbia/Music
1998	Black to the Future	Shanachie Records
1999	The Best of Hugh Masekela on Novus	RCA
1999	Sixty	Shanachie
2001	Grazing in the Grass: The Best of Hugh Masekela	Sony
2002	Time	Columbia
2002	Live at the BBC	Strange Fruit
2003	The Collection	Universal/Spectrum
2004	Still Grazing	Blue Thumb
2005	Revival	Heads Up
2005	Almost Like Being in Jazz	Chissa Records
2006	The Chisa Years: 1965–1975 (Rare and Unreleased)	BBE
2007	Live at the Market Theatre	Four-Quarters Ent
2009	Phola	Four-Quarters Ent
2012	Jabulani	Listen 2
2011	Friends (Hugh Masekela and Larry Willis)	House of Masekela
2012	Playing @ Work	House of Masekela
2016	No Borders	Universal Music
2020	Rejoice (Tony Allen and Hugh Masekela)	World Circuit

=== Chart singles ===
Year	Single	Chart Positions		
Year	Single	US Pop	US R&B	Can
1967	"Up-Up and Away"	71	47	-
1968	"Grazing in the Grass"	1	1	6
1968	"Puffin' On Down the Track"	71	-	43
1969	"Riot"	55	21	55
1978	"Skokiaan" with Herb Alpert	-	87	-
1984	"Don't Go Lose It Baby"	-	67	-

== Autobiography ==
- With D. Michael Cheers (2004). Still Grazing: The Musical Journey of Hugh Masekela, Crown, ISBN 978-0-609-60957-6
