= The Boy's Doin' It =

1975 studio album by Hugh Masekela

Studio album by Hugh Masekela
- Released: June 1975
- Recorded: NYC and Lagos, Nigeria
- Genre: Jazz
- Length: 40:40
- Label: Casablanca NBLP 7017
- Producer: Stewart Levine

Hugh Masekela chronology
I Am Not Afraid (1974)	The Boy's Doin' It (1975)	Colonial Man (1976)

Professional ratings
Review scores
Source	Rating
AllMusic	4.5/5 stars
The Encyclopedia of Popular Music	3/5 stars

The Boy's Doin' It is the seventeenth studio album by South African trumpeter Hugh Masekela. It was recorded in New York City and in Lagos, Nigeria, and released in June 1975 via Casablanca Records label. The album was re-released on CD in 1998 on Verve Records, with six additional tracks.

== Reception ==
John Bush of AllMusic noted: "Recorded in Lagos, Nigeria and dedicated to Fela Kuti, The Boy's Doin' It has six extended jams, each of which does an excellent job of playing off deep grooves against ensemble vocals and catchy hooks, with plenty of room for Masekela's own trumpet and every note polished to a fine '70s sheen. It didn't matter what type of music fan you were: pop, disco, funk, world music, and any but the most hidebound jazz purist could get into these tracks."

== Track listing ==
No.	Title	Writer(s)	Length
1.	"The Boy's Doin' It"	Gboyega Adelaja, Masekela, Odinga "Guy" Warren, Orlando Julius Ekemode, Papa Frankie Todd, Stanley Todd Kwesi, Yaw Opoku	5:57
2.	"Mama"	Masekela	5:11
3.	"Excuse Me Please"	Masekela	6:32
4.	"Ashiko"	Orlando Julius Ekemode	9:36
5.	"In the Jungle"	Masekela	5:14
6.	"A Person Is a Sometime Thing"	Masekela	7:46
Total length:			40:40

== Personnel ==
Band

- Hugh Masekela – horns, vocals, producer
- O.J. Ekemode – horns, vocals
- Kwasi "Rocki" Dzidzornu – congas
- Papa Frankie Todd – drums (traps)
- Yaw Opoku – electric bass, vocals
- Gboyega Adelaja – electric piano
- Stanley Todd Kwesi – guitar, vocals
- Odinga "Guy" Warren – shekere, bells, vocals
- Okyerema Asante – talking drum, vocals

Production

- Rik Pekkonen – engineer
- Doug Sax – mastering
- Stewart Levine – producer

== Notes ==
This album is dedicated to Fela Ransome-Kuti. "Special thanks" are given "to the women of the world."

The Boy's Doin It was the last of three albums of which Masekela used the backing band, the Hedzoleh Soundz.
