= 1968 in music =

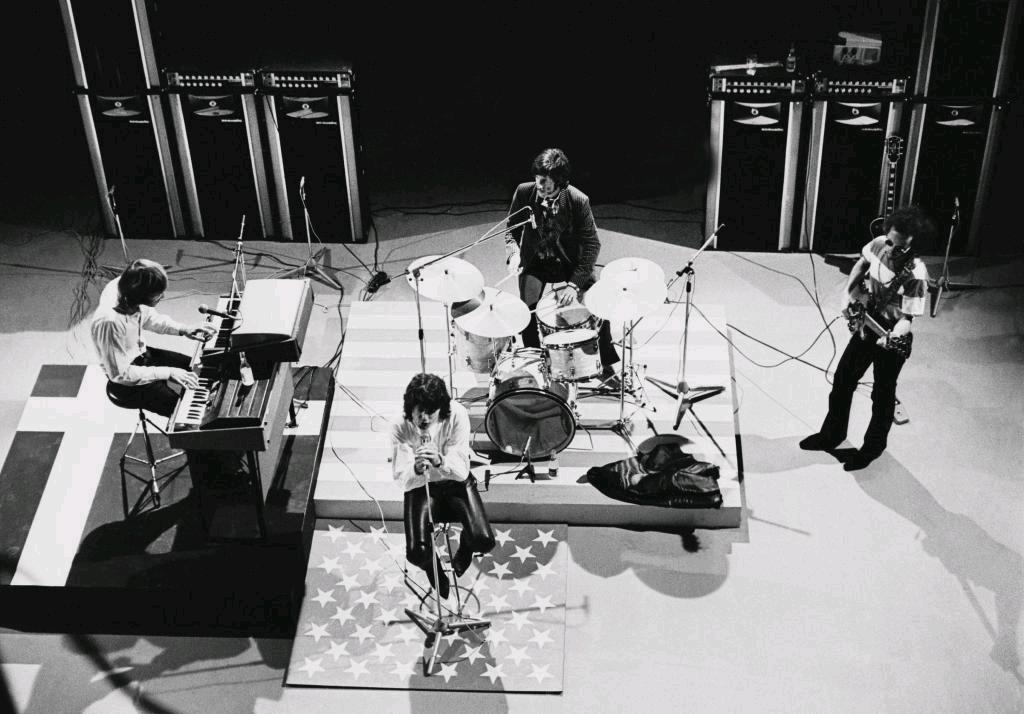
The Doors in 1968

List of notable events in music that took place in the year 1968.

== Specific locations ==
- 1968 in British music
- 1968 in Japanese music
- 1968 in Norwegian music

== Specific genres ==
- 1968 in country music
- 1968 in heavy metal music
- 1968 in jazz
- 1968 in progressive rock

== Events ==
- January 4 – Guitarist Jimi Hendrix is jailed by Stockholm police after trashing a hotel room during a drunken fist fight with bassist Noel Redding.
- January 13 – Johnny Cash records At Folsom Prison live at Folsom State Prison, California.
- January 20 – The Who and the Small Faces start a tour of Australia and New Zealand.
- January 24 – Inaugural concert of the London Sinfonietta under David Atherton at the Queen Elizabeth Hall, London, including the premiere of John Tavener's dramatic cantata The Whale.
- February 1 – Universal Studios offers The Doors $500,000 to star in a feature film, which is never made.
- February 4 – The Bee Gees make their American television debut on The Smothers Brothers Comedy Hour.
- February 12 – Jimi Hendrix is given an honorary high school diploma from Garfield High School in Seattle, Washington. He is also given the key to the city.
- February 16 – The Beatles, Mike Love, Mia Farrow, Donovan and others travel to India to visit Maharishi Mahesh Yogi at Rishikesh.
- February 18 – David Gilmour joins Pink Floyd, replacing founder Syd Barrett, who has checked himself into a psychiatric hospital.
- February 21 – McGraw-Hill, Inc., outbids eight other publishers and pays $150,000 for the U.S. rights to Hunter Davies' authorized biography of The Beatles.
- February 22 – Florence Ballard of The Supremes is released from her contract with Motown.
- February 27 – Doo-wop singer Frankie Lymon is found dead at his grandmother's house in Harlem, New York, of a heroin overdose.
- February 29 – The 10th Annual Grammy Awards are held in Chicago, Los Angeles, Nashville and New York, hosted by Stan Freberg. The Beatles' Sgt. Pepper's Lonely Hearts Club Band wins Album of the Year (the first rock LP to receive the award), while The 5th Dimension's "Up, Up and Away" wins both Record of the Year and Song of the Year. Bobbie Gentry wins Best New Artist.
- March 1 – Johnny Cash and June Carter are married in Franklin, Kentucky, with Merle Kilgore as best man.
- March 8 – Bill Graham opens the Fillmore East in an abandoned movie theater in New York City.
- March 25 – The 58th and final new episode of The Monkees airs on NBC.
- March 30 – The Yardbirds record their live album Live Yardbirds at the Anderson Theater.
- April 5 – James Brown appears on national television in an attempt to calm feelings of anger in the United States following the assassination of Martin Luther King Jr.
- April 6
  - Pink Floyd announces that Syd Barrett, who was replaced two months earlier amid deteriorating mental health, has officially left the group.
  - The 13th Eurovision Song Contest is held in the Royal Albert Hall, London. The winning song, Spain's "La, la, la" is sung by Massiel, after Spanish authorities refuse to allow Joan Manuel Serrat to perform it in Catalan. The UK finish in second place, just one point behind, with the song "Congratulations" sung by Cliff Richard, which goes on to outsell the winning Spanish entry throughout Europe.
  - The Open Pibroch Competition of the Scottish Piping Society of London is held at the London Scottish headquarters at Buckingham Gate. First place is won by Robert Brown, for the ninth time in ten years, with a performance of The King's Taxes. Second prize goes to Seamus McNeill of the College of Piping, Glasgow, with The Bells of Perth, third prize to Pipe Major Angus MacDonald of the First Battalion, Scots Guards, with Macfarlane's Gathering, and fourth prize to John MacFadyen with The Battle of Auldern. MacFadyen, however, wins narrowly over Brown in the second big competition, that for the Bratach Gorm, the blue banner of the MacCrimmons.
- April 7 – Singer/pianist/songwriter Nina Simone's performance at Westbury Music Fair is dedicated to the late Dr. Martin Luther King Jr. The song "Why? (the king of love is dead)" by Gene Taylor is performed for the first time. The show is partially released on the Emmy nominated album 'Nuff Said! (1968).
- April 29 – The rock musical Hair opens on Broadway at the Biltmore Theatre.
- May 4 – Mary Hopkin performs on the British TV show Opportunity Knocks. Hopkin catches the attention of model Twiggy, who recommends her to Paul McCartney who will soon sign Hopkin to Apple Records.
- May 5 – Buffalo Springfield perform together for the last time in Long Beach, California.
- May 7
  - Aretha Franklin records her live LP Aretha in Paris at the Olympia Theater.
  - Karlheinz Stockhausen begins composing his fifteen intuitive music works, Aus den sieben Tagen.
- May 14 – At a press conference, John Lennon and Paul McCartney introduce the Beatles' new business concept, Apple Corps, Ltd., an entertainment company that includes a recording studio, a record label and a clothing store.
- May 26 – Blues artist Little Willie John dies in prison after being convicted of manslaughter.
- May 30 – The Beatles begin recording "The White Album" (officially titled, simply, The Beatles). Sessions will span over 4 months, ending on October 14.
- June 20
  - David Ruffin is fired from The Temptations due to his ego and his inquiries into the Temptations' financial records, demanding an accounting of the group's money.
  - Martha Reeves and The Vandellas make their debut at the Copacabana in New York City, winning a rave review in The New York Times. The engagement is recorded but remains in the Motown vaults.
- July – Release in Brazil of the album Tropicália: ou Panis et Circencis by Gilberto Gil, Caetano Veloso and others, with arrangements by Rogério Duprat, inaugurates the Tropicália movement in music, which lasts in Brazil only for this year.
- July 7 – The Yardbirds perform for the last time before disbanding.
- July 9–14 – The International Eisteddfod takes place in Llangollen, North Wales
- July 18 – Mina presents her Italian white soul hits "Se stasera sono qui" and "Colpo al cuore". The performance is transmitted live without playback from the Auditorio A of the Radiotelevisione Italiana regional headquarters in Naples.
- August 1 – Jeff Beck Group release their album Truth. A seminal work of heavy metal, it incorporates blues and hard rock and introduces the talents of Rod Stewart and Ronnie Wood.
- August 4 – Yes perform for the first time, at a summer camp.
- August 5–10 – The Royal National Eisteddfod takes place in Barry, Wales.
- August 21 – Warsaw Pact invasion of Czechoslovakia. Protests are heard at this evening's performance of The Proms in London when the USSR Symphony Orchestra plays, with Mstislav Rostropovich as soloist in Dvořák's Cello Concerto.
- August 23 – Simon & Garfunkel give a live concert at the Hollywood Bowl, Hollywood, California. A recording is later released on CD in 1994 by Australian company Vigotone Records as Voices of Intelligent Dissent.
- September 7
  - Led Zeppelin perform for the first time, billed as The New Yardbirds (the Yardbirds had disbanded two months earlier, and guitarist Jimmy Page has subsequently formed this new group).
  - The Banana Splits Adventure Hour premieres on NBC.
- September 14 – Two sons of singer Roy Orbison, 10-year-old Roy DeWayne Orbison and 6-year-old Anthony King Orbison, die in a house fire in Hendersonville, Tennessee. Orbison's youngest son, Wesley, is miraculously saved by Roy's parents.
- September 15
  - Song of Summer, Ken Russell's noted TV documentary about Frederick Delius, is shown for the first time as part of the BBC's Omnibus series in the UK.
  - PocketDiscs are released in several test markets in the United States.
- September 19 – The Who begin recording Tommy, a rock opera that tells the story about a deaf, dumb and blind boy, including his experiences with life and the relationship with his family.
- October 7 – José Feliciano at Tiger Stadium for the 1968 World Series in Detroit sings a personal and controversial soul version of "The Star-Spangled Banner", the first time for the U.S. national anthem in a different style.
- October 8 – The soundtrack for the 1968 film Romeo and Juliet is released, containing the popular "What Is a Youth" theme.
- November 8 – John and Cynthia Lennon are divorced.
- November 11 – Three days after his divorce, John Lennon and Yoko Ono's experimental album Unfinished Music No. 1: Two Virgins is released in the United States. Noted for its cover photographs of the couple naked, it ends up being a flop.
- November 17 – Diana Ross & The Supremes replace The Beatles' hugely successful "Hey Jude" at number one in the U.S. with "Love Child"; this would be the last of five turnovers at number one between the two most successful music acts in America during the 1960s.
- November 22 – The Beatles (also known as "The White Album") by The Beatles is released. Also released is The Kinks Are the Village Green Preservation Society by The Kinks.
- November 26 – Cream plays their farewell concert at the Royal Albert Hall in London. It will be the last time Eric Clapton, Jack Bruce, and Ginger Baker play together until their 1993 induction into the Rock and Roll Hall of Fame.
- December 2
  - Jimi Hendrix's manager Chas Chandler quits over differences with Hendrix during the recording of Electric Ladyland
  - Janis Joplin and Big Brother and the Holding Company perform their last concert together before Janis goes solo.
- December 3 – The 50-minute television special Elvis (sponsored by sewing machine manufacturer The Singer Company), taped in June with a live audience in Burbank, California, airs on NBC in the United States marking the comeback of Elvis Presley after 7 years during which the legendary rock and roll musician's career has centered on the movie industry. Concluding with the premiere of "If I Can Dream", it is not only the highest rated television show for the week of broadcast, but the highest rated television special of the year.
- December 6 – The Rolling Stones release Beggars Banquet, which contains the classic song "Sympathy for the Devil."
- December 9
  - A political confrontation at the Planten un Blomen Hall in Hamburg results in cancellation of the scheduled premiere of Hans Werner Henze's oratorio Das Floß der Medusa, a score dedicated to Che Guevara.
  - TCB airs on NBC starring Diana Ross & the Supremes and The Temptations, becoming the first variety special in America to feature an exclusively African American cast.
  - Shinjuku Music Festival is broadcast for the first time by Nippon Cultural Broadcasting.
- December 11 – The Rolling Stones Rock and Roll Circus is filmed. Acts include The Rolling Stones, The Who, Taj Mahal, Jethro Tull, The Dirty Mac and Marianne Faithfull. This is the last appearance of Brian Jones as a member of the Rolling Stones.
- December 20 – Peter Tork announces he is leaving The Monkees.
- December 22 – The Animals reunite for one benefit concert at the Newcastle City Hall while Eric Burdon & The Animals are disbanding.
- December 31 – Small Faces break up when Steve Marriott storms off the stage.

== Bands formed ==
- Amon Düül II
- Bearsden Choir (founded)
- Black Sabbath (as Earth)
- The Brooklyn Bridge
- Can
- Colosseum
- Crosby, Stills & Nash
- Deep Purple
- Fitzwilliam Quartet
- Free
- Henry Cow
- Jacula
- King Crimson
- Led Zeppelin (as The New Yardbirds)
- Nazareth
- Rush
- UFO
- Yes

== Bands disbanded ==
- Buffalo Springfield
- Cream
- Freddie and the Dreamers
- Los Speakers
- The Righteous Brothers
- The Seekers
- The Shangri-Las
- The Yardbirds (Reformed in 1992)
- The Zombies (Reformed in 1991)

== Albums released ==
In the US, 6,540 pop singles and 4,057 albums were released.

=== January ===
| Day | Album | Artist | Notes |
|---|---|---|---|
| 2 | Elvis' Gold Records Volume 4 | Elvis Presley | Compilation |
| 2 | Sing Me Back Home | Merle Haggard | – |
| 15 | The Notorious Byrd Brothers | The Byrds | – |
| 15 | From Sea to Shining Sea | Johnny Cash | – |
| 15 | Nefertiti | Miles Davis | – |
| 16 | Vincebus Eruptum | Blue Cheer | Debut |
| 21 | Boogie with Canned Heat | Canned Heat | – |
| 21 | The Graduate | Simon & Garfunkel (incidental music by Dave Grusin) | Soundtrack |
| 22 | Gris-Gris | Dr. John | Debut |
| 22 | Heavy | Iron Butterfly | Debut |
| 22 | Lady Soul | Aretha Franklin | – |
| 22 | Spirit | Spirit | Debut |
| 29 | Steppenwolf | Steppenwolf | Debut |
| 30 | White Light/White Heat | The Velvet Underground | – |
| – | A Beacon from Mars | Kaleidoscope | – |
| – | Did She Mention My Name? | Gordon Lightfoot | – |
| – | Horizontal | The Bee Gees | – |
| – | Everybody Knows | The Dave Clark Five | US |
| – | Mass in F Minor | The Electric Prunes | – |
| – | Now and Them | Them | – |
| – | Om | John Coltrane | – |
| – | Something Else Again | Richie Havens | – |

=== February ===
| Day | Album | Artist | Notes |
|---|---|---|---|
| 19 | Once Upon a Dream | The Rascals | – |
| 21 | Child Is Father to the Man | Blood, Sweat & Tears | Debut |
| 23 | The Dock of the Bay | Otis Redding | Compilation |
| 23 | Doin' Our Thing | Booker T and The MG's | – |
| - | Fleetwood Mac | Fleetwood Mac | Debut |
| - | There Are But Four Small Faces | Small Faces | US |
| - | The Beat Goes On | Vanilla Fudge | – |
| - | Hangin' On | Waylon Jennings | – |
| - | The Inner Mystique | The Chocolate Watch Band | – |
| - | The Mason Williams Phonograph Record | Mason Williams | – |
| - | It's Been a Long Long Time | Hep Stars | – |

=== March ===
| Day | Album | Artist | Notes |
|---|---|---|---|
| 1 | The Thoughts of Emerlist Davjack | The Nice | Debut |
| 4 | We're Only in It for the Money | The Mothers of Invention | – |
| 6 | The United States of America | The United States of America | – |
| 7 | Birthday | The Association | – |
| 13 | Eli and the Thirteenth Confession | Laura Nyro | – |
| 23 | Song to a Seagull | Joni Mitchell | Debut |
| 25 | Dionne Warwick in Valley of the Dolls | Dionne Warwick | |
| 25 | Reflections | Diana Ross & The Supremes | – |
| - | The Further Adventures of Charles Westover | Del Shannon | – |
| - | The Hangman's Beautiful Daughter | The Incredible String Band | – |
| - | Harumi | Harumi | Debut |
| - | I Can't Stand Myself When You Touch Me | James Brown | – |
| - | A Long Time Comin' | Electric Flag | – |
| - | Move | The Move | Debut |
| - | A Portrait of Ray | Ray Charles | – |
| - | Safe at Home | The International Submarine Band | – |

=== April ===
| Day | Album | Artist | Notes |
|---|---|---|---|
| 3 | Bookends | Simon & Garfunkel | – |
| 3 | Wow/Grape Jam | Moby Grape | double LP |
| 5 | Scott 2 | Scott Walker | – |
| 6 | Sher-oo! | Cilla Black | – |
| 8 | The Legend of Bonnie & Clyde | Merle Haggard | – |
| 19 | Odessey and Oracle | The Zombies | – |
| 22 | The Birds, The Bees & The Monkees | The Monkees | – |
| 29 | The Temptations Wish It Would Rain | The Temptations | – |
| 29 | Linda Ronstadt, Stone Poneys and Friends, Vol. III | Stone Poneys | – |
| - | Dance to the Music | Sly & the Family Stone | – |
| - | Children of the Future | Steve Miller Band | Debut |
| - | Just Because I'm a Woman | Dolly Parton | – |
| - | God Bless Tiny Tim | Tiny Tim | Debut |
| - | I Love Charley Brown | Connie Smith | - |
| - | Randy Newman | Randy Newman | Debut |
| - | I Got the Feelin' | James Brown | – |
| - | Journey to the Center of the Mind | Amboy Dukes | – |
| - | Just Today | Bobby Vee | - |
| - | Like to Get to Know You | Spanky and Our Gang | – |
| - | Simon Says | 1910 Fruitgum Company | Debut |
| - | The Twain Shall Meet | Eric Burdon & The Animals | – |

=== May ===
| Day | Album | Artist | Notes |
|---|---|---|---|
| 6 | At Folsom Prison | Johnny Cash | Live |
| 13 | Lumpy Gravy | Frank Zappa | Reedited version |
| 14 | La La Means I Love You | The Delfonics | Debut |
| 17 | The Pentangle | Pentangle | Debut |
| 24 | Ogdens' Nut Gone Flake | Small Faces | – |
| - | Basic Blues Magoos | Blues Magoos | – |
| - | The Beat of the Brass | Herb Alpert & the Tijuana Brass | – |
| - | Heavy Sounds | Elvin Jones & Richard Davis | – |
| - | The Papas & The Mamas | The Mamas & the Papas | – |
| - | Quicksilver Messenger Service | Quicksilver Messenger Service | Debut |
| - | The Tom Jones Fever Zone | Tom Jones | Parrot album |
| - | A Tramp Shining | Richard Harris | – |
| - | Volume 3: A Child's Guide to Good and Evil | The West Coast Pop Art Experimental Band | – |

=== June ===
| Day | Album | Artist | Notes |
|---|---|---|---|
| 14 | Aretha Now | Aretha Franklin | – |
| 14 | In-A-Gadda-Da-Vida | Iron Butterfly | – |
| 14 | The Inflated Tear | Rahsaan Roland Kirk | – |
| 14 | Renaissance | Vanilla Fudge | – |
| 21 | Bare Wires | John Mayall's Bluesbreakers | – |
| 24 | Friends | The Beach Boys | – |
| 24 | Time Peace: The Rascals' Greatest Hits | The Rascals | Compilation |
| 26 | It's All About | Spooky Tooth | Debut |
| 28 | A Saucerful of Secrets | Pink Floyd | |
| - | Speedway | Elvis Presley | |
| - | 40 Blue Fingers, Freshly Packed and Ready to Serve | Chicken Shack | Debut |
| - | Baptism: A Journey Through Our Time | Joan Baez | – |
| - | Fairport Convention | Fairport Convention | Debut |
| - | Feliciano! | José Feliciano | – |
| - | The Immortal Otis Redding | Otis Redding | Compilation |
| - | Old Golden Throat | Johnny Cash | – |
| - | Os Mutantes | Os Mutantes | Debut |
| - | Ptooff! | The Deviants | Debut |
| - | Silver Apples | Silver Apples | Debut |

=== July ===
| Day | Album | Artist | Notes |
|---|---|---|---|
| 1 | Music from Big Pink | The Band | Debut |
| 3 | Waiting for the Sun | The Doors | – |
| 5 | My People Were Fair and Had Sky in Their Hair... | Tyrannosaurus Rex | Debut |
| 12 | Delilah | Tom Jones | – |
| 17 | Shades of Deep Purple | Deep Purple | US/Debut |
| 18 | Anthem of the Sun | Grateful Dead | – |
| 19 | Music in a Doll's House | Family | Debut |
| 22 | Miles in the Sky | Miles Davis | – |
| 22 | Super Session | Mike Bloomfield/Al Kooper/Stephen Stills | – |
| 22 | Yesterday I Heard the Rain | Tony Bennett | – |
| 26 | In Search of the Lost Chord | The Moody Blues | – |
| 29 | Truth | The Jeff Beck Group | Debut |
| 30 | Last Time Around | Buffalo Springfield | – |
–
| – | Aerial Ballet | Harry Nilsson | - |
| – | Begin | The Millennium | |
| – | Creedence Clearwater Revival | Creedence Clearwater Revival | Debut |
| – | Getting to the Point | Savoy Brown | – |
| – | Only the Greatest | Waylon Jennings | – |
| – | So Fine | Ike & Tina Turner | |
| – | Tape from California | Phil Ochs | – |
| – | Undead | Ten Years After | Live |
| – | Woman, Woman | Robert Goulet | – |

=== August ===
| Day | Album | Artist | Notes |
|---|---|---|---|
| 9 | Wheels of Fire | Cream | – |
| 12 | Cheap Thrills | Big Brother and the Holding Company | – |
| 19 | The Best of The Beach Boys Vol. 3 | The Beach Boys | Compilation |
| 19 | Stack-O-Tracks | The Beach Boys | Compilation |
| 23 | Mr. Wonderful | Fleetwood Mac | – |
| 26 | Diana Ross & the Supremes Sing and Perform "Funny Girl" | Diana Ross & the Supremes | performance of Funny Girl Broadway musical |
| 26 | I Heard It Through the Grapevine | Marvin Gaye | – |
| 26 | Live at London's Talk of the Town | The Supremes | Live |
| 26 | Special Occasion | The Miracles | – |
| 30 | Sweetheart of the Rodeo | The Byrds | – |
| - | Stoned Soul Picnic | The 5th Dimension | – |
| - | Behold & See | Ultimate Spinach | Debut |
| - | Every One of Us | Eric Burdon & The Animals | – |
| - | Frank Sinatra's Greatest Hits | Frank Sinatra | Compilation |
| - | James Brown Plays Nothing But Soul | James Brown | – |
| - | Live at the Apollo, Volume II | James Brown | Live |
| - | Lonely Is the Name | Sammy Davis Jr. | – |
| - | Memories | The Vogues | – |
| - | Outsideinside | Blue Cheer | – |
| - | Together | Country Joe and the Fish | – |
| - | Turn Around, Look at Me | The Vogues | – |
| - | You're All I Need | Marvin Gaye & Tammi Terrell | – |

=== September ===
| Day | Album | Artist | Notes |
|---|---|---|---|
| 9 | Just the Two of Us | Porter Wagoner and Dolly Parton | – |
| 20 | Traffic | Traffic | – |
| 27 | Picturesque Matchstickable Messages from the Status Quo | Status Quo | Debut |
| 27 | Hair | West End cast | – |
| - | Avant Slant | The John Benson Brooks Trio | |
| - | Bobby Darin Born Walden Robert Cassotto | Bobby Darin | – |
| - | Idea | Bee Gees | – |
| - | Life | Sly & the Family Stone | – |
| - | Magic Bus: The Who on Tour | The Who | Compilation |
| - | Puttin' It Together | Elvin Jones Trio | – |
| - | Shine On Brightly | Procol Harum | – |

=== October ===
| Day | Album | Artist | Notes |
|---|---|---|---|
| 1 | In Person at the Whisky a Go Go | Otis Redding | Live |
| 3 | Mama Tried | Merle Haggard | – |
| 14 | Prophets, Seers & Sages: The Angels of the Ages | Tyrannosaurus Rex | – |
| 16 | Electric Ladyland | The Jimi Hendrix Experience | – |
| 16 | Three Dog Night | Three Dog Night | Debut |
| 25 | This Was | Jethro Tull | Debut |
-
| - | Accent on Africa | Cannonball Adderley | - |
| - | Aretha in Paris | Aretha Franklin | Live |
| - | Electric Mud | Muddy Waters | – |
| - | Dream a Little Dream | Cass Elliot | Solo debut |
| - | 1, 2, 3, Red Light | 1910 Fruitgum Company | – |
| - | Bradley's Barn | The Beau Brummels | – |
| - | The Fantastic Expedition of Dillard & Clark | Dillard & Clark | Debut |
| - | The Hurdy Gurdy Man | Donovan | – |
| - | Nazz | Nazz | Debut |
| - | Sailor | Steve Miller Band | – |
| - | The Second | Steppenwolf | – |
| - | Take a Picture | Margo Guryan | Debut |
| - | The Tumbler | John Martyn | – |
| - | The Wonderful World of The Osmond Brothers | The Osmonds | – |

=== November ===
| Day | Album | Artist | Notes |
|---|---|---|---|
| 1 | Living the Blues | Canned Heat | double LP; studio + live |
| 1 | 5 By 5 (1964–69) | The Dave Clark Five | – |
| 1 | Wonderwall Music | George Harrison | Soundtrack |
| 1 | The Turtles Present the Battle of the Bands | The Turtles | – |
| 1 | Sweet Child | Pentangle | – |
| 8 | Diana Ross & the Supremes Join The Temptations | Diana Ross & the Supremes & The Temptations | Duets |
| 12 | Neil Young | Neil Young | Debut, Re-released November 1969 |
| 13 | Love Child | Diana Ross & the Supremes | – |
| 20 | Eivets Rednow | Stevie Wonder | released under pseudonym Eivets Rednow |
| 22 | The Beatles | The Beatles | commonly referred to as The White Album |
| 22 | Dusty... Definitely | Dusty Springfield | – |
| 22 | Elvis | Elvis Presley | Soundtrack to 1968 TV special |
| 22 | The Kinks Are the Village Green Preservation Society | The Kinks | – |
| 29 | Unfinished Music No. 1: Two Virgins | John Lennon and Yoko Ono | – |
| 29 | Astral Weeks | Van Morrison | – |
| - | Ars Longa Vita Brevis | The Nice | – |
| - | Head | The Monkees | Soundtrack |
| - | The Best of Cilla Black | Cilla Black | – |
| - | Back Here on Earth | Gordon Lightfoot | – |
| - | Blues from Laurel Canyon | John Mayall | – |
| - | Born to Be | Melanie Safka | Debut |
| - | The Doughnut in Granny's Greenhouse | Bonzo Dog Doo-Dah Band | – |
| - | Gentle on My Mind | Dean Martin | – |
| - | Help Yourself | Tom Jones | – |
| - | I've Gotta Be Me | Sammy Davis Jr. | – |
| - | The Ice Man Cometh | Jerry Butler | – |
| - | The Marble Index | Nico | – |
| - | Promises, Promises | Dionne Warwick | – |
| - | Release of an Oath | The Electric Prunes | – |
| - | This Is My Country | The Impressions with Curtis Mayfield | – |
| - | Time Out! Time In For Them | Them | – |
| - | Wee Tam and the Big Huge | The Incredible String Band | – |

=== December ===
| Day | Album | Artist | Notes |
|---|---|---|---|
| 2 | Cruising with Ruben & the Jets | The Mothers of Invention | – |
| 6 | Beggars Banquet | The Rolling Stones | – |
| 6 | James Taylor | James Taylor | Debut |
| 6 | For Once in My Life | Stevie Wonder | – |
| 9 | Live at the Copa | The Temptations | Live |
| 11 | Blood, Sweat & Tears | Blood, Sweat & Tears | – |
| 23 | The Natch'l Blues | Taj Mahal | – |
| - | The Book of Taliesyn | Deep Purple | US |
| - | English Rose | Fleetwood Mac | US Compilation |
| - | An American Music Band | The Electric Flag | – |
| - | Any Day Now | Joan Baez | – |
| - | Brooklyn Bridge | The Brooklyn Bridge | Debut |
| - | The Circle Game | Tom Rush | – |
| - | The Family That Plays Together | Spirit | – |
| - | I Love How You Love Me | Bobby Vinton | – |
| - | Jewels | Waylon Jennings | – |
| - | Love Is | Eric Burdon & The Animals | – |
| - | Rock and Other Four Letter Words | Marks and Lebzelter | |
| - | The Sinatra Family Wish You a Merry Christmas | Frank Sinatra | – |
| - | The Soft Machine | Soft Machine | Debut |
| - | Transformer | David Stoughton | |

=== Release date unknown ===
- 3 in the Attic – Chad & Jeremy
- 30 by Ella – Ella Fitzgerald
- A Tender Look at Love - Roger Miller
- Action! – Desmond Dekker & the Aces
- Action – Oscar Peterson
- Agemo's Trip to Mother Earth – Group 1850
- Afro-Harping – Dorothy Ashby
- All of Us – Nirvana
- Alto Summit – Lee Konitz
- The Amazing New Electronic Pop Sound of Jean Jacques Perrey – Jean-Jacques Perrey
- The Archies – The Archies
- As If It Were the Seasons – Joseph Jarman
- At It Again – The Dubliners
- Autumn – Don Ellis
- Baby, Come Back – The Equals
- Backstage – Cher
- Baiyina (The Clear Evidence) – Pat Martino
- Balaklava – Pearls Before Swine
- A Banda Tropicalista do Duprat – Rogério Duprat
- Bang, Bang You're Terry Reid – Terry Reid
- The Beat Goes On! – Sonny Criss
- Bend Me, Shape Me – The American Breed
- Bill Evans at the Montreux Jazz Festival – Bill Evans
- Bill Haley's Biggest Hits – Bill Haley & His Comets
- Black Magic – Magic Sam
- Blue Odyssey – Houston Person
- Blues – The Common Ground – Kenny Burrell
- Blues on Top of Blues – B. B. King
- Bobbie Gentry and Glen Campbell – Bobbie Gentry and Glen Campbell
- Bobby Taylor & The Vancouvers – Bobby Taylor & the Vancouvers
- The Bonniwell Music Machine – The Music Machine
- Boppin' & Burnin' – Don Patterson
- The Bottom of the Blues – Otis Spann
- Bottoms Up – Illinois Jacquet
- The Bright, the Blue and the Beautiful – Ahmad Jamal
- Bull's Eye! – Barry Harris
- Caetano Veloso – Caetano Veloso
- Calling Out Loud – Nat Adderley
- Call of the Valley – Hariprasad Chaurasia, Brij Bhushan Kabra and Shivkumar Sharma
- Caravan – Caravan
- The Cheerful Insanity of Giles, Giles and Fripp – Giles, Giles and Fripp
- The Chipmunks See Doctor Dolittle - Alvin and the Chipmunks
- Come Out Fighting Ghengis Smith – Roy Harper
- Congliptious – Roscoe Mitchell
- Count Your Blessings, Woman – Jan Howard
- Country Girl – Dottie West
- Country Hall of Fame – Hank Locklin
- The Crazy World of Arthur Brown – The Crazy World of Arthur Brown
- Cream of the Crop – Wanda Jackson
- Cry Like a Baby – The Box Tops
- Cycles – Frank Sinatra
- D-I-V-O-R-C-E – Tammy Wynette
- The Delta Sweete – Bobbie Gentry
- Devil Got My Woman – Skip James
- Dino Valente – Dino Valente
- Dion – Dion DiMucci
- Dirty Grape – Johnny "Hammond" Smith
- Disposable – The Deviants
- Down Here on the Ground – Wes Montgomery
- Drinkin' and Courtin' – The Dubliners
- Earth Opera – Earth Opera
- Easy Does It – Julie London
- The Electricfying Eddie Harris – Eddie Harris
- Elmer Gantry's Velvet Opera – Elmer Gantry's Velvet Opera
- Fall Out – Terry Smith
- Feelings – The Grass Roots
- Filles de Kilimanjaro – Miles Davis
- First Edition's 2nd – The First Edition
- For the Sake of the Song – Townes Van Zandt
- Francis A. & Edward K. – Frank Sinatra and Duke Ellington
- From St. Louie to Frisco – Chuck Berry
- Gal Costa – Gal Costa
- Gentle on My Mind – Patti Page
- Gentle On My Mind and Other Originals – John Hartford
- God Bless the Red Krayola and All Who Sail With It – Red Krayola
- Goin' to Memphis – Paul Revere & the Raiders
- Golden Grass – The Grass Roots
- Gun – Gun
- H. P. Lovecraft II – H. P. Lovecraft
- Heart of Cash – Johnny Cash
- Here Comes The Judge – Frederick Earl "Shorty" Long
- Hey Little One – Glen Campbell
- Hickory Holler Revisited – O.C. Smith
- Honey – Andy Williams
- The Horse – Cliff Nobles & Co.
- Housing Project – John Hartford
- I Can't Stop Dancing – Archie Bell & The Drells
- I Stand Alone – Al Kooper
- I'm a Fool to Want You – Sergio Franchi
- In My Own Dream – Paul Butterfield
- In New York – Ravi Shankar
- It Crawled into My Hand, Honest – The Fugs
- I Thank You – The Fugs
- It's All About – Spooky Tooth
- Karyobin – Spontaneous Music Ensemble
- Large as Life and Twice as Natural – Davey Graham
- The Left Banke Too – The Left Banke
- Live – The 13th Floor Elevators
- The Love Album – John Hartford
- Look to Your Heart – Perry Como
- Love Is All Around – The Troggs
- Love and Other Crimes – Lee Hazlewood
- Love is Blue – The Lawrence Welk Orchestra
- Lucille – B. B. King
- A Man and the Blues – Buddy Guy
- A Man Without Love – Engelbert Humperdinck
- Members, Don't Git Weary – Max Roach
- The Midnight Mover – Wilson Pickett
- Miracle Mirror – Golden Earring
- Mony Mony – Tommy James and the Shondells
- A Morning Raga / An Evening Raga – Ravi Shankar
- Nancy & Lee – Nancy Sinatra & Lee Hazlewood
- NBC-TV Special:TCB Soundtrack – Diana Ross & The Supremes with The Temptations
- The New Folk Sound of Terry Callier - Terry Callier
- 'Nuff Said! – Nina Simone
- On Stage – Bill Haley & His Comets
- One to Get Ready, Four to Go – Clare Fischer
- Otis Redding Live at the Whiskey A Go Go – Otis Redding
- Outrageous – Kim Fowley
- The Perry Como Christmas Album – Perry Como
- Power of Love – Hour Glass
- The Progressive Blues Experiment – Johnny Winter
- Promise Of A Future – Hugh Masekela
- Rare Junk – Nitty Gritty Dirt Band
- Reality Is Bad Enough – Patrick Sky
- Realization – Johnny Rivers
- Recital na Boite Barroco – Maria Bethânia
- Rhinoceros – Rhinoceros
- Ring Out Joy – Ed Summerlin
- Roots – The Everly Brothers
- S.F. Sorrow – The Pretty Things
- Scratching the Surface – The Groundhogs (debut)
- Shake! – Siegel-Schwall Band
- Sir John Alot of Merry Englandes Musyk Thynge and ye Grene Knyghte – John Renbourn
- Slow Drag – Donald Byrd
- Soul Master – Edwin Starr
- Soulful Christmas – James Brown
- The Sounds of India – Ravi Shankar
- Soul Limbo – Booker T. & the MGs
- Speak Like a Child – Herbie Hancock
- Special Occasion – Smokey Robinson & The Miracles
- Strictly Personal – Captain Beefheart and his Magic Band
- Su piano y su música – Armando Manzanero
- Switched-On Bach – Wendy Carlos
- Taj Mahal – Taj Mahal
- Le temps des fleurs – Dalida
- Tenderness Junction – The Fugs
- Texas in My Soul – Willie Nelson
- There Is – The Dells
- There Goes My Everything – Don Cherry
- Tighten Up – Archie Bell & The Drells
- Tiny Tim's 2nd Album – Tiny Tim
- Tomorrow – Tomorrow
- The Transformed Man – William Shatner
- Vigil – The Easybeats
- Wake Up...It's Tomorrow – Strawberry Alarm Clock
- Welcome to Trini Country – Trini Lopez
- Wine and Song – Sergio Franchi
- With Their New Face On – The Spencer Davis Group
- The World in a Sea Shell – Strawberry Alarm Clock

== Billboard Top popular records of 1968 ==
The 1968 Billboard year-end list is composed of records that entered the Billboard Hot 100 during November–December 1967 (only when the majority of chart weeks were in 1968), January to November–December 1968 (majority of chart weeks in 1968). Records with majority of chart weeks in 1967 or 1969 are included in the year-end charts for those years, respectively, and multiple appearances are not permitted. Each week thirty points were awarded to the number one record, then nineteen points for number two, eighteen points for number three, and so on. The total points a record earned determined its year-end rank. The complete chart life of each record is represented. There are no ties, even when multiple records have the same number of points. The next ranking category is peak chart position, then weeks at peak chart position, weeks in top ten, weeks in top forty, and finally weeks on Hot 100 chart.

The chart can be sorted by Artist, Song title, Recording and Release dates, Cashbox year-end ranking (CB) or units sold (sales) by clicking on the column header. Additional details for each record can be accessed by clicking on the song title, and referring to the Infobox in the right column of the song page. Billboard also has chart summaries on its website. Cashbox rankings were derived by same process as the Billboard rankings. Sales information was derived from the RIAA's Gold and Platinum database, the BRIT Certified database and The Book of Golden Discs, but numbers listed should be regarded as estimates. Grammy Hall of Fame and National Recording Registry information with sources can be found on Wikipedia.

| Rank | Artist | Title | Label | Recorded | Release date | CB | Sales | Charts, Awards |
|---|---|---|---|---|---|---|---|---|
| 1 | The Beatles | "Hey Jude" | Apple 2276 | July 31, 1968 | August 26, 1968 | 1 | 8.00 | US Billboard 1968 #1, Hot100 #1 for 9 weeks, 19 total weeks, 323 points, Grammy Hall of Fame 2001 |
| 2 | Marvin Gaye | "I Heard It Through the Grapevine" | Tamla 54176 | April 10, 1967 | October 30, 1968 | 3 | 4.00 | US Billboard 1968 #2, Hot100 #1 for 7 weeks, 15 total weeks, 246 points, Top Soul Singles 1968 #1, Hot Soul Singles #1 for 7 weeks, 14 total weeks, 275 points, Grammy Hall of Fame 1998 |
| 3 | Paul Mauriat and His Orchestra | "Love Is Blue (L'Amour Est Bleu)" | Philips 40495 | October 21, 1967 | December 1967 | 2 | 4.00 | US Billboard 1968 #3, Hot100 #1 for 5 weeks, 18 total weeks, 225 points, Top Easy Listening Singles 1968 #1, Easy Listening Singles #1 for 11 weeks, 24 total weeks, 187 points |
| 4 | Otis Redding | "(Sittin' On) The Dock of the Bay" | Volt 157 | November 22, 1967 | January 8, 1968 | 11 | 2.00 | US Billboard 1968 #4, Hot100 #1 for 4 weeks, 16 total weeks, 216 points, Top Soul Singles 1968 #6, Hot Soul Singles #1 for 3 weeks, 15 total weeks, 224 points, Grammy Hall of Fame 1998 |
| 5 | Bobby Goldsboro | "Honey" | United Artists 50283 | January 30, 1968 | February 17, 1968 | 6 | 3.00 | US Billboard 1968 #5, Hot100 #1 for 5 weeks, 15 total weeks, 210 points, Top Country Singles 1968 #10, Country Singles #1 for 3 weeks, 15 total weeks, 200 points |
| 6 | Herb Alpert | "This Guy's in Love with You" | A&M Records 929 | April 1968 | April 10, 1968 | 4 | 2.50 | US Billboard 1968 #6, Hot100 #1 for 4 weeks, 14 total weeks, 204 points, Top Easy Listening Singles 1968 #2, Easy Listening Singles #1 for 10 weeks, 17 total weeks, 185 points, Grammy Hall of Fame 1998 |
| 7 | The Rascals | "People Got to Be Free" | Atlantic 2537 | May 14, 1968 | July 1, 1968 | 8 | 1.50 | US Billboard 1968 #7, Hot100 #1 for 5 weeks, 14 total weeks, 201 points |
| 8 | Diana Ross and the Supremes | "Love Child" | Motown 1135 | September 1968 | September 30, 1968 | 5 | 2.00 | US Billboard 1968 #8, Hot100 #1 for 2 weeks, 16 total weeks, US R&B 1968 #24, R&B #2 for 3 weeks, 13 total weeks, 200 points |
| 9 | Simon and Garfunkel | "Mrs. Robinson" | Columbia 44511 | February 2, 1968 | April 5, 1968 | 7 | 1.50 | US Billboard 1968 #9, Hot100 #1 for 3 weeks, 13 total weeks, 173 points, Grammy Hall of Fame 1999 |
| 10 | The Union Gap featuring Gary Puckett | "Young Girl" | Columbia 44450 | January 9, 1968 | February 1968 | 9 | 1.25 | US Billboard 1968 #10, Hot100 #2 for 3 weeks, 15 total weeks, 162 points |
| 11 | Archie Bell & the Drells | "Tighten Up" | Atlantic 2478 | August 1967 | February 1968 | 14 | 1.00 | US Billboard 1968 #11, Hot100 #1 for 2 weeks, 15 total weeks, 160 points, Top Soul Singles 1968 #10, Hot Soul Singles #1 for 2 weeks, 15 total weeks, 197 points |
| 12 | Jeannie C. Riley | "Harper Valley P.T.A." | RCA Victor 20-1759 | 1968 | August 1968 | 21 | 5.50 | US Billboard 1968 #12, Hot100 #1 for 1 week, 13 total weeks, 160 points, Top Country Singles 1968 #8, Country Singles #1 for 3 weeks, 14 total weeks, 208 points, Grammy Hall of Fame in 2019 |
| 13 | John Fred and His Playboy Band | "Judy in Disguise (With Glasses)" | Paula 282 | September 1967 | October 1967 | 12 | 1.00 | US Billboard 1968 #13, Hot100 #1 for 2 weeks, 16 total weeks, 159 points |
| 14 | The Doors | "Hello, I Love You" | Elektra 45635 | February to May 1968 | June 11, 1968 | 16 | 1.50 | US Billboard 1968 #14, Hot100 #1 for 2 weeks, 12 total weeks, 156 points |
| 15 | The Union Gap featuring Gary Puckett | "Woman, Woman" | Columbia 37095 | August 16, 1967 | September 19, 1967 | 17 | 1.00 | US Billboard 1968 #15, Hot100 #4 for 3 weeks, 17 total weeks, 150 points |
| 16 | Glen Campbell | "Wichita Lineman" | Capitol 2302 | August 4, 1968 | October 1968 | 19 | 3.00 | US Billboard 1968 #16, Hot100 #3 for 1 weeks, 15 total weeks, 149 points, Top Country Singles 1968 #11, Country Singles #1 for 2 weeks, 19 total weeks, 194 points, Top Easy Listening Singles 1968 #3, Easy Listening Singles #1 for 6 weeks, 18 total weeks, 172 points, Grammy Hall of Fame 2019, National Recording Registry 2019 |
| 17 | Stevie Wonder | "For Once in My Life" | Tamla 54174 | April 10, 1968 | October 1968 | 27 | 1.00 | US Billboard 1968 #17, Hot100 #2 for 2 weeks, 14 total weeks, 148 points, Grammy Hall of Fame 2009 |
| 18 | Hugo Montenegro, His Orchestra And Chorus | "The Good, the Bad and the Ugly" | RCA Victor 47-9423 | November 22, 1967 | January 1968 | 25 | 2.00 | US Billboard 1968 #18, Hot100 #2 for 1 weeks, 22 total weeks, 148 points, Top Easy Listening Singles 1968 #4, Easy Listening Singles #1 for 3 weeks, 26 total weeks, 167 points |
| 19 | Mary Hopkin | "Those Were The Days" | Apple 8526 | July 1968 | August 26, 1968 | 10 | 8.00 | US Billboard 1968 #19, Hot100 #2 for 3 weeks, 13 total weeks, 146 points, Top Easy Listening Singles 1968 #6, Easy Listening Singles #1 for 6 weeks, 13 total weeks, 167 points |
| 20 | The Lemon Pipers | "Green Tambourine" | Buddah 23 | August 1967 | November 1967 | 13 | 2.00 | US Billboard 1968 #20, Hot100 #1 for 1 week, 13 total weeks, 139 points |
| 21 | Dionne Warwick | "(Theme from) Valley of the Dolls" | Scepter 12203 | 1967 | October 1967 | 49 | 1.00 | US Billboard 1968 #21, Hot100 #2 for 4 weeks, 13 total weeks, 139 points, Grammy Hall of Fame 1998 |
| 22 | O. C. Smith | "Little Green Apples" | Columbia 44616 | August 1968 | September 1968 | 35 | 1.00 | US Billboard 1968 #22, Hot100 #2 for 1 weeks, 17 total weeks, 137 points |
| 23 | Hugh Masekela | "Grazing in the Grass" | Uni 55066 | March 12, 1968 | May 1968 | 47 | 1.00 | US Billboard 1968 #23, Hot100 #1 for 2 weeks, 12 total weeks, 134 points, Top Soul Singles 1968 #7, Hot Soul Singles #1 for 4 weeks, 14 total weeks, 215 points, Grammy Hall of Fame 2018 |
| 24 | The Rolling Stones | "Jumpin' Jack Flash" | London 908 | April 20, 1968 | June 1, 1968 | 15 | 1.00 | US Billboard 1968 #24, Hot100 #3 for 3 weeks, 12 total weeks, 131 points |
| 25 | Gary Puckett and the Union Gap | "Lady Willpower" | Columbia 44547 | April 9, 1968 | June 1, 1968 | 20 | 1.00 | US Billboard 1968 #25, Hot100 #2 for 2 weeks, 13 total weeks, 130 points |
| 26 | Steppenwolf | "Born To Be Wild" | Dunhill 4138 | April 10, 1967 | October 1968 | 26 | 1.00 | US Billboard 1968 #26, Hot100 #2 for 3 week, 13 total weeks, 129 points, Grammy Hall of Fame 2002 |
| 27 | The Rascals | "A Beautiful Morning" | Atlantic 2493 | March 6, 1968 | March 22, 1968 | 18 | 1.50 | US Billboard 1968 #27, Hot100 #3 for 2 weeks, 13 total weeks, 128 points |
| 28 | Classics IV | "Spooky" | Imperial 66259 | August 1967 | December 1967 | 40 | 1.00 | US Billboard 1968 #28, Hot100 #3 for 3 weeks, 15 total weeks, 127 points |
| 29 | The Crazy World of Arthur Brown | "Fire" | Atlantic 2556 | September 1, 1968 | September 7, 1968 | 33 | 1.00 | US Billboard 1968 #29, Hot100 #2 for 1 weeks, 13 total weeks, 126 points |
| 30 | The Box Tops | "Cry Like a Baby" | Mala 593 | August 1967 | February 1968 | 34 | 1.00 | US Billboard 1968 #30, Hot100 #2 for 2 weeks, 15 total weeks, 125 points |
| 31 | Aretha Franklin | "Chain Of Fools" | Atlantic 2464 | August 1967 | November 1967 | 29 | 1.00 | US Billboard 1968 #31, Hot100 #2 for 2 weeks, 12 total weeks, 124 points, Top Soul Singles 1968 #4, Hot Soul Singles #1 for 4 weeks, 14 total weeks, 238 points |
| 32 | Richard Harris | "MacArthur Park" | Dunhill 4134 | December 21, 1967 | April 1968 | 31 | 2.00 | US Billboard 1968 #32, Hot100 #2 for 1 weeks, 13 total weeks, 122 points |
| 33 | The Beatles | "Lady Madonna" | Capitol 2138 | February 6, 1968 | March 18, 1968 | 30 | 1.00 | US Billboard 1968 #33, Hot100 #4 for 3 week, 11 total weeks, 121 points |
| 34 | Mason Williams | "Classical Gas" | Warner Bros./Seven Arts 7190 | August 1967 | February 1968 | 22 | 1.00 | US Billboard 1968 #34, Hot100 #2 for 2 weeks, 14 total weeks, 120 points, Top Easy Listening Singles 1968 #7, Easy Listening Singles #1 for 3 weeks, 17 total weeks, 161 points |
| 35 | Dion | "Abraham, Martin and John" | Laurie 3464 | 1968 | August 1968 | 32 | 1.00 | US Billboard 1968 #35, Hot100 #4 for 2 weeks, 14 total weeks, 120 points |
| 37 | Steppenwolf | "Magic Carpet Ride" | Dunhill 4161 | March 1, 1968 | September 1968 | 48 | 1.00 | US Billboard 1968 #37, Hot100 #3 for 1 week, 16 total weeks, 119 points |
| 149 | Tiny Tim | "Tiptoe Thru’ the Tulips with Me" | Reprise 0679 | December 21, 1967 | April 1968 | 170 | 1.00 | US Billboard 1968 #149, Hot100 #17 for 1 weeks, 9 total weeks, 4 points |

   Billboard Top Soul Singles 1968

| 1 | Marvin Gaye | "I Heard It Through the Grapevine" | | | | | | see number 2 |
| 2 | Johnnie Taylor | "Who's Making Love" | Stax 0009 | August 1968 | October 1968 | 52 | 1.00 | US Billboard 1968 #43, Hot100 #5 for 2 weeks, 14 total weeks, 113 points, Top Soul Singles 1968 #2, Hot Soul Singles #1 for 3 weeks, 16 total weeks, 258 points |
| 3 | James Brown & His Famous Flames | "Say It Loud – I'm Black and I'm Proud" | King 6187 | August 7, 1968 | August 1968 | 160 | 1.00 | US Billboard 1968 #84, Hot100 #10 for 1 week, 11 total weeks, 59 points, Top Soul Singles 1968 #3, Hot Soul Singles #1 for 6 weeks, 12 total weeks, 240 points |
| 4 | Aretha Franklin | "Chain Of Fools" | | | | | | see number 31 |
| 5 | Marvin Gaye and Tammi Terrell | "You're All I Need To Get By" | Tamla 54169 | April 10, 1967 | July 9, 1968 | 44 | 2.00 | US Billboard 1968 #75, Hot100 #7 for 1 week, 12 total weeks, 67 points, Top Soul Singles 1968 #5, Hot Soul Singles #1 for 5 weeks, 13 total weeks, 227 points |

   Billboard Top Country Singles 1968

| 1 | Henson Cargill | "Skip a Rope" | Monument 1041 | September 1967 | November 1967 | 187 | 1.00 | US Billboard 1968 #188, Hot100 #25 for 2 weeks, 12 total weeks, Top Country Singles 1968 #1, Country Singles #1 for 5 weeks, 19 total weeks, 261 points |
| 2 | Tammy Wynette | "Stand By Your Man" | Epic 10398 | August 28, 1968 | September 20, 1968 | 179 | 1.00 | US Billboard 1968 #155, Hot100 #19 for 1 week, 16 total weeks, 4 points, Top Country Singles 1968 #2, Country Singles #1 for 5 weeks, 19 total weeks, 244 points, Grammy Hall of Fame 1999, National Recording Registry 2010 |
| 3 | Tammy Wynette | "D-I-V-O-R-C-E" | Epic 10315 | March 22, 1968 | May 1, 1968 | 179 | 1.00 | US Billboard 1968 #427, Hot100 #63 for 1 week, 6 total weeks, Top Country Singles 1968 #3, Country Singles #1 for 3 weeks, 17 total weeks, 241 points |
| 4 | Johnny Cash | "Folsom Prison Blues" | Columbia 44513 | January 13, 1968 | April 30, 1968 | 187 | 1.00 | US Billboard 1968 #230, Hot100 #32 for 3 weeks, 12 total weeks, Top Country Singles 1968 #4, Country Singles #1 for 4 weeks, 18 total weeks, 240 points, National Recording Registry 2003 |

   Billboard Top Easy Listening Singles 1968

| 1 | Paul Mauriat and His Orchestra | "Love Is Blue (L'Amour Est Bleu)" | | | | | | see number 3 |
| 2 | Herb Alpert | "This Guy's in Love with You" | | | | | | see number 6 |
| 3 | Glen Campbell | "Wichita Lineman" | | | | | | see number 16 |
| 4 | Hugo Montenegro, His Orchestra And Chorus | "The Good, the Bad and the Ugly" | | | | | | see number 18 |
| 5 | Sergio Mendes & Brasil '66 | "The Fool On The Hill" | A&M 961 | June 1968 | July 1968 | 84 | 1.00 | US Billboard 1968 #91, Hot100 #6 for 1 week, 12 total weeks, 53 points, Top Easy Listening Singles 1968 #5, Easy Listening Singles #1 for 6 weeks, 15 total weeks, 294 points |

   Top Rock Tracks 1968 (unofficial)

| 1 | Cream | "Sunshine of Your Love" | Atco 6544 | May 30, 1967 | November 2, 1967 | 44 | 2.00 | US Billboard 1968 #38, Hot100 #5 for 1 week, 26 total weeks, 119 points, Top Rock Tracks 1968 #1, from Disraeli Gears - Atco 232 |
| 2 | The Jimi Hendrix Experience | "All Along the Watchtower" | Reprise 0767 | January 21, 1968 | September 2, 1968 | 169 | 2.00 | US Billboard 1968 #163, Hot100 #20 for 2 weeks, 9 total weeks, 4 points, Top Rock Tracks 1968 #2, from Electric Ladyland - Reprise 6307, Grammy Hall of Fame 2001 |
| 3 | The Rolling Stones | "Sympathy For The Devil" | London 33 | July 25, 1968 | December 6, 1968 | | 1.00 | Top Rock Tracks 1968 #3, from Beggars Banquet - London 33 |
| 4 | The Beatles | "While My Guitar Gently Weeps" | Apple 101 | September 5–6, 1968 | November 22, 1968 | | 1.00 | Top Rock Tracks 1968 #4, from The Beatles (White Album) - Apple 101 |
| 5 | The Band | "The Weight" | Capitol 2269 | January 1968 | August 8, 1968 | 422 | 1.00 | US Billboard 1968 #424, Hot100 #63 for 1 week, 7 total weeks, Top Rock Tracks 1968 #5, from Music From Big Pink - Capitol 2955 |
| 6 | The Doors | "Love Me Two Times" | Elektra 45624 | April 1967 | November 1967 | 221 | 1.00 | US Billboard 1968 #194, Hot100 #25 for 1 week, 7 total weeks, Top Rock Tracks 1968 #6, from Strange Days - Elektra 74014. |
| 7 | Cream | "White Room" | Atco 6617 | June 1967-April 1968 | September 1968 | 46 | 2.00 | US Billboard 1968 #54, Hot100 #6 for 3 weeks, 11 total weeks, 96 points, Top Rock Tracks 1968 #7, from Wheels of Fire - Atco 700 |
| 8 | The Rolling Stones | "Stray Cat Blues" | London 33 | July 25, 1968 | December 6, 1968 | | | Top Rock Tracks 1968 #8, from Beggars Banquet - London 33 |
| 9 | Status Quo | "Pictures Of Matchstick Men" | Cadet Concept 7001 | November 1967 | January 5, 1968 | 116 | 1.00 | US Billboard 1968 #113, Hot100 #12 for 1 week, 17 total weeks, 28 points, Top Rock Tracks 1968 #9, from Picturesque Matchstickable Messages from the Status Quo - Cadet Concept single 7001 |
| 10 | Big Brother and the Holding Company | "Piece Of My Heart" | Columbia 44626 | March 2-May 20, 1968 | August 12, 1968 | 132 | 1.00 | US Billboard 1968 #111, Hot100 #12 for 1 week, 12 total weeks, 33 points, Top Rock Tracks 1968 #10, from Cheap Thrills - Columbia 9700 |

== Other hit singles ==
- "2 in 3" – Esther & Abi Ofarim
- "Ain't Got No, I Got Life"/"Do What You Gotta Do" – Nina Simone
- "Ain't No Way" – Aretha Franklin
- "Ain't Nothin' but a Houseparty" – The Showstoppers
- "Ain't Nothing Like the Real Thing" – Marvin Gaye & Tammi Terrell
- "Albatross" – Fleetwood Mac
- "Am I That Easy to Forget" – Engelbert Humperdinck
- "Anything" – Eric Burdon & The Animals
- "Baby Come Back" – The Equals
- "The Ballad of Bonnie and Clyde" – Georgie Fame
- "Bend Me, Shape Me" – The American Breed
- "Bend Me, Shape Me" – Amen Corner
- "Blue Eyes" – Don Partridge
- "Both Sides Now" – Judy Collins
- "Breakin' Down the Walls of Heartache" – The Bandwagon
- "Cab Driver" – The Mills Brothers
- "California Dreamin'" – Bobby Womack
- "Can't Take My Eyes Off You" – Andy Williams
- "Captain of Your Ship" – Reparata and the Delrons
- "Cloud Nine" – The Temptations
- "Congratulations" – Cliff Richard
- "Dance to the Music" – Sly & the Family Stone
- "Darlin'" – The Beach Boys
- "A Day Without Love" – Love Affair
- "Days" – The Kinks
- "Delilah" – Tom Jones
- "Do It Again" – The Beach Boys
- "Do You Know the Way to San Jose" – Dionne Warwick
- "Du sollst nicht weinen" – Heintje
- "Eloise" – Barry Ryan
- "Everlasting Love" – Love Affair
- "Everything I Am" – Plastic Penny
- "Feliciano!" – Jose Feliciano
- "Fire!" – The Crazy World of Arthur Brown
- "Fire Brigade" – The Move
- "Fool on the Hill" – Sergio Mendes & Brasil '66
- "Girl Watcher" – The O'Kaysions
- "Going Up the Country" – Canned Heat
- "Gimme Little Sign" – Brenton Wood
- "Help Yourself" – Tom Jones
- "Helule Helule" – The Tremeloes
- "High in the Sky – Amen Corner
- "Hold Me Tight" – Johnny Nash
- "The House That Jack Built" – Aretha Franklin
- "Hurdy Gurdy Man" – Donovan
- "Hush" – Deep Purple
- "The Horse" – Cliff Nobles & Co.
- "I Can Take or Leave Your Loving" – Herman's Hermits
- "I Close My Eyes and Count to Ten" – Dusty Springfield
- "I Don't Want Our Loving to Die" – The Herd
- "I Love You" – People!
- "Il est cinq heures, Paris s'éveille" – Jacques Dutronc
- "I Pretend" – Des O'Connor
- "I Thank You" – Sam & Dave
- "I Wish It Would Rain" – The Temptations
- "I'll Love You Forever Today" – Cliff Richard
- "I'm a Tiger" – Lulu
- "I'm the Urban Spaceman" – Bonzo Dog Doo-Dah Band
- "I've Gotta Be Me" – Sammy Davis Jr.
- "I've Gotta Get a Message to You" – Bee Gees
- "Ice in the Sun" – Status Quo
- "If I Only Had Time" – John Rowles
- "In-A-Gadda-Da-Vida" – Iron Butterfly
- "Indian Rope Man" – Julie Driscoll, Brian Auger & The Trinity
- "Jennifer Juniper" – Donovan
- "Jesamine" – The Casuals
- "Journey to the Center of the Mind" – The Amboy Dukes
- "Just Dropped In (To See What Condition My Condition Was In)" – The First Edition
- "Keep On" – Bruce Channel
- "Keep the Ball Rollin'" – Al Hirt
- "Lazy Sunday" – Small Faces
- "The Legend of Xanadu" – Dave Dee, Dozy, Beaky, Mick & Tich
- "Light My Fire" – Jose Feliciano
- "Little Arrows" – Leapy Lee
- "Little Green Apples" – Roger Miller
- "The Look of Love" – Sergio Mendes & Brasil '66
- "Lovin' Things" – Marmalade
- "Magic Bus" – The Who
- "A Man Without Love" – Engelbert Humperdinck
- "Marianne" – Cliff Richard
- "Master Jack" – Four Jacks and a Jill
- "Mathilda" – Udo Jürgens
- "Me the Peaceful Heart" – Lulu
- "Midnight Confessions" – The Grass Roots
- "Mighty Quinn" – Manfred Mann
- "Monterey" – Eric Burdon & The Animals
- "Mony Mony" – Tommy James & the Shondells
- "Mountain of Love" - Ronnie Dove
- "My Little Lady" – The Tremeloes
- "My Name is Jack" – Manfred Mann
- "My Song" – Aretha Franklin
- "Need Your Love So Bad" – Fleetwood Mac
- "Ob-La-Di, Ob-La-Da" – The Marmalade
- "On the Road Again" – Canned Heat
- "Only One Woman" – The Marbles
- "Over You" – Gary Puckett & The Union Gap
- "Paradise Lost" – The Herd
- "Playboy" – Gene & Debbe
- "Race with the Devil" – The Gun
- "Rainbow Valley" – Love Affair
- "Reach out of the Darkness" – Friend & Lover
- "Rosie" – Don Partridge
- "Scarborough Fair" – Sergio Mendes & Brasil '66
- "Schlager Rendezvous 1" – Peter Alexander
- "See Saw" – Aretha Franklin
- "The Silent Sun" – Genesis
- "Simon Says" – 1910 Fruitgum Company
- "Sky Pilot" – Eric Burdon & The Animals
- "Sleepy Joe" – Herman's Hermits
- "Slip Away" – Clarence Carter
- "Some Velvet Morning" – Lee Hazlewood & Nancy Sinatra
- "Son of a Preacher Man" – Dusty Springfield
- "Son of Hickory Holler's Tramp" – O. C. Smith
- "Soulful Strut" – Young-Holt Unlimited
- "Step Inside Love" – Cilla Black
- "Stoned Soul Picnic" – The 5th Dimension
- "Suddenly You Love Me" – The Tremeloes
- "Summertime" – Big Brother & The Holding Company
- "Sunshine Girl" – Herman's Hermits
- "Suzie Q." – Creedence Clearwater Revival
- "Sweet Blindness" – The 5th Dimension
- "(Sweet Sweet Baby) Since You've Been Gone" – Aretha Franklin
- "Take Time to Know Her" – Percy Sledge
- "This Wheel's on Fire" – Julie Driscoll, Brian Auger & The Trinity
- "Valleri" – The Monkees
- "What a Wonderful World" – Louis Armstrong, His Orchestra & Chorus
- "White Horses" – Jacky
- "White Houses" – Eric Burdon & The Animals
- "A Winter's Tale" – Genesis
- "With a Little Help from My Friends" – Joe Cocker
- "Yesterday Has Gone" – Cupid's Inspiration
- "You Ain't Goin' Nowhere" – The Byrds
- "Yummy Yummy Yummy" – The Ohio Express

== Published popular music ==
- "1,2,3, Red Light" w.m. Sal Trimachi and Bobbi Trimachi
- "1432 Franklin Pike Circle Hero" w.m. Bobby Russell
- "Abraham, Martin and John" w.m. Dick Holler
- "Les Bicyclettes de Belsize" w.m. Les Reed & Barry Mason
- "Chitty Chitty Bang Bang" w.m. Richard M. Sherman & Robert B. Sherman from the film of the same name
- "Classical Gas" m. Mason Williams
- "Congratulations" w.m. Bill Martin and Phil Coulter
- "Dear World" w.m. Jerry Herman from the musical Dear World
- "Eli's Comin'" w.m. Laura Nyro
- "The Fool on the Hill" w.m. John Lennon & Paul McCartney
- "For the Good Times" w.m. Kris Kristofferson
- "Galveston" w.m. Jimmy Webb
- "Heffalumps and Woozles" w.m. Richard M. Sherman & Robert B. Sherman from the film Winnie the Pooh and the Blustery Day
- "Honey Pie" w.m. John Lennon and Paul McCartney
- "I'll Never Fall in Love Again" w. Hal David m. Burt Bacharach from the musical Promises, Promises
- "Indian Lake" w.m. Tony Romeo
- "Indian Reservation" w.m. John D. Loudermilk, first recorded by Don Fardon
- "Little Green Apples" w.m. Bobby Russell
- "Mac Arthur Park" w.m. Jimmy Webb
- "Mr. Bojangles" w.m. Jerry Jeff Walker
- "My Way" (French: "Comme d'habitude") w.m. Claude François & Jacques Revaux, Eng.: Paul Anka
- "The Night They Raided Minsky's" w. Lee Adams m. Charles Strouse from the film The Night They Raided Minsky's
- "A Perfect Gentleman" w. Lee Adams m. Charles Strouse Introduced by Jason Robards and Norman Wisdom in the film The Night They Raided Minsky's
- "Promises, Promises" w. Hal David m. Burt Bacharach from the musical Promises, Promises
- "Save The Country" w.m. Laura Nyro
- "Stand By Your Man" w.m. Billy Sherrill & Tammy Wynette
- "Stoned Soul Picnic" w.m. Laura Nyro
- "Sweet Blindness" w.m. Laura Nyro
- "Take Ten Terrific Girls" w. Lee Adams m. Charles Strouse from the film The Night They Raided Minsky's
- "Ten Feet off the Ground" w.m. Richard M. Sherman & Robert B. Sherman from the film The One and Only, Genuine, Original Family Band
- "This Guy's In Love With You" w. Hal David m. Burt Bacharach
- "Wichita Lineman" w.m. Jimmy Webb
- "The Windmills of Your Mind" w. Alan Bergman & Marilyn Bergman m. Michel LeGrand from the film The Thomas Crown Affair
- "The Wonderful Thing About Tiggers" w.m. Richard M. Sherman & Robert B. Sherman from the film Winnie the Pooh and the Blustery Day
- "You Rat, You" w. Lee Adams m. Charles Strouse from the film The Night They Raided Minsky's

== Classical music ==
=== Premieres ===
| Composer | Composition | Date | Location | Performers |
|---|---|---|---|---|
| Barraqué, Jean | Le Temps restitué (1956–68) | 1968-04-04 | Royan Festival, France | Pilarczyk – French Radio Choir – Ensemble du Domaine Musical, Amy |
| Barraqué, Jean | Concerto (1968) | 1968-11-20 | Royal Festival Hall, London | Rostaing / Fry / BBC Symphony Orchestra – Amy |
| Langgaard, Rued | Violin Concerto (1944) | 1968-01-10 | Odense, Denmark | Laursen / Odense Municipal Orchestra – Wellejus |
| Stockhausen, Karlheinz | Kurzwellen for six players with shortwave receivers and live electronics | 1968-05-05 | Bremen, Germany, Radio Bremen TV Studio, Pro Musica Nova | Aloys Kontarsky, Alings, Gehlhaar, Fritsch, Bojé, Stockhausen |
| Villa-Lobos, Heitor | Fantaisie concertante for piano, clarinet and bassoon | 1968-11-19 | Rio de Janeiro, Sale Cecilia Meireles | Botelho, Devos, Improta |

=== Compositions ===
- Milton Babbitt – Relata II for orchestra
- Henk Badings
  - Symphony No. 14
  - Armageddon
- Samuel Barber – Twelfth Night and To Be Sung on the Water, op. 42
- Jean Barraqué –
  - Concerto, for six instrumental formations and two solo instruments (vibraphone and clarinet)
  - Le Temps restitué for mezzo-soprano, choir, and orchestra
- Luciano Berio –
  - O King
  - Sinfonia
  - Chemins III
  - Questo vuol dire che for three female voices, small chorus, tape and other available resources
- Pierre Boulez - Domaines
  - Livre pour cordes
- Carlos Chávez – Pirámide (ballet)
- John Corigliano – Piano Concerto
- George Crumb – Songs, Drones, and Refrains of Death for baritone, electric guitar, electric double bass, amplified piano/electric harpsichord, and two percussionists
- Mario Davidovsky – Music for Solo Violin
- Havergal Brian
  - Symphony No. 31
  - Symphony No. 32 in A flat major
  - Legend "Ave atque vale"
- Peter Maxwell Davies –
  - Stedman Caters
  - Stedman Doubles (revised version)
  - Fantasia on a Ground and 2 Pavans (after Purcell)
  - Epistrophe for two pianos
  - L'homme armé
- Edison Denisov –
  - Osen′ (Autumn), for 13 solo voices
  - Oda, pamyati Khe Gevara (Ode in Memory of Che Guevara)
  - Romanticheskaya muzïka (Romantic Music)
- Cristóbal Halffter –
  - Symposion
  - Yes, Speak Out, Yes
- Roy Harris –
  - Symphony no. 12
  - Concerto for Amplified Piano, Brass, Double Bass, and Percussion
  - Sonata for Cello and Piano (revised version)
- Hans Werner Henze – Das Floß der Medusa
- Heinz Holliger – h for wind quintet
- Karel Husa – Music for Prague 1968
- Wojciech Kilar – Training 68 for clarinet, trombone, cello and piano
- Ladislav Kupkovic – Souvenir (one of his few recorded works)
- Helmut Lachenmann – temA for flute, voice and cello
- György Ligeti – Zehn Stücke für Bläserquintett (Ten Pieces for Wind Quintet)
- Witold Lutosławski – Livre pour orchestre
- Ester Mägi – Symphony
- Krzysztof Meyer – Sonatas for Piano, No. 4
- Bo Nilsson – Attraktionen, for string quartet
- Per Nørgård –
  - Rejse ind i den gyldne skærm (Voyage into the Golden Screen)
  - Concerto for Accordion Recall
- Arvo Pärt – "Credo" for piano, chorus and orchestra
- Krzysztof Penderecki – St Luke Passion (Penderecki)
- John Serry Sr. – Processional for Organ
- Roger Sessions – Symphony no. 8
- Dmitri Shostakovich –
  - String Quartet no. 12 in D♭ major, op. 133
  - Sonata for Violin and Piano in D major, op. 134
- Karlheinz Stockhausen –
  - Aus den sieben Tagen
  - Kurzwellen
  - Stimmung
  - Spiral
- John Tavener – The Whale (cantata)
- David Tudor & Lowell Cross – Reunion
- Charles Wuorinen –
  - Flute Variations II
  - String Trio
- Iannis Xenakis – Nomos Gamma for 98 musicians dispersed among the audience

== Opera ==
- Benjamin Britten – The Prodigal Son (church parable)
- Carlos Chávez – Los visitantes (revision of Panfilo e Lauretta)
- Peter Maxwell Davies – Revelation and Fall
- Gian Carlo Menotti – Help, Help, the Globolinks!
- Ástor Piazzolla – María de Buenos Aires

== Musical theater ==
- Cabaret (Kander and Ebb) – London production
- Canterbury Tales London production
- Dames at Sea Off-Broadway production opened at the Bouwerie Lane Theatre on December 20 and transferred to the Theatre de Lys on April 22, 1969, for a total run of 575 performances.
- The Dancing Years (Ivor Novello) – London revival
- Darling of the Day (w. E. Y. Harburg m. Jule Styne) Broadway production opened at the George Abbott Theatre on January 27 and ran for 31 performances. Starred Patricia Routledge and Vincent Price
- George M! Broadway production opened at the Palace Theatre and ran for 433 performances
- Golden Boy London production
- Golden Rainbow Broadway production opened at the George Abbott Theatre and ran for 388 performances
- Hair – Broadway (1,750 performances) and London (1,997 performances) productions
- House of Flowers off-Broadway revival
- Lady, Be Good! London revival
- Man of La Mancha London production
- Promises, Promises Broadway production opened at the Shubert Theatre and ran for 1,281 performances
- The Happy Time Broadway production opened at the Broadway Theatre and ran for 286 performances
- Zorba – after the movie (Zorba the Greek, 1964) and book (Nikos Kazantzakis, 1952).1969 Tony Award for Best Musical and numerous other nominations, 1969 Drama Desk Award for Outstanding Lyrics (to Fred Ebb, the first year of that category) and three other nominations. 305 performances starting 11/16/68 at the Imperial Theatre, NY. (Revival 9/16/83 at the Broadway Theatre, NY, ran 362 performances with 1984 Theatre World Award to actor Robert Westenberg.)

== Musical films ==
- Aashirwad
- Bhagyamudra
- Les Bicyclettes de Belsize
- Chitty Chitty Bang Bang
- Finian's Rainbow
- Funny Girl
- Head – starring The Monkees and written by Jack Nicholson.
- The Jungle Book – animated feature film
- Monterey Pop
- The Night They Raided Minsky's – released December 22 starring Jason Robards and Britt Ekland
- Oliver!
- The One and Only, Genuine, Original Family Band
- Star!
- Yellow Submarine – animated feature film

== Births ==
- January 1 – Rick J. Jordan, German music composer and multi-instrumentalist (Scooter)
- January 5 – DJ BoBo, Swiss singer, rapper, songwriter and dancer
- January 9 – Al Schnier, American rock guitarist
- January 11 – Tom Dumont, American guitarist
- January 13 – Kim Gun-mo, South Korean singer and songwriter
- January 14 – LL Cool J, American rapper and actor
- January 19 – Ikuko Kawai, Japanese classic violinist and composer
- January 27
  - Mike Patton, American alternative metal vocalist and producer (Faith No More)
  - Deb Talan, American singer-songwriter and guitarist (The Weepies)
  - Tricky, English rapper and songwriter
- January 28
  - Sarah McLachlan, Canadian singer-songwriter
  - DJ Muggs, American trip hop musician (Cypress Hill)
  - Rakim, American rapper
- February 1 – Lisa Marie Presley, American singer-songwriter (daughter of Elvis and Priscilla Presley) (died 2023)
- February 4 – Marko Matvere, Estonian actor and singer
- February 5 – Chris Barron, American alternative rock singer-songwriter (Spin Doctors)
- February 7 – Sully Erna, American singer-songwriter and guitarist (Godsmack and Meliah Rage)
- February 12
  - Gregory Charles, Canadian singer, dancer, pianist and actor
  - Chynna Phillips, American pop singer (Wilson Phillips) and actress (daughter of John & Michelle Phillips of the Mamas & the Papas)
- February 13
  - Ahlam, Emirati singer and actress
  - Niamh Kavanagh, Irish singer
- February 15 – Gloria Trevi, Mexican singer-songwriter
- February 19 – Stochelo Rosenberg, Dutch Gypsy jazz guitarist
- February 22 – Brad Nowell, American ska punk musician (Sublime) (died 1996)
- February 23 – Johan Gielen, Belgian trance musician, DJ and remixer
- February 25
  - Evridiki, Cypriot singer
  - Oumou Sangaré, Malian Wassoulou singer
- February 26 – Tim Commerford, American bassist (Audioslave)
- March 3 – Brian Cox, English physicist and musician (D Ream)
- March 4 – Patsy Kensit, British actress and singer
- March 7 – Tarkan Tüzmen, Turkish singer and actor
- March 8 – Shawn Mullins, American singer-songwriter
- March 10 – Alma Čardžić, Bosnian singer
- March 11
  - Lisa Loeb, American singer-songwriter
  - Paul Turner, English bassist (Jamiroquai)
- March 15
  - Kahimi Karie, Japanese singer
  - Mark McGrath, American rock singer (Sugar Ray) and television presenter
  - Jon Schaffer, American heavy metal guitarist and singer-songwriter (Iced Earth)
  - Sabrina Salerno, Italian singer
- March 20
  - Ultra Naté, American singer, songwriter, DJ, record producer and promoter
  - Buckwild, American record producer and DJ
- March 23 – Damon Albarn, British singer (Blur and Gorillaz)
- March 26
  - Kenny Chesney, American country singer
  - James Iha, American alternative rock guitarist (The Smashing Pumpkins)
- March 29 – Lucy Lawless, New Zealand born singer and actress
- March 30 – Céline Dion, Canadian singer-songwriter
- April 1 – Julia Boutros, Lebanese singer
- April 3
  - Sebastian Bach (Sebastian Philip Bierk), Canadian-born heavy metal singer (Skid Row)
  - Jamie Hewlett, English comic book artist and illustrator
- April 5 – Diamond D, American record producer and rapper
- April 9 – Cutfather, Danish music producer, songwriter, DJ and remixer
- April 12 – Toby Gad, Los Angeles based German singer-songwriter/music producer (The Veronicas, Madonna, Leona Lewis, Hilary Duff)
- April 15 – Ed O'Brien, English Guitarist and songwriter (Radiohead)
- April 16 – Boudewijn Vincent Bonebakker, Dutch rock guitarrista (Gorefest)
- April 17 – K-Solo, American rapper
- April 19 – Ashley Judd, American actress and activist (sister of Wynonna Judd)
- April 26
  - Angela Santomero, American executive producer and co-creator
  - Corrinne Wicks, English actress
- April 28 – Howard Donald, British singer and dancer (Take That)
- April 29 – Carnie Wilson, pop singer (Wilson Phillips), daughter of Brian Wilson
- May 1 – D'arcy Wretzky (The Smashing Pumpkins)
- May 6 – Shin Hae-chul, South Korean singer-songwriter (NEXT) (d. 2014)
- May 7 – Eagle-Eye Cherry, Swedish singer and stage performer
- May 8 – Ivan Mikulić, Croatian singer
- May 12 – PMD, American rapper (EPMD)
- May 16
  - Ralph Tresvant (New Edition)
  - Maja Blagdan, Croatian pop singer
- May 19 – Kyle Eastwood, American musician and composer
- May 28 – Kylie Minogue, Australian singer, songwriter, actress, dancer, music producer and philanthropist
- June 1 – Jason Donovan, Australian actor and singer
- June 3 – Saffron, English singer (Republica)
- June 4 – Al B. Sure!, American R&B singer-songwriter
- June 6 – Alan Licht, American guitarist, composer and journalist (Run On)
- June 8 – Black Rob, American rapper (died 2021)
- June 10 – The D.O.C., African-American rapper
- June 12 – Bobby Sheehan (Blues Traveler)
- June 13
  - David Gray, British folk rock singer-songwriter
  - Denise Pearson, British singer (Five Star)
- June 21 – DJ Scratch, American disc jockey and producer (Flipmode Squad)
- June 25 – Marc Roberts, Irish singer
- June 28
  - Tanja Ribič, Slovenian actress and singer
  - Chayanne, Puerto Rican-American singer, songwriter and actor
- June 30 – Phil Anselmo (Pantera)
- July 4 – Jack Frost, American guitarist and songwriter (Seven Witches and The Bronx Casket Co.)
- July 5 – Nardwuar, Canadian singer-songwriter and keyboard player (The Evaporators)
- July 7 – Antonello Palombi, Italian operatic tenor (d. 2026)
- July 10 – Claudia Pop, Romanian soprano and opera stage director, Doctor in Music, senior lecturer
- July 11 – Chu Ga-yeoul, South Korean singer and songwriter
- July 12 – Chucky Thompson, American record producer (d. 2021)
- July 16 – Olga Souza ("Corona"), Brazilian singer and dancer
- July 17 – Julian Gallagher, English songwriter and record producer (Mel B and Emma Bunton)
- July 19 – Robert Flynn, American musician
- July 19 – Aya Sugimoto, Japanese actress and singer
- July 20 – Kool G Rap, American rapper
- July 22 – Rhys Ifans, actor, previously vocalist with Super Furry Animals
- July 24 – Kristin Chenoweth, American actress and singer
- July 30 – Elvis Crespo, Puerto Rican singer
- August 1 – Dan Donegan, American rock musician (Disturbed)
- August 2 – John Stanier, American drummer (Helmet, Tomahawk, The Mark of Cain and Battles)
- August 9 – Sam Fogarino, American drummer (Interpol)
- August 10 – Michael Bivins, New Edition, Bell Biv Devoe
- August 11 – Charlie Sexton, American guitarist, singer and songwriter
- August 12 – Paul Tucker, British musician (Lighthouse Family)
- August 13 – Tal Bachman, Canadian singer-songwriter and guitarist
- August 17 – Dave Hollister, American R&B singer-songwriter
- August 19 – Mark McGuinn, American country singer (d. 2026)
- August 21 – Dina Carroll, British singer
- August 25 – Stuart Murdoch, Scottish singer, songwriter and guitarist (Belle and Sebastian)
- September 1 – Regina "Queen" Saraiva, Brazilian actress and singer
- September 5 – Brad Wilk, American drummer (Greta)
- September 6 – Paddy Boom, American drummer (Scissor Sisters)
- September 10 – Big Daddy Kane, American rapper
- September 11 – Kay Hanley (Letters To Cleo)
- September 12
  - Ler LaLonde (Primus, Possessed)
  - Kenny Thomas, English singer
- September 13 – Mike Davenport (The Ataris)
- September 16 – Marc Anthony, American singer and actor
- September 17
  - Anastacia, American singer-songwriter
  - Lord Jamar, American rapper, DJ, record producer, actor and podcaster (Brand Nubian)
- September 20 – Ben Shepherd (Soundgarden)
- September 21 – David Jude Jolicoeur aka Trugoy the Dove, American rapper and record producer (De La Soul) (died 2023)
- September 25
  - Will Smith, American rapper, actor, producer, comedian and singer-songwriter (DJ Jazzy Jeff & The Fresh Prince, DJ Jazzy Jeff, The Fresh Prince of Bel-Air)
  - Catherine Zeta-Jones, Welsh-born actress, singer and dancer
- September 29
  - Matt Goss, English singer, songwriter and musician (Bros)
  - Luke Goss, English actor and drummer (Bros)
- October 1
  - Kevin Griffin (Better Than Ezra)
  - Sagol 59, Israeli rapper
- October 2 – Kelly Willis, American country singer-songwriter
- October 3 – Sevil Hajiyeva, Azerbaijani singer
- October 5 – Nana, rapper
- October 6 – Dominique A, French singer-songwriter
- October 7
  - Thom Yorke, British musician (Radiohead)
  - Luminița Anghel, Romanian singer, television personality and politician
- October 8
  - CL Smooth, African-American rapper
  - Leeroy Thornhill, English keyboardist (The Prodigy)
- October 11 – Jane Krakowski, American actress and singer
- October 12 – Hugh Jackman, Australian actor, dancer and singer
- October 14 – Johnny Goudie, American musician
- October 16 – DJ Alamo, American DJ and record producer (Brand Nubian)
- October 17 – Ziggy Marley, Jamaican reggae artist
- October 17 – Alejandra Ávalos, Mexican musician and actress
- October 19 – Rodney Carrington, American stand-up comic and country musician
- October 21 – Martin Creed, English artist, composer and performer
- October 22 – Shaggy, Jamaican-American reggae & dancehall singer
- October 24 – Kim Sanders, German singer and songwriter (Culture Beat)
- October 29 – Tsunku, Japanese singer, record producer and songwriter (Sharam Q)
- October 30 – Kiyoharu, Japanese singer-songwriter
- October 31 – Ally McErlaine, Scottish guitarist (Texas)
- November 4 – Troy McLawhorn, American guitarist (Evanescence)
- November 5 – Nicoleta Alexandru, Romanian singer
- November 6 – Eric Singleton, American rapper
- November 9 – Nazzareno Carusi, Italian pianist
- November 10 – Steve Brookstein, British singer
- November 12 – Kathleen Hanna, riot grrrl pioneer, American singer (Bikini Kill)
- November 14 – Ken Ford, jazz violinist
- November 15
  - Jennifer Charles, American singer
  - Ol' Dirty Bastard, American rapper (died 2004)
- November 21 – Alex James, British bassist (Blur)
- November 25
  - Tunde Baiyewu, British singer (Lighthouse Family)
  - Erick Sermon, American rapper and producer (EPMD)
- November 28 – Dawn Robinson, American singer (En Vogue)
- November 29
  - Martin Carr (Boo Radleys)
  - Jonathan Knight, American singer (New Kids on the Block)
- November 30 – Des'ree, English singer and songwriter
- December 2
  - Lucy Liu, American actress, director, film producer, singer and artist
  - Nate Mendel (Foo Fighters)
- December 3 – Montell Jordan, American R&B singer, songwriter, and record producer
- December 9
  - Brian Bell (Weezer)
  - David Brandes, German group (E-Rotic)
- December 10 – Yōko Oginome, Japanese singer/songwriter
- December 12
  - Tatiana, Mexican singer
  - Danny Boyle, American rapper (House of Pain)
- December 14 – King T, American rapper
- December 16 – Lalah Hathaway, American singer and daughter of Donny Hathaway
- December 17 – Yvette Michele, American R&B singer and songwriter
- December 20 – Billy Mann, American songwriter, record producer, creative executive, music publisher and founder/CEO (P1Nk, Delta Goodrem, Cher, Robyn)
- December 29
  - Glen Phillips (Toad the Wet Sprocket)
  - Sadat X, American rapper

== Deaths ==
- January 18 – Gribouille, French chanteuse, 26 (alcohol and drug-related)
- February 5 – Luckey Roberts, ragtime composer and pianist, 80
- February 13
  - Ildebrando Pizzetti, composer, 87
  - Portia White, contralto singer, 56
- February 15 – Little Walter, blues singer and harmonica player, 37
- February 27 – Frankie Lymon, American doo-wop singer, 25 (heroin overdose)
- February 28 – Doretta Morrow, dancer, 40 (cancer)
- March 6 – Iša Krejčí, composer and conductor, 63
- March 10 – Blind Joe Reynolds, blues singer-songwriter
- March 16 – Mario Castelnuovo-Tedesco, composer, 72
- April 15 – Borys Lyatoshynsky, composer, 73
- April 25 – Harald Kreutzberg, dancer and choreographer, 65
- May 15 – Florence Austral, operatic soprano, 76
- May 19 – Coleman Hawkins, jazz tenor saxophonist, 64
- May 24 – Bernard Rogers, composer, 75
- May 26 – Little Willie John, R&B singer, 30 (heart attack in prison)
- June 2 – André Mathieu, pianist and composer, 39
- June 8 – Bumble Bee Slim, Piedmont blues musician, 63
- June 14 – Karl-Birger Blomdahl, composer and conductor, 51
- June 15 – Wes Montgomery, jazz guitarist, 45 (heart attack)
- June 26 – Ziggy Elman, US trumpet player, 54
- July 21 – Ruth St. Denis, dancer, 89
- July 27 – Lilian Harvey, actress and singer, 62
- July 28 – Carl Ravazza, US violinist, vocalist and bandleader, 58
- July 30 – Jón Leifs, composer, 69
- August 5 – Luther Perkins, guitarist of The Tennessee Two, 40 (burns and smoke inhalation following a house fire)
- August 15 – Luis Gianneo, Argentine composer, pianist and conductor, 71
- August 18 – Arthur Marshall, ragtime composer, 86
- September 19 – Red Foley, country singer, 58
- October 8 – Frank Skinner, film composer, 70
- October 15 – Franz Reizenstein, pianist and composer, 57
- October 20 – Bud Flanagan, music hall star, 72
- October 30 – Pops Foster, jazz musician, 77
- November 6 – Charles Munch, French conductor, 77 (heart attack)
- November 8 – Kokomo Arnold, American blues musician, 67
- November 9 – Jan Johansson, Swedish jazz pianist, 37 (car crash)
- November 11 – Jeanne Demessieux, French organist, pianist and composer, 47 (embolism)
- November 27 – Hans Redlich, Austrian composer and musicologist, 65
- December 1 – Nicolae Bretan, composer, 81
- December 9 – Percy Greenbank, lyricist, 90
- December 14 – Margarete Klose, operatic mezzo-soprano, 69
- December 19 – Tiberiu Brediceanu, composer, 91
- December 31 – Sabin Drăgoi, composer, 74
- date unknown
  - Juan F. Acosta, composer and music teacher
  - Lucille Dompierre, pianist and arranger
  - Billy Pigg, bagpiper
  - Vincenzo Scaramuzza, pianist

== Awards ==
=== Grammy Awards ===
- Grammy Awards of 1968

=== Eurovision Song Contest ===
- Eurovision Song Contest 1968
