= 1968 in jazz =

- Decade: 1960s in jazz
- Music: 1968 in music
- Standards: List of post-1950 jazz standards
- See also: 1967 in jazz – 1969 in jazz

This is a timeline documenting events of Jazz in the year 1968.

== Events ==
=== June ===
- 12 – The 2nd Montreux Jazz Festival started in Montreux, Switzerland (June 12 – 18).
- 30 – The 15th Newport Jazz Festival started in Newport, Rhode Island (June 30 – July 3).

=== Unknown date ===
- The English avant-rock ensemble Henry Cow was founded at Cambridge University.

== Album releases ==
- Peter Brötzmann: Machine Gun
- Don Cherry: Eternal Rhythm
- Chick Corea: Now He Sings, Now He Sobs
- Miles Davis: Filles de Kilimanjaro
- Bill Evans: Bill Evans at the Montreux Jazz Festival
- Milt Jackson: Milt Jackson and the Hip String Quartet
- Roland Kirk: Left & Right
- Michael Mantler: The Jazz Composer's Orchestra
- Hugh Masekela: The Promise of a Future
- Roscoe Mitchell: Congliptious
- Modern Jazz Quartet: Under the Jasmin Tree
- Sun Ra: Outer Spaceways Incorporated
- Horace Silver: Serenade to a Soul Sister
- Spontaneous Music Ensemble: Karyobin
- John Surman: John Surman
- McCoy Tyner: Tender Moments
- Kenny Wheeler: Windmill Tilter
- Gary Bartz: Another Earth
- Pat Martino: Baiyina (The Clear Evidence)
- Charles Tolliver: Paper Man
- Herbie Hancock: Speak Like a Child
- Miles Davis: Miles in the Sky
- Hugh Masekela: The Lasting Impression of Hugh Masekela
- Hugh Masekela: Africa '68

== Deaths ==
February

- 5 – Luckey Roberts, American composer and stride pianistr (born 1887).
- 15 – Little Walter, American singer and harmonica player (born 1930).
- 27 – Frankie Lymon, American singer (heroin overdose) (born 1942).

March

- 5 – Monk Hazel, American drummer (born 1903).

June

- 15 – Wes Montgomery, American guitarist (born 1923).
- 26 – Ziggy Elman, American trumpeter (born 1914).

October

- 18
  - Jack Bland, American banjoist and guitarist (born 1899).
  - Eyvin Andersen, Danish organist, violinist, and composer (born 1914).

November

- 9 – Jan Johansson, Swedish pianist (born 1931)
- 23 – Reinhold Svensson, Swedish pianist, Hammond organist, and composer (born 1919).

December

- 31 – George Lewis, American clarinetist (born 1900).

Unknown date

- Jay Wilbur, British bandleader (born 1898).

== Births ==
January

- 19 – Jørn Øien, Norwegian pianist.
- 21 – Frank Kvinge, Norwegian guitarist.

February

- 4 – Tim Lefebvre, American bass guitarist.
- 18 – Jukka Perko, Finnish saxophonist.
- 19 – Stochelo Rosenberg, Dutch guitarist.
- 22 – Rodney Whitaker, American upright bassist.

March

- 1 – Per Oddvar Johansen, Norwegian drummer.
- 2 – Rune Brøndbo, Norwegian keyboardist and guitarist.
- 6 – Jakob Dinesen, Danish saxophonist.
- 21 – Vincent Courtois, French cellist.
- 22 – Arve Henriksen, Norwegian trumpeter and multiinstrumentalist.
- 24 – Sherman Irby, American alto saxophonist.

April

- 30 – Russ Nolan, American saxophonist.

May

- 1 – D'arcy Wretzky American bassist, The Smashing Pumpkins.
- 9 – Anthony Wilson, American guitarist.
- 19 – Kyle Eastwood, American bassist.

June

- 6 – Alan Licht, American guitarist, composer, and journalist, Run On.
- 19 – John Hollenbeck, American drummer and composer, The Claudia Quintet.

July

- 10 – David Gald, Norwegian guitarist.
- 16 – Finn Guttormsen, Norwegian bassist.
- 17 – Julia Hülsmann, German pianist and composer.

August

- 4 – Eric Alexander, American saxophonist.
- 18 – Ernie Hammes, Luxembourgian trumpeter, arranger, composer, and big band director.
- 20 – Frode Barth, Norwegian guitarist.
- 28 – Larry Goldings, American pianist, organist, and composer.
- 30 – Vahagn Hayrapetyan, Armenian pianist, singer, and composer.

September

- 9 – David Sánchez, Puerto Rican tenor saxophonist.
- 13 – Bernie Williams, Puerto Rican former professional baseball player and musician.
- 30 – Antonio Hart, American alto saxophonist.

November

- 14 – Ken Ford, American violinist.
- 30 – Sylvie Courvoisier, Swiss composer, pianist, and improviser.

December

- 7 – Noël Akchoté, French guitarist.
- 16 – Lalah Hathaway, American singer.

Unknown date

- Jean David Blanc, French film producer, writer, and jazz musician.

== See also ==
- 1960s in jazz
- List of years in jazz
- 1968 in music
