= Heart of Cash =

The Heart of Johnny Cash

Compilation album by Johnny Cash
- Released: 1968
- Recorded: 1958–1968
- Genre: Country; folk
- Length: 49:25
- Label: Columbia
- Producer: Don Law, Frank Jones

Johnny Cash chronology
Old Golden Throat (1968)	The Heart of Johnny Cash (1968)	The Holy Land (1969)

The Heart of Johnny Cash is the 29th overall album released by country singer Johnny Cash. It was released in 1968 (see 1968 in music). In essence, it is a compilation album, though a handful of new recordings were included. Three songs from the album became moderately successful singles, while a version of "Girl in Saskatoon" was released on Personal File in 2006. The album was only available via Television marketing sales, and was not released to retail stores. It has not been released on CD.

== Track listing ==
Source for track listing:

No.	Title	Writer(s)	Length
1.	"I Walk the Line"	Johnny Cash	2:42
2.	"Lumberjack"	Leon Payne	2:48
3.	"Five Feet High and Rising"	Johnny Cash	1:49
4.	"I Got Stripes" (Live at Folsom Prison, January 13, 1968)	Johnny Cash, Charlie Williams	2:02
5.	"Green, Green Grass of Home" (Live at Folsom Prison, January 13, 1968)	Curly Putman	2:18
6.	"Why Do You Punish Me (for Loving You)"	Erwin King	2:21
7.	"Frankie's Man Johnny"	Johnny Cash	2:19
8.	"A Certain Kinda Hurtin'"	Johnny Cash	2:05
9.	"Mean as Hell"	Johnny Cash	3:08
10.	"Locomotive Man"	Johnny Cash	2:48
11.	"Folsom Prison Blues"	Johnny Cash	2:50
12.	"Don't Take Your Guns to Town"	Johnny Cash	3:02
13.	"The Matador"	Johnny Cash, June Carter	2:49
14.	"Long Black Veil"	Danny Dill, Marijohn Wilkin	3:10
15.	"The Sons of Katie Elder"	Earl Sheldon, Elmer Bernstein	2:39
16.	"The Ballad of Boot Hill"	Carl Perkins	2:36
17.	"Happiness Is You"	Johnny Cash, June Carter	2:58
18.	"When I've Learned Enough to Die"	Johnny Cash	2:45
19.	"Girl in Saskatoon" (1960 single, previously unreleased on LP)	Johnny Cash, Johnny Horton	2:16
20.	"Ancient History"	Irene Stanton, Wayne Walker	2:18
Total length:			49:25
