= Spontaneous combustion (disambiguation) =

Spontaneous combustion is the self-ignition of a mass, for example, a pile of oily rags. Allegedly, humans can also ignite and burn without an obvious cause; this phenomenon is known as spontaneous human combustion.

Spontaneous Combustion is also the name of:

- Spontaneous Combustion (album), a 2007 album by Liquid Trio Experiment
- Spontaneous Combustion (film), a 1990 film by Tobe Hooper
- "Spontaneous Combustion" (South Park), an episode of the South Park television series
- Spontaneous Combustion (American band), US bluegrass/rock fusion band of the 1990s
- Spontaneous Combustion (English band), English progressive rock band of the 1970s
- "Spontaneous Combustion", a song from Ted Nugent's 1981 live album Intensities in 10 Cities
