= Girl Watcher =

Single by The O'Kaysions

from the album Girl Watcher
- B-side: "Deal Me In"
- Released: March 1968 (Original US release); June 1968 (Second US release)
- Genre: Blue-eyed soul
- Length: 2:35
- Label: ABC
- Songwriters: Ronald B. Killette, Wayne Pittman
- Producer: North State Music

The O'Kaysions singles chronology
"Girl Watcher" (1968)	"Love Machine" (1968)

"Girl Watcher" is a song written by Ronald B. Killette and Wayne Pittman and performed by The O'Kaysions. It was produced by North State Music. The single was first released in March 1968 on North State Records, but it did not become a hit until re-released in June 1968 on ABC Records.

"Girl Watcher" received gold record status for a million sales from the R.I.A.A. in December 1968.

== Chart performance ==
It reached No.5 on the Billboard Hot 100 and #6 on the Billboard Hot Rhythm & Blues Singles chart in 1968 and was featured on the group's 1968 album, Girl Watcher.

The single ranked No.45 on the Billboard Year-End Hot 100 singles of 1968.

== Certifications ==
Certifications for "Girl Watcher"
Region	Certification	Certified units/sales
United States (RIAA)	Gold	1,000,000^{^}
^{^} Shipments figures based on certification alone.

== Other versions ==
- Tam White, as a single in 1968 in the UK.
- In the '80s, the long-running syndicated game show Wheel of Fortune commissioned a promotional version with adapted lyrics titled "I'm a Wheel Watcher" and was also used on the show itself when Vanna White was introduced. The Italian version titled La Ruota Della Fortuna ("The Wheel of Fortune") has a theme song called "Gira la Ruota" ("Spin the Wheel") that sounds very similar to "I'm a Wheel Watcher", which could've been the inspiration for it was used from 1995 until 2009.
- Spontaneous Combustion, on their 2004 album Strike Anywhere.
- Beau Jocque and the Zydeco Hi-Rollers, with the title "I'm a Girl Watcher", on the 1999 album Zydeco Giant.
- In the Nickelodeon show Zoey 101 episode "Dance Contest", the song is remade to "I'm a Contender" by Scott Bennett in 2007.
