= Eilts =

Eilts is a surname. Notable people with the surname include:

- Dieter Eilts (born 1964), German footballer
- Hermann Eilts (1922–2006), United States Foreign Service Officer and diplomat
- Roger and Leo Eilts, members of the band Spontaneous Combustion
