= The Wind Changes =

Single by Johnny Cash

from the album Old Golden Throat
- A-side: "Red Velvet" "The Wind Changes"
- Released: 1967
- Genre: country
- Label: Columbia 4-44288
- Songwriter: Johnny Cash
- Producers: Don Law and Frank Jones

Audio
- "The Wind Changes" on YouTube

"The Wind Changes" is a song written and originally recorded by Johnny Cash.

Released in September 1967 as a single (Columbia 4-44288, with "Red Velvet" on the opposite side), it debuted on the U.S. Billboard country chart on the week of October 28, eventually reaching number 60.

Later the song was included on Johnny Cash's album Old Golden Throat (1968).

== Track listing ==
7" single (Columbia 4-44288, 1967)
No.	Title	Writer(s)	Length
1.	"Red Velvet"	I. Tyson	2:43
2.	"The Wind Changes"	J. Cash	2:46

== Charts ==
Chart (1967)	Peak position
US Hot Country Songs (Billboard)	60
