= You Beat All I Ever Saw =

Single by Johnny Cash

from the album More of Old Golden Throat
- A-side: "You Beat All I Ever Saw" "Put the Sugar to Bed"
- Released: November 1966
- Genre: country
- Label: Columbia 4-43921
- Songwriter: Johnny Cash
- Producers: Don Law and Frank Jones

Audio
- "You Beat All I Ever Saw" on YouTube

"You Beat All I Ever Saw" is a song written and originally recorded by Johnny Cash.

Released in November 1966 as a single (Columbia 4-43921, with "Put the Sugar to Bed" on the opposite side), it debuted on the U.S. Billboard country chart at number 66 on the week of December 24, eventually reaching number 20. On the Cash Box country chart, the song peaked at number 28

Later the song was included on the U.K. compilation album More of Old Golden Throat (1969).

== Background and analysis ==
On the way back to that fire, Cash recorded two songs for single release on November 1, 1966. The A-side was a Cash-penned tune called "You Beat All I Ever Saw," another run at using bold trumpets. The flip side was a cowrite with Mother Maybelle Carter, "Put the Sugar to Bed." The most notable thing about both cuts is the extremely fuzzedout guitar that bubbles in the background of the former and then takes center stage on the latter.

Columbia placed a half-page ad in Billboard to declare the single to be "Hard Cash. Country and Western and man of the world. A modern troubadour who doesn't mince words. When John cuts a single, it's an event. And everyone shares the experience." n the event, "You Beat All I Ever Saw" only made it to #20 before beginning to drop and make room for the next single, a duet with June Carter that would return Cash to the top of the charts.

— C. Eric Banister. Johnny Cash FAQ: All That's Left to Know About the Man in Black

== Track listing ==
7" single (Columbia 4-43921, 1966)
No.	Title	Writer(s)	Length
1.	"You Beat All I Ever Saw"	J. Cash	3:11
2.	"Put the Sugar to Bed"	J. Cash, M. Carter	1:58

== Charts ==
Chart (1966–1967)	Peak position
US Hot Country Songs (Billboard)	20
