= Hugh Masekela Is Alive and Well at the Whisky =

Live album by Hugh Masekela
- Released: 1967
- Recorded: 18 to 20 September 1967
- Venue: Whisky a Go Go, Hollywood, California
- Genre: Jazz
- Length: 33:35
- Label: Uni Records 3015, 73015
- Producer: Stewart Levine

Hugh Masekela chronology
Hugh Masekela's Latest (1967)	Hugh Masekela Is Alive and Well at the Whisky (1967)	The Promise of a Future (1968)

Professional ratings
Review scores
Source	Rating
The Encyclopedia of Popular Music	3/5 stars

Hugh Masekela Is Alive and Well at the Whisky is a 1967 live album by South African jazz musician Hugh Masekela released via Uni Records label. It was recorded live at the night club Whisky a Go Go, Hollywood, California, in 18 to 20 September 1967. The song "Up, Up and Away" was later included in his 2004 album Still Grazing.

== Track listing ==
No.	Title	Writer(s)	Length
1.	"Mra" (Christopher Columbus)	Caiphus Semenya	3:57
2.	"Little Miss Sweetness"	Smokey Robinson	3:32
3.	"A Whiter Shade of Pale"	Gary Brooker, Keith Reid	2:58
4.	"Up, Up and Away"	Jimmy Webb	5:25
5.	"Son of an Ice Bag"	Hugh Masekela	3:45
6.	"Senor Corãza"	Al Abreu	7:50
7.	"Coincidence"	Hugh Masekela	3:10
8.	"Ha Lese Le Di Khanna"	Caiphus Semenya	2:58

== Personnel ==
- Bass – Henry Franklin
- Cover design, photography – Jeffery Eisen
- Drums – Chuck Carter
- Percussion – Elmer Siegel (uncredited)
- Piano – Cecil Barnard
- Producer – Stewart Levine
- Saxophone – Al Abreu
- Trumpet, vocals – Hugh Masekela (uncredited)
