= Red Velvet (song) =

Song by Johnny Cash

Single by Johnny Cash

from the album Old Golden Throat
- A-side: "Red Velvet"
- B-side: "The Wind Changes"
- Released: 1967
- Genre: country
- Label: Columbia 4-44288
- Songwriter: Ian Tyson
- Producers: Don Law and Frank Jones

Audio
- "Red Velvet" on YouTube

"Red Velvet" is a song written by Ian Tyson. While the Johnny Cash version is the best known, it was first recorded by Ian & Sylvia Tyson in 1965 on their album Early Morning Rain.

Recorded by Cash at the Columbia Studios in Nashville, Tennessee, the song was released in September 1967 as a single (Columbia 4-44288, with "The Wind Changes" on the opposite side). It was later included on his album Old Golden Throat (1968).

Billboard magazine gave the song a "Country Spotlight" review, stating: "Folkster Ian Tyson's plaintive ballad serves as potent material for Cash as he performs it in his compelling and winning style. Another big Cash hit." Actually, it did not chart at all. "The Wind Changes" made it to 60 on the Billboard country chart, then dropped off completely after only six weeks.

== Analysis ==
During the sessions for From Sea to Shining Sea Cash recorded "Red Velvet." [...] It's a truly inspired piece of writing from Tyson, and a song Cash was immediately drawn to. Cash once remarked that he usually had good ears for picking a hit song, and he thought this song would be a huge hit for him. Ultimately it wasn't, but it should have been. It's a beautiful, descriptive westernthemed story with poetic lyrics. It tells about a girl who comes down on a day coach to be with her boyfriend, told very well and nicely sung.

— John M. Alexander. The Man in Song: A Discographic Biography of Johnny Cash

== Other Versions ==
- Gordon Lightfoot included it on a 1998 album, A Painter Passing Through.
- Tom Russell includes the song in his tribute album to Ian & Sylvia, Play One More - The Songs of Ian & Sylvia, 2017.

== Track listing ==
7" single (Columbia 4-44288, 1967)
No.	Title	Writer(s)	Length
1.	"Red Velvet"	I. Tyson	2:43
2.	"The Wind Changes"	J. Cash	2:46
