= Hugh Masekela's Latest =

Studio album by Hugh Masekela
- Released: 1967
- Recorded: Los Angeles (probably)
- Genre: Jazz
- Length: 35:38
- Label: Uni Records 3010, 73010
- Producer: Stewart Levine

Hugh Masekela chronology
The Emancipation of Hugh Masekela (1966)	Hugh Masekela's Latest (1967)	Hugh Masekela Is Alive and Well at the Whisky (1967)

Professional ratings
Review scores
Source	Rating
The Encyclopedia of Popular Music	3/5 stars

Hugh Masekela's Latest is the sixth studio album by South African jazz trumpeter Hugh Masekela. It was released in 1967 via Uni Records label.

== Track listing ==
No.	Title	Writer(s)	Length
1.	"Baby, Baby, Baby"	Aretha Franklin, Carolyn Franklin, Ted White	2:58
2.	"Society's Child" (Baby I've Been Thinking)	Janis Ian	2:50
3.	"Lily the Fox"	Hugh Masekela	2:33
4.	"Groove Me"	Hugh Masekela	3:38
5.	"Thula"	Hugh Masekela	3:00
6.	"Mago"	Hugh Masekela	2:54
7.	"Arrastao"	Edu Lobo, Vinicius De Moraes	2:49
8.	"Reza" (Laia Ladaia)	Edu Lobo, Ray Guerra	5:29
9.	"I Just Wasn't Meant For These Times"	Brian Wilson, Tony Asher	3:40
10.	"Here, There and Everywhere"	John Lennon, Paul McCartney	4:25
11.	"Mazeze"	Hugh Masekela	1:22
Total length:			35:38

== Personnel ==
- Bass (uncredited) – Harold Dotson, Red Mitchell
- Congas (uncredited) – Big Black
- Cover design – George Whiteman
- Drums (uncredited) – Chuck Carter, Mike McGriff
- Guitar (uncredited) – Barney Kessel, Roy Gaines
- Photography – Jonathan Hayes
- Photography (liner) – Peter Whorf
- Piano (uncredited) – Charlie Smalls, Hotep Cecil Barnard
- Producer – Stewart Levine
- Recorded by – Alan Todd, Doc Seigel, Stan Ross
- Saxophone (uncredited) – Al Abreu
- Trombone (uncredited) – Wayne Henderson
- Trumpet (uncredited) – Hugh Masekela
- Vibraphone (uncredited) – Emil Richards
- Vocals (uncredited) – Hugh Masekela (tracks: 1 2 4 5 9 10)
