= More of Old Golden Throat =

Compilation album by Johnny Cash
- Released: July 1969
- Recorded: 1959–1967
- Genre: Country
- Length: 34:14
- Label: CBS
- Producers: Don Law, Frank Jones

Johnny Cash chronology
At San Quentin (1969)	More of Old Golden Throat (1969)	Hello, I'm Johnny Cash (1970)

More of Old Golden Throat is a compilation album and 32nd overall album released by American country musician Johnny Cash on CBS Records in July 1969 (see 1969 in music). Culled from single sides that had not previously appeared on albums (with the exceptions of "Honky-Tonk Girl" and "Lorena"), it is primarily made up of lesser-known songs, although "You Beat All I Ever Saw" and "Second Honeymoon" reached No. 20 and No. 15 respectively on the Country charts. Tracks 4, 7, 10 and 13 are instrumentals originally credited to "The Tennessee Two and Friend."

As with its predecessor, Old Golden Throat, this album was only available in monaural since its source material was originally mixed for single release.

This album has not been released on CD. Although the Cash solo recordings featured here were later included in the 63-disc 2012 release Johnny Cash: The Complete Columbia Album Collection on the bonus disc titled "The Singles, Plus", the four tracks credited to The Tennessee Two and Friend are omitted and have yet to be officially released on CD.

== Track listing ==
No.	Title	Writer(s)	Original release	Length
1.	"Bottom of the Mountain"	Don McKinnon	"Boa Constrictor" B-side (August 1966)	2:29
2.	"You Beat All I Ever Saw"	Johnny Cash	Single A-side (November 1966)	2:10
3.	"Put the Sugar to Bed"	Johnny Cash, Maybelle Carter	"You Beat All I Ever Saw" B-side (November 1966)	2:24
4.	"Blues for Two" (The Tennessee Two and Friend)	Luther Perkins	Single A-side (January 1961)	2:10
5.	"Girl in Saskatoon"	Johnny Cash, Johnny Horton	Single A-side (December 1960)	2:16
6.	"Time and Time Again"	Johnny Cash, June Carter Cash	"It Ain't Me, Babe" B-side (October 1964)	2:12
7.	"Jeri and Nina's Melody" (The Tennessee Two and Friend)	Marshall Grant, Perkins	"Blues For Two" B-side (January 1961)	2:44
8.	"Honky Tonk Girl"	Chuck Harding, Hank Thompson	"Second Honeymoon" B-side (June 1960)	2:00
9.	"Locomotive Man"	Johnny Cash	"Girl in Saskatoon" B-side (December 1960)	2:50
10.	"Bandana" (The Tennessee Two And Friend)	Johnny Cash	Single A-side (January 1960)	2:15
11.	"Second Honeymoon"	Autry Inman	Single A-side (June 1960)	1:56
12.	"I'll Remember You"	Johnny Cash	"Little Drummer Boy" B-side (October 1959)	2:07
13.	"Wabash Blues" (The Tennessee Two and Friend)	Fred Meinken, Dave Ringle	"Bandana" B-side (January 1960)	2:18
14.	"Lorena"	Charlie Williams	Johnny Yuma EP (1959)	1:56
15.	"Roll Call"	B.J. Carnahan	"Rosanna's Going Wild" B-side (December 1967)	2:27

== Personnel ==
- Johnny Cash - Vocals, Guitar
- Luther Perkins, Johnny Western - Guitar
- Bob Johnson - Guitar, Mandocello
- Norman Blake - Guitar, Dobro
- Marshall Grant - Bass
- Buddy Harman, W.S. Holland, Fury Kazak - Drums
- Floyd Cramer, Harold Bradley, James Wilson - Piano
- Boots Randolph - Saxophone
- The Anita Kerr Singers, The Carter Family - Background Vocals

== Charts ==
Album – Billboard (United States)

Year	Single	Chart	Position
1960	"Second Honeymoon"	Country Singles	15
1960	"Second Honeymoon"	Pop Singles	79
1967	"You Beat All I Ever Saw"	Country Singles	20
