= Girl in Saskatoon =

Single by Johnny Cash

from the album Heart of Cash
- A-side: "Girl in Saskatoon" "Locomotive Man"
- Released: 1960
- Genre: Country, pop
- Length: 2:12
- Label: Columbia 4-41920
- Songwriters: Johnny Cash, Johnny Horton

Johnny Cash singles chronology
"Mean-Eyed Cat" (1960)	"Girl in Saskatoon" (1960)	"Oh Lonesome Me" (1960)

Audio
- "Girl in Saskatoon" on YouTube

"Girl in Saskatoon" is a song co-written by Johnny Cash with Johnny Horton and originally recorded by Cash for Columbia.

It was released as a single (Columbia 4-41920, with "Locomotive Man" on the opposite side). in December 1960, the same month Sun Records released "Oh, Lonesome Me" / "Life Goes On" (Sun 355).

U.S. Billboard picked the song "Girl in Saskatoon" as one of the "Spotlight winners of the week", giving it four stars that corresponded to a "very strong sales potential". The review called the song "another fine folkish effort by Cash" and continued:

It has the quality of one of those old Robert Service poems about the Far North. Solid chanting and it can go.

Nevertheless, the song didn't chart on Billboard at all:

A couple of weeks after Horton's death, Cash and crew recorded "Girl in Saskatoon," a song co-written by Cash and Horton. Both that song and another recorded at the session, “Locomotive Man,” were released as singles. Although promoted heavily by Columbia, neither entered the charts, but songs from his Sun days continued to do so.

— C. Eric Banister. Johnny Cash FAQ: All That's Left to Know About the Man in Black

On the Cash Box country singles chart, "Girl in Saskatoon" reached number 25 during its nine weeks stay.

Later the song was included on Johnny Cash's albums "Heart of Cash" (1968) & "More of Old Golden Throat" (1969).

== Background ==
By the time Cash returned to the road on March 4[, 1960,] in Winnipeg, he had a song idea, albeit a slim one—a story about a guy longing to get home to the girl of his dreams in Saskatoon, somewhat the reverse of "Ballad of a Teenage Queen." He figured he needed to get back on the pop charts, and "The Girl in Saskatoon," which he cowrote with Horton, was certainly closer to a teen pop song than anything he had recorded since leaving Sun.

— Robert Hilburn. Johnny Cash: The Life

John M. Alexander writes in his book The Man in Song: A Discographic Biography of Johnny Cash:

"Girl in Saskatoon" is another exceptional collaboration between Cash and Horton. It's unfortunate that it did not find a wider audience. It was originally released as a single in 1960, but failed to chart. It's a breezy retro ballad wherein the singer follows the girl he's in love with all the way to Saskatoon, Canada, where he ultimately finds her and weds her. And, despite the cold temperatures, he "found eternal spring with the girl in Saskatoon." An interesting side note is that while performing in Saskatoon in 1961, Cash selected a girl from the audience named Alexandra Wiwcharuk to sing the song to. She was a local beauty queen who dreamed of becoming a stewardess. Tragically, a few months later, the young woman was found murdered on the banks of the [South] Saskatchewan River. The story goes that once Cash heard this news he never sang the song again.

== Track listing ==
7" single (Columbia 4-41920, 1967)
No.	Title	Writer(s)	Length
1.	"Girl in Saskatoon"	J. Cash, J. Horton	2:12
2.	"Locomotive Man"	J. Cash	2:49
