= Transformer (David Stoughton album) =

Studio album by David Stoughton
- Released: December 1968
- Genre: Rock; baroque pop; electronic; musique concrète; experimental
- Length: 36:32
- Label: Elektra
- Producer: David Stoughton

Singles from Transformer
- 1. "The Sun Comes Up Each Day" Released: 1969

Transformer is the only album by American musician David Stoughton, released in December 1968 by Elektra Records. Produced by Stoughton, the album is a mix of folk and pop songwriting with sound collages and musique concrète. The musician had drawn influence from composer John Cage and created the group The Cambridge Electric Opera Company to explore electronic and traditionally-based music; although the group perform on the album, it was credited to Stoughton alone to avoid confusion with fellow Elektra band Earth Opera.

A single, "The Sun Comes Up Each Day", was issued from the record. Music critics and listeners were challenged by the album's experimental content; Stoughton noted that people with either "extreme" or "conservative" tastes enjoyed only half the album. Transformer has seen retrospective praise and has been included on numerous magazine reference lists; it has also been re-released digitally.

== Background and recording ==
David Stoughton had been a Harvard mathematician and, from the early 1960s, a performer on the Boston folk circuit, where he played guitar. In 1966, he attended an event where John Cage performed improvisations with painter Robert Rauschenberg and dancer Merce Cunningham; he credited appreciating Cage's "freedom and spirit" with inspiring him to show the composer a tape of two lengthy musique concrète pieces he had created. According to Stoughton, Cage enjoyed the work and the tapes began circulating among the avant-garde community. Additionally, under the influence of John Lennon, he bought a Stratocaster guitar and amplifier to create "Beatle-ish" tunes. Stoughton showed his electronic pieces to his friend Al Capp, who in turn introduced Stoughton to Andy Warhol, who helped inspire the musician to form a group, which he named The Cambridge Electric Opera Company.

Stoughton envisioned the group as an outlet for both his electronic and more traditional-based works, and recruited his former Harvard peer Mal MecKenzie on bass, jazz drummer Joe Livolsi, singer Devi Klate, the classically trained countertenor John Nicholls and a trumpet player and flugelhorn player taken from the Harvard orchestra. Following Newsweek's mention of the group in an article on cutting-edge pop music, Stoughton visited New York City to find a record deal; he was offered deals from Columbia, Warner/Reprise, Capitol and several smaller companies, though the interest of Elektra Records came when the label's publicity head Danny Fields enjoyed hearing Stoughton's electronic music at Warhol's The Factory. (Note: Stoughton reflected on being offered multiple deals: "Nobody in the music business had a clue where things were headed. They didn't dare durn anybody down who had something really weird to offer. And what I had to offer was, indeed, really weird.") Stoughton recalled on presenting his demo tape to Elektra head Jac Holzman:

"I thought Jac was terrific. A truly great personality. Up for anything new. The first song on my demo tape was 'The Anecdote of Horatio and Julie'. Jac sat through it. Expressionless. Then came 'The Sun Comes Up Each Day'. Jac heard about four bars and stopped the tape. I thought he was going to tell me I was history. 'You've got a deal,' he said. 'What do you want, money or freedom?' 'Freedom,' I said. 'Total control over all aspects of content and production."

Recorded in Boston, and written and produced by Stoughton, Transformer exemplifies the influence of Cage's musique concrète on the musician's work. According to critic John Mulvey, some songs, including "The Sun Comes Up Each Day", are comparable to Tim Buckley "at his most extreme", while other songs are "experimental sound collages". David Houghton of Shindig! similarly compared "The Sun Comes Up Each Day" to Buckley and wrote that "Evening Song" "would now pass for acid-folk", whereas "The Anecdote of Horatio & Julie" is a cacophonous, electronic sound collage and "I Don't Know If It's You" is relatively more free form with aleatoric percussion. The album has also been referred to as a work of electronic music, and a "fusion of hippy-dippy songwriting and musique concrète". The record's pop songs show the influence of baroque and renaissance music. Klate sings three songs, including the piece "The Anecdote of Horatio & Julie", while Nicholls sings on "The Sun Comes Up Each Day". The record's second side is sung by Stoughton.

== Release and reception ==
Although Transformer was recorded by the Cambridge Electric Opera Company, the album was credited to Stoughton alone, partly to avoid confusion with fellow Cambridge-based Elektra group Earth Opera. Stoughton recalled that he found the group name increasingly "somewhat derivative", and noted: "I told Jac I'd like to call the album Transformer. Jac said that was fine. The 'produced and created by David Stoughton' credit was Jac's idea. I never even knew about it until they sent me copies of the finished album."

Transformer was released in December 1968 by Elektra, (Note: In their January 11, 1969 issue, Billboard included Transformer among a list of January 1969 releases, but noted that the contents include albums "which were issued during the past several weeks" and are instead "considered as part of the manufacturers' January release.") with "The Sun Comes Up Each Day" issued as a single. In January 1969, the album was issued as a tape cartridge, while in May 1969, Elektra released the album in the United Kingdom as part of their "underground month", alongside albums by Earth Opera, Nico, David Peel, MC5 and the Holy Modal Rounders. (Note: The full list of releases was Transformer, MC5's Kick Out the Jams, Earth Opera's The Great American Eagle Tragedy, David Peel and the Lower East Side's Have a Marijuana, Nico's The Marble Index, The Moray Eels Eat The Holy Modal Rounders and the label sampler album Begin Here.) Houghton wrote that the album's collage and free form material "deterred most listeners", while Stoughton recalled that many reviewers found the experimental tracks to be challenging, having expected a more traditional release from Elektra, adding: "Not surprisingly, people with conservative tastes disliked the extreme tracks, and people with extreme tastes were puzzled by the inclusion of conservative tracks", noting that Frank Zappa only enjoyed "Horatio & Julie" and suggested that Stoughton release an album of pure musique concrète.

Billboard made Transformer a "Special Merit Pick" and wrote that it was an "exceptional album" with Stoughton's "baroque and renaissance-flavor pop music", guitar and vocals, adding: "Each side contains only three cuts, but what imaginative, well-performed material it contains in these cuts". A reviewer for American Record Guide noted that the album exemplifies the "attractive idea" of writing a set of songs, arranging the musicians to perform them, and then recording a tape, which they deemed preferable to "holding a group of musicians together for long periods of time, finding work for them, and so on". They considered Transformer to be an unusual rock album and highlighted the instrumental playing for being "consistently interesting" and gelling into "effective wholes", as well as the "remarkably" clear recording and imaginative stereo effects, concluding that while the record was not perfect, it was "one of the most interesting and beautiful I have heard in quite some time. Adventurous listeners will want to hear it for themselves." Rolling Stone wrote that "The Anecdote of Horatio & Julie" was too inaccessible for listeners who were not on an acid trip.

== Legacy ==
Transformer was ultimately Stoughton's only album, and according to Houghton, remains unpopular outside of what the musician calls "a small but dogged core of [online] music lovers who are interested in the extreme music of the '60s". Houghton writes that Elektra had released several one-off experimental albums in 1968, such as Nico's The Marble Index and the Holy Modal Rounders' The Moray Eels Eat the Holy Modal Rounders, but that "in terms of sheer unclassifiable weirdness, Transformer wins the prize." In 2006, "The Sun Comes Up Each Day" appeared on the compilation Forever Changing: The Golden Age of Elektra 1963-1973. David Cavanagh praised the inclusion of Stoughton alongside other obscure names like Alasdair Clayre and the Waphple, deeming it "serious archivist stuff", and described his song as "eerie toytown whimsy." In their piece on Elektra, Record Collector deemed Stoughton to be one of several "true originals" on the label and described Transformer as "one of the most unique and forward-looking albums ever released by Elektra, ranging from modernistic rock to what can only be described as musique concrète."

In 2010, Mojo included Transformer in their list "Break on Through! The 60 Greatest Elektra Albums". In 2011, Uncut ranked it at number 23 their list of the 50 greatest "lost albums"; John Mulvey wrote that it had never been released on CD and vinyl copies were becoming rarer, but noted that it was due for digital re-release in mid-2011 to commemorate Elektra's 60th anniversary. In 2017, Uncut ranked the record at number 71 in their list of the "101 Weirdest Albums of All Time"; contributor Jim Wirth wrote that the record made Tim Buckley's "pretty extreme" Starsailor (1970) seem like "James Taylor-linear", writing that Stoughton's musical fusion "set Transformer's co-ordinates straight for the cut-out bins." Wirth also described "Horatio & Julie" as a "rambling post-rock opera" and a "[particularly] demented one-off." The 2015 re-release of Probe 10's There Is a Universe (1975) was marketed as being similar to an Elektra album, citing Transformer and Buckley's Starsailor; in his review for Record Collector, Mick Houghton wrote that "Stoughton's unclassifiable oddity isn't a bad call, particularly the operatic singing on the title track."

== Track listing ==
All songs written by David Stoughton.

=== Side one ===
1. "The Sun Comes Up Each Day" – 3:59
2. "The Summer Had No Breeze" – 5:10
3. "The Anecdote of Horatio & Julie" – 8:00

=== Side two ===
4. "Saving for a Rainy Day" – 4:51
5. "Evening Song" – 4:25
6. "I Don't Know If It's You" – 10:00

== Personnel ==
Adapted from the liner notes of Transformer.

Musicians

- David Stoughton – lyrics, music, concept, production, guitar, vocals ("Saving for a Rainy Day", "Evening Song", "I Don't Know If It's You")
- Mal MacKenzie – bass
- Joe Livolsi – drums
- John Nicholls – vocals ("The Sun Comes Up Each Day", "The Summer Had No Breeze", "The Anecdote of Horatio & Julie")
- Steve Tanzer – flute, piccolo flute
- Peter Chapman – horns

Additional personnel

- Jac Holzman – recording supervisor
- Bob Petrucci – engineering
- Marshall Goldberg – engineering
- Peter Granet – engineering
- William S. Harvey – art direction
- Myron Collins – photography
- Robert L. Heimall – design
