= David Stoughton =

American experimental musician

- Origin: Boston, United States
- Genres: Folk; musique concrète
- Occupations: Musician, record producer
- Years active: 1960s
- Label: Elektra Records
- Formerly of: The Cambridge Electric Opera Company

David Stoughton is an American musician, known for his only album, the cult album and Elektra Records release Transformer (1968), recorded with his group the Cambridge Electric Opera Company.

== Life ==
As an undergraduate at Harvard University, Stoughton "became caught up in the folk boom" and learned different folk guitar styles including "bluegrass, blues, fingerpicking and flatpicking styles", and frequented Club 47 where many famous folk artists played including Joan Baez, the Charles River Valley Boys and Doc Watson. He began teaching guitar at the Newton School of Music, and his views on music were changed by the Beatles and John Cage. John Lennon of the Beatles inspired him to write "Beatle-ish" songs on a Stratocaster, while Cage's influence helped nurture his musique concrète compositions, both of which were later hallmarks of his material.

Stoughton had formed The Cambridge Electric Opera Company, who mixed electronic and traditional-based idioms. Newsweek grouped the Opera Company in with the Bosstown Sound, an anti-drug, anti-hippy music scene in Boston based around students, noting that Stoughton was a Harvard student and Lee Mason of the Bagatelle studied at New York. The newspaper wrote: "Like the San Francisco sound, the Bosstown Sound is more apparent in diversity than homogeneity. Such groups as Phluph, The Cambridge Electric Opera Co. and One are insistently experimental. In his book Astral Weeks: A Secret History of 1968, Ryan H. Walsh noted that the Opera Company were one of several bands "forming practically overnight" in the period of the Newsweek article, which was influential in Boston.

Transformer had been intended as an Opera Company album but was released under Stoughton's name to avoid confusion with Earth Opera. Record Collector described the album as "one of the most unique and forward-looking albums ever released by Elektra". Uncut included the album in their 2010 list of the "50 greatest lost albums". The album has also been referenced by experimental group White Out.

The Arts Desk described Stoughton as a "lost" Elektra signee with peers in Tim Buckley and Love. AllMusic describe him as being similar to singer-songwriter Marc Jonson, whose album Years (1972) has drawn comparison to Stoughton. A 1969 correspondence between Stoughton and his influence John Cage is archived by the Northwestern University Library.

== Discography ==
=== Albums ===
- Transformer (1968)

=== Singles ===
- "The Sun Comes Up Each Day" (1969)
