= A Morning Raga/An Evening Raga =

Studio album by Ravi Shankar
- Released: 1968
- Genre: Hindustani classical music
- Length: 47:51
- Labels: World Pacific Records (Original U.S. and Canadian releases)

A Morning Raga/An Evening Raga is a 1968 LP by Hindustani classical musician Ravi Shankar. It was originally released under the alternative title Raga Nata Bhairav · Raga Mishra Piloo in the U.K., but had the simplified title for its original U.S. and Canadian releases, as well as most subsequent re-releases. It was also released as Ravi Shankar in India in 1970. A digitally remastered version was released in CD format through Angel Records.

The record features two North Indian ragas; Nata Bhairav, which is a morning raga created by Shankar in the mid-1960s by combining aspects of the ragas Nat and Bhairav, and Mishra Piloo, which is a popular evening raga. The original liner notes feature detailed descriptions of each raga's melodic and structural content.

== Track listing ==
1. "Raga Nata Bhairav" – 23:18
2. "Raga Mishra Piloo" – 24:32

== Personnel ==
- Ravi Shankar – sitar
- Alla Rakha – tabla
- Kamala Chakravarti – tanpura
- Prodyot Sen – bass tanpura
