= Old Golden Throat =

Compilation album by Johnny Cash
- Released: June 1968
- Recorded: August 8, 1958–January 12, 1967
- Genres: Country; folk
- Length: 34:12
- Label: CBS
- Producers: Don Law, Frank Jones

Johnny Cash chronology
At Folsom Prison (1968)	Old Golden Throat (1968)	Heart of Cash (1968)

Professional ratings
Review scores
Source	Rating
Allmusic	3/5 stars

Old Golden Throat is the 28th album by country singer Johnny Cash. It was released in 1968 and is a collection of mostly previously released songs. Nine of the fourteen tracks had previously appeared on Billboard's country singles chart.

== Track listing ==
No.	Title	Writer(s)	Single	Length
1.	"I Got Stripes"	Cash, Charlie Williams	A-Side (1959)	2:05
2.	"A Certain Kinda Hurtin'"	Cash	"The Sons of Katie Elder" B-Side (1965)	2:03
3.	"Little at a Time"	Cash, Gordon Terry	"In the Jailhouse" B-Side (1962)	1:57
4.	"All Over Again"	Cash	A-Side (1958)	2:12
5.	"Still in Town"	Harlan Howard, Hank Cochran	"The Matador" B-Side (1963)	2:36
6.	"Smiling Bill McCall"	Cash	"Seasons of My Heart" B-Side (1960)	2:07
7.	"The Wind Changes"	Cash	"Red Velvet" B-Side (1967)	2:49
8.	"The Sons of Katie Elder"	Ernie Sheldon, Elmer Bernstein	A-Side (1965)	2:35
9.	"Dark as a Dungeon"	Merle Travis	"Understand Your Man" B-Side (1964)	2:29
10.	"Tennessee Flat Top Box"	Cash	A-Side (1961)	3:01
11.	"The Matador"	Cash, June Carter	A-Side (1963)	2:48
12.	"Send a Picture of Mother"	Cash	"Busted" B-Side (1962)	2:53
13.	"You Dreamer You"	Cash	"Frankie's Man Johnny" B-Side (1959)	1:49
14.	"Red Velvet"	Ian Tyson	A-Side (1967)	2:48
Total length:				34:12

== Personnel ==
- Johnny Cash - vocals, guitar
- Luther Perkins, Jack Clement, Johnny Western, Carl Perkins, Norman Blake - guitar
- Bob Johnson - lute, mandocello, guitar
- Marshall Grant - bass
- Buddy Harman, W.S. Holland - drums
- Don Helms - steel guitar
- Shot Jackson - steel guitar, Dobro
- Marvin Hughes, Floyd Cramer, Bill Pursell - piano
- Charlie McCoy - harmonica
- Gordon Terry - fiddle
- Maybelle Carter - harpsichord
- Karl Garvin, Bill McElhiney - trumpet
- Lew DeWitt - whistle
- The Anita Kerr Singers, The Carter Family, The Statler Brothers - backing vocals

== Charts ==
Singles – Billboard (United States)

Year	Single	Chart	Position
1967	"The Wind Changes"	Country Singles	60
1965	"The Sons of Katie Elder"	Country Singles	10
1964	"Dark as a Dungeon"	Country Singles	49
1963	"The Matador"	Country Singles	2
1961	"Tennessee Flat-Top Box"	Country Singles	11
1960	"Smiling Bill McCall"	Country Singles	13
1959	"You Dreamer You"	Country Singles	13
1959	"I Got Stripes"	Country Singles	4
1958	"All Over Again"	Country Singles	4

== See also ==
- More of Old Golden Throat
