= 1968 in heavy metal music =

This is a timeline documenting the events of heavy metal in the year 1968.

== Bands formed ==
- Accept (as Band X)
- Alice Cooper
- Black Sabbath (as Earth)
- Breakout
- Deep Purple
- Edgar Broughton Band
- Free
- Grand Funk Railroad
- Humble Pie
- Led Zeppelin
- Meat Loaf
- Nazareth
- Rush (as The Projection)
- Sir Lord Baltimore
- Sweet
- Warpig
- Writing on the Wall

== Bands disbanded ==
- Cream

== Songs ==
- "Born to Be Wild" by Steppenwolf
- "Voodoo Child" by The Jimi Hendrix Experience
- "Helter Skelter" by The Beatles
- "In-A-Gadda-Da-Vida" by Iron Butterfly
- "Race With the Devil" by The Gun
- "Summertime Blues" by Blue Cheer

== Albums ==
=== January ===
Day	Artist	Album
16	Blue Cheer	Vincebus Eruptum
22	Iron Butterfly	Heavy
29	Steppenwolf	Steppenwolf
30	The Velvet Underground	White Light/White Heat

=== February ===
Day	Artist	Album
	Vanilla Fudge	The Beat Goes On

=== June ===
Day	Artist	Album
14	Cream	Wheels of Fire
14	Iron Butterfly	In-A-Gadda-Da-Vida
14	Vanilla Fudge	Renaissance
	The Crazy World of Arthur Brown	The Crazy World of Arthur Brown

=== July ===
Day	Artist	Album
17	Deep Purple	Shades of Deep Purple
29	The Jeff Beck Group	Truth

=== August ===
Day	Artist	Album
	Blue Cheer	Outsideinside

=== October ===
Day	Artist	Album
16	Jimi Hendrix Experience	Electric Ladyland
	Steppenwolf	The Second

=== November ===
Day	Artist	Album
22	The Kinks	The Kinks Are the Village Green Preservation Society

=== December ===
Day	Artist	Album
20	Pretty Things	S.F. Sorrow
	Deep Purple	The Book of Taliesyn
