= Africa '68 =

Studio album by Hugh Masekela
- Released: 1968
- Recorded: probably New York c. 1966 and Los Angeles c. late 1967.
- Genre: Jazz
- Length: 26:49
- Label: Uni Records 73028
- Producer: Stewart Levine, Hugh Masekela

Hugh Masekela chronology
| The Promise of a Future (1967) | Africa '68 (1968) | The Lasting Impression of Hugh Masekela (1969) |

Professional ratings
Review scores
| Source | Rating |
|---|---|
| The Encyclopedia of Popular Music | 3/5 stars |

Africa '68 is a studio album by South African jazz musician Hugh Masekela released in 1968 via Uni Records label. It was probably recorded in New York circa 1966 and Los Angeles circa late 1967.

== Track listing ==
| No. | Title | Writer(s) | Length |
|---|---|---|---|
| 1. | "Uyaz' Gabisa" | Caiphus Semenya | 3:15 |
| 2. | "Noyana" | Jonas Gwangwa, Caiphus Semenya | 2:45 |
| 3. | "Pretoria" | Philemon Hou | 2:07 |
| 4. | "Joala" | Ernest Mohlami, Caiphus Semenya | 2:00 |
| 5. | "Aredze" | Caiphus Semenya | 2:35 |
| 6. | "Kedumetse" | Caiphus Semenya | 2:52 |
| 7. | "Umoya" | Miriam Makeba | 2:08 |
| 8. | "Thokozile" | Philemon Hou | 2:52 |
| 9. | "Bopedi" | Hugh Masekela, Ernest Mohlomi | 6:15 |

== Personnel ==
- Hugh Masekela – trumpet, vocals
- Bruce Langhorne – guitar
- John Cartwright – bass
- Momsie Gwangwa
- Ernest Moholmi
- Paul Makgoba
- Philemon Hou
- Jonas Gwangwa
- Caiphus Semenya
- Letta Mbulu – vocals

This is the probable list of credits. The exact performers are unknown.
