= The Promise of a Future =

Studio album by Hugh Masekela
- Released: 1968
- Recorded: 12–14 March 1968
- Studio: Gold Star (Hollywood, California)
- Genre: Jazz
- Length: 29:57
- Label: Uni Records 73028
- Producer: Stewart Levine

Hugh Masekela chronology
Hugh Masekela Is Alive and Well at the Whisky (1967)	The Promise of a Future (1968)	Africa '68 (1968)

Professional ratings
Review scores
Source	Rating
AllMusic	3/5 stars
The Encyclopedia of Popular Music	3/5 stars

The Promise of a Future is the eighth studio album by South African jazz musician Hugh Masekela released via Uni Records label. It was recorded in March 1968 in Los Angeles, California. The album was re-released on CD in 1993 on One Way label. The Promise of a Future features Masekela's version of a famous instrumental composition "Grazing in the Grass".

== Reception ==
A reviewer of Dusty Groove stated: "Classic work from Hugh Masekela – and the album that pushed him over the top! The record features his version of 'Grazin In The Grass', a runaway instrumental hit when it was issued – and a sly little groover that was based upon some earlier South African pop melodies that Hugh copped from his roots. The group's a tight little quintet with Al Abreu on tenor and soprano sax, William Henderson on piano, Chuck Carter on drums, and Henry Franklin on bass." A reviewer of Billboard added: "Fluent in any musical lingo, Masekela and his crowd should sample all the charts before settling down."

== Track listing ==
No.	Title	Writer(s)	Length
1.	"Ain't No Mountain High Enough"	Nick Ashford, Valerie Simpson	2:00
2.	"Madonna"	Al Abreu	3:10
3.	"No Face, No Name and No Number"	Jim Capaldi, Steve Winwood	3:26
4.	"Almost Seedless"	Hugh Masekela	3:36
5.	"Stop"	Jerry Ragovoy, Mort Shuman	2:35
6.	"Grazing in the Grass"	Philemon Hou	2:40
7.	"Vuca" (Wake Up)	Hugh Masekela	3:40
8.	"Bajabula Bonke" (The Healing Song)	Miriam Makeba	6:25
9.	"There Are Seeds To Sow" (Guitar – Bruce Langhorne)	Hugh Masekela	2:25

== Personnel ==
- Bass – Henry Franklin
- Drums – Chuck Carter
- Guitar – Bruce Langhorne
- Engineer – The Doctor
- Piano – William Henderson
- Producer – Stewart Levine
- Saxophone (tenor, soprano) – Al Abreu
- Trumpet (uncredited) – Hugh Masekela
