= The Matador (Johnny Cash song) =

Single by Johnny Cash

from the album Old Golden Throat
- B-side: "Still in Town"
- Released: September 1963
- Recorded: 1963
- Genre: Country
- Length: 2:48
- Label: Columbia
- Songwriters: Johnny Cash, June Carter Cash
- Producers: Don Law, Frank Jones

Johnny Cash singles chronology
"Ring of Fire" (1963)	"The Matador" (1963)	"Understand Your Man" (1964)

"The Matador" is a song co-written and recorded by American country music artist Johnny Cash. The song was written by Cash and his wife, June Carter Cash. It was later included on the album Old Golden Throat; along with the b-side "Still in Town". It was released in September 1963. Cash Box described it as "a medium-paced, chorus-backed Latin-styled romancer with a contagious repeating riff throughout."

== Chart performance ==
The single peaked at number two on the country charts. "The Matador" also crossed over to the Hot 100, peaking at number 44.

Chart (1963)	Peak position
US Hot Country Songs (Billboard)	2
US Billboard Hot 100	44
