= The O'Kaysions =

American pop band

The O'Kaysions are an American pop band from Kenly, North Carolina that first formed in 1959. They are best known for their 1968 million-seller "Girl Watcher".

== Career ==
The group first formed under the name The Kays in 1959, and scored a Top 10 hit in the U.S. in 1968 with the tune "Girl Watcher" (#5 Pop, #6 R&B). The song was first released on the North State record label owned by Ronald Killette (Buck Trail), then based in Goldsboro, N.C., under the production of John I Whitfield. Authorship credit for the song was originally shared by Buck Trail and O'Kaysions band member Wayne Pittman. Due to the popularity of this single it was sold to and released nationally by ABC Records where it eventually reached #5 on the Billboard pop charts. "Girl Watcher" received gold record status for a million sales from the R.I.A.A. in December 1968. It was their only major hit, and they released their full-length album in 1969 entitled The O'Kaysions on the ABC label. In 1987, the song was reworked as "I'm A Wheel Watcher" and was used to promote the TV game show, Wheel of Fortune (as well as its French-Canadian and New Zealand versions). This reworked version was performed by Kool & the Gang.

As the song was recorded at Pitt Sound Studio, Greenville, North Carolina, a budget studio, the master tape was long thought to be missing, a story dismissed by original member Wayne Pittman who believes that ABC Records took possession of the master and still maintains it. Others have claimed that a needle-drop of The North State single was used by ABC to create the nationally released hit single. That "master" is now the property of MCA Records and is leased to other record labels. The group still receives royalties from MCA.

The group still performed with a different line-up as of 2020. Wayne Pittman was the only original member. He died at the age of 76 on July 7, 2021 in Irmo, South Carolina. In November 2003, the original line-up, with the exception of Pittman, reunited for a one-time show at the Alabama Theater in Myrtle Beach, South Carolina, where they received a CBMA Hall of Fame Award.

== Original band members ==
- Donnie Weaver - vocals, organ
- Wayne Pittman - guitar
- Eddie Dement - trumpet
- Gerald Toler - saxophone
- Jimmy Hinnant - bass
- Steve Watson - drums

== Discography ==
=== Singles ===
Year	Title	Peak chart positions		Record Label	B-side	Album
Year	Title	US	R&B	Record Label	B-side	Album
1968	"Girl Watcher"	—	—	North State Records	"Deal Me In"	
1968	"Girl Watcher"	5	6	ABC Records	"Deal Me In"	Girl Watcher
1968	"Love Machine"	76	—	ABC Records	"Dedicated to the One I Love"	Girl Watcher
1969	"Twenty Four Hours from Tulsa"	—	—	ABC Records	"Colors"	
1970	"Watch Out Girl"	—	—	Cotillion Records	"Happiness"	
1971	"Life and Things"	—	—	Cotillion Records	"Travelin' Life"	

=== Albums ===
Year	Album	Billboard 200	R&B	Record label
1968	Girl Watcher	153	49	ABC Records
