= The Sons of Katie Elder (song) =

Single by Johnny Cash

from the album The Sons of Katie Elder (Music from the Score of the Paramount Picture) and Old Golden Throat
- A-side: "The Sons of Katie Elder" "A Certain Kinda Hurtin'"
- Released: July 1965
- Genre: country
- Label: Columbia 4-43342
- Composer: Elmer Bernstein
- Lyricist: Ernie Sheldon
- Producer: Don Law

Audio
- "The Sons of Katie Elder" on YouTube

"The Sons of Katie Elder" is the theme song for the 1965 Paramount western of the same name starring John Wayne. It was written by Ernie Sheldon (words) and Elmer Bernstein (music).

The song, as recorded by Johnny Cash, wasn't used in the actual film, but appeared on its soundtrack LP. Released as a single by Columbia Records (Columbia 4-43342, with "A Certain Kinda Hurtin'" on the opposite side), in July 1965, the song became a U.S. country top-10 hit.

== Background ==
According to the book Johnny Cash FAQ: All That's Left to Know About the Man in Black, the song used "virtually the same music and arrangement" as a song titled "Thunderball" that Johnny Cash had recorded as a potential title song for the James Bond movie of the same name during the sessions for the double album Johnny Cash Sings the Ballads of the True West. Cash's version of the song was rejected in favor of Tom Jones' one, and

A month later, Cash went back into the studio and, using virtually the same music and arrangement as he had on the unreleased Bond track, recorded the theme for the John Wayne movie The Sons of Katie Elder. This time, the song was a much better fit for the film, and the producers agreed.

Cash and his band might have used the same instrumental track just so as not to let a good arrangement go to waste. Or it might have been because Cash was in no shape to be creative.

The book The Man in Song: A Discographic Biography of Johnny Cash tells a slightly different story:

An additional track recorded during the sessions for Ballads of the True West was "The Sons of Katie Elder," a song that was recorded for the John Wayne movie of the same name, and which appears on the soundtrack album of the Paramount motion picture, but was not included in the actual movie soundtrack. It tells the story of four brothers who were raised by the gun by their mother, Katie Elder. It's a warning to avoid the outlaw lifestyle and "to not live by a gun, and to not live like the sons of Katie Elder." Cash turns in a highly believable performance on a song that was released as a single and made it to number 10 on the country chart in 1965.

== Track listing ==
7" single (Columbia 4-43342, 1965)
No.	Title	Writer(s)	Length
1.	"The Sons of Katie Elder"	Ernie Sheldon, Elmer Bernstein	2:32
2.	"A Certain Kinda Hurtin'"	Johnny Cash	2:00

== Charts ==
Chart (1965)	Peak position
US Hot Country Songs (Billboard)	10
US Bubbling Under Hot 100 (Billboard)	119

== Personnel ==
Cash recorded the song on June 11, 1965, at the Columbia Studio in Nashville, Tessessee.

- Johnny Cash – vocals, guitar
- The Statler Brothers: Lew DeWitt, Don Reid, Harold Reid, Phil Balsley; The Carter Family: Maybelle, Anita, Helen, June – vocal harmonies
- Luther Perkins – electric guitar
- Marshall Grant – bass guitar
- W.S. 'Fluke' Holland – drums
- Unknown – French horns
- Unknown – timpani
- Bill McElhiney – Arranger & Conductor
- Don Law and Frank Jones – Producers
