= Gentle On My Mind and Other Originals =

Compilation album by John Hartford
- Released: 1968
- Studio: RCA Studio A (Nashville, Tennessee)
- Genre: Folk, country
- Length: 26:21
- Label: RCA Victor
- Producer: Felton Jarvis

Professional ratings
Review scores
Source	Rating
AllMusic	4.5/5 stars
The Encyclopedia of Popular Music	3/5 stars

Gentle On My Mind and Other Originals is an album by folk, country and bluegrass musician and songwriter John Hartford. It was released by RCA Victor in 1968.

The album was recorded in RCA's "Nashville Sound" studio in Nashville, Tennessee.

== Critical reception ==
Billboard praised the album, calling Hartford one of the era's "great songwriters."

== Track listing ==
All songs written by John Hartford.

Side 1

1. "California Earthquake" – 3:00
2. "Gentle on My Mind" – 3:00
3. "Natural to Be Gone" – 1:46
4. "The Six O'Clock Train and a Girl with Green Eyes" – 2:38
5. "A Simple Thing As Love" – 2:54

Side 2

1. "Mouth to Mouth Resuscitation" – 1:50
2. "I Would Not Be Here" – 2:19
3. "Front Porch" – 1:56
4. "Untangle Your Mind" – 2:02
5. "Like Unto a Mockingbird" – 2:46
6. "The Tall Tall Grass" – 2:20

== Personnel ==
- John Hartford – banjo, guitar, fiddle, vocals

== Production ==
- Felton Jarvis – producer
- Jim Malloy – recording engineer
- Al Pachucki – recording engineer
- Cam Mullins – arranger, Tracks 4 and 5 on Side 1
