= Ken Ford (violinist) =

American violinist (born 1968)

- Born: November 14, 1968; St. Louis, Missouri
- Genres: Jazz, classical, R&B
- Occupations: Musician, composer, record producer
- Instrument: Violin
- Website: kenford.net

Ken Ford (born November 14, 1968) is an American jazz violinist. He began his career as a classical violinist, but he has recorded with musicians in R&B, neo soul, and contemporary jazz.

== Early years ==
Born in St. Louis, Ken Ford lived in Detroit, Michigan, before his parents moved with their only child to make their permanent home in Atlanta, Georgia. With his father as a DJ, he grew up surrounded by the sounds of jazz, blues, and R&B from Earth, Wind & Fire to Al Green and more. After trying numerous instruments, at the age of nine he settled on the violin. In his Atlanta school years, he trained classically on the violin, with training from members of the Atlanta Symphony Orchestra, and he became a founding member of the DeKalb Youth Pops Orchestra. Ford also joined the African American Philharmonic Orchestra (AAPO), working his way up to Concert Master. While playing with the AAPO, he performed for Barry White. Growing up hearing different genres, Ford followed his father's footsteps for a time as a DJ and counts Stevie Wonder and violinists Noel Pointer and Jean-Luc Ponty among his musical influences. At his mother's urging to pursue education with a backup career plan, he completed a degree in Computer Information Systems. He became a fixture on Atlanta's music scene and his renown grew. He decided to pursue music full-time after himself unemployed in the middle 1990s.

== Career ==
He recorded with Bruno Mars, Chaka Khan, Ledisi, Lalah Hathaway, Wyclef Jean, Maxwell, and Cee Lo Green. His albums include Burnt Toast (2001), Chevelle Lane (2003), Right Now (2009), and State of Mind (2011).

Ford is a supporter of music education. He hosts benefits and meets with youth while touring to educate them on music appreciation. In July 2010 he created the Ken Ford Foundation to support arts and music in children's education and to discourage notions about the violin as a boring instrument fit only for classical music. He was scheduled to perform in An Evening of Respect, a tribute to Otis Redding, in Macon, Georgia, in September 2011.

== Discography ==
- 2001 Burnt Toast (KF Productions BMI)
- 2003 Chevelle Lane (KF Productions BMI)
- 2009 Right Now (Ken Ford, Inc. & Sojo Music, Inc)
- 2011 State of Mind (Twelve Music Group)
