= Spontaneous Combustion (American band) =

American music group

Spontaneous Combustion was an American music group founded in 1986. They performed what they called "bluerock", a bluegrass/rock music fusion. The band consisted of Roger Eilts (guitar, vocals), Leo Eilts (bass, vocals), Scott Prowell (mandolin, banjo, dobro, vocals) and Marvin Gruenbaum (violin, vocals). They were often billed as The Spontaneous Combustion Bluegrass Band or when they performed with former members of Total Strangers as Spontaneous Combustion/Total Strangers. They were a popular act at the Santa Fe Trails Bluegrass Festival and the Walnut Valley Festival. Spontaneous Combustion performed for 21 seasons with the four founding members before disbanding in 2006.

== Discography and songs ==
Their albums included BlueRock, Spontane, Where There's Smoke, Live Embers and Strike Anywhere. Their bluegrass covers of songs like "I Heard It Through the Grapevine", "I Can See For Miles" and the theme song for "Secret Agent Man" are still popular on college radio stations in the American South (for example Nashville Public Radio 7 Mar 2009).
