= The Siegel–Schwall Band (1971 album) =

Studio album / Live album by Siegel–Schwall Band
- Released: 1971
- Recorded: 1971
- Genre: Blues-rock
- Label: Wooden Nickel
- Producer: Bill Traut; Peter Szillies

Siegel–Schwall Band chronology
Siegel–Schwall '70 (1970)	The Siegel–Schwall Band (1971)	Sleepy Hollow (1972)

Professional ratings
Review scores
Source	Rating
AllMusic	2.5/5 stars

The Siegel–Schwall Band is an album by the blues-rock group the Siegel–Schwall Band. Released in 1971, it was their fifth album, and their first to be released by Wooden Nickel Records. It is not to be confused with the band's 1966 debut album, which is also titled The Siegel-Schwall Band.

The Siegel–Schwall Band won the 1973 Grammy Award for Best Album Cover. The cover was illustrated by Harvey Dinnerstein, with art direction by Acy R. Lehman.

== Track listing ==
Side one:

1. "(Wish I Was on a) Country Road" (Jim Post, Corky Siegel) – 3:19 (Note: Recorded live at The Quiet Knight, Chicago, Illinois)
2. "Devil" (Siegel) – 5:10 (Note: Recorded at RCA's Mid-America Recording Center, Chicago, Illinois)
3. "Leavin'" (Jim Schwall) – 3:10
4. "Corrina" (Traditional) – 6:05

Side two:

1. "I Won't Hold My Breath" (Siegel) – 4:01
2. "Next to You" (Schwall) – 4:20
3. "Hush Hush" (Jimmy Reed) – 11:06

== Personnel ==
=== Siegel-Schwall Band ===
- Corky Siegel – piano, harmonica, vocals
- Jim Schwall – guitar, vocals
- Rollo Radford – bass, vocals
- Shelly Plotkin – drums

=== Production ===
- Produced by Bill Traut and Peter Szillies
- Engineers: John Janus, Roger Anfinsen, Joe Lopes, Gary Taylor, Randy Kling
- Mixing: Martin Feldman
- Photography: Colin Johnson
- Artwork: Harvey Dinnerstein
- Art direction: Acy Lehman
