= The Siegel–Schwall Reunion Concert =

Live album by Siegel–Schwall Band
- Released: 1988
- Recorded: 1987
- Genre: Blues
- Length: 53:43
- Label: Alligator
- Producer: Corky Siegel; Jim Schwall; Bruce Iglauer

Siegel–Schwall Band chronology
R.I.P. Siegel/Schwall (1974)	The Siegel–Schwall Reunion Concert (1988)	Flash Forward (2005)

Professional ratings
Review scores
Source	Rating
Allmusic	2/5 stars
The Penguin Guide to Blues Recordings	2.5/4 stars

The Siegel–Schwall Reunion Concert is an album by the Siegel–Schwall Band. It was recorded live in 1987, and released by Alligator Records in 1988.

The Siegel–Schwall Band formed in Chicago in 1964. After a few years of playing locally, they became a national touring act, and stayed together until 1974, releasing ten albums. In 1987, they got back together and performed a reunion concert at the Vic Theatre in Chicago. The concert was broadcast live on radio station WXRT-FM. The Siegel–Schwall Reunion Concert consists of selections from that concert.

Since the reunion concert, the Siegel–Schwall Band has performed live on an occasional basis. In 2005 they released a new album of all original material called Flash Forward.

== Track listing ==
1. "You Don't Love Me Like That" (Jim Schwall) – 4:03
2. "Devil" (Corky Siegel) – 5:27
3. "Leavin'" (Schwall) – 3:10
4. "Hey, Billie Jean" (Jim Post, Siegel) – 6:24
5. "I Wanna Love Ya" (Rollo Radford) – 4:09
6. "I Think It Was the Wine" (Schwall) – 4:55
7. "I Don't Want You to Be My Girl" (Siegel) – 6:55
8. "When I've Been Drinkin'" (Big Bill Broonzy, Schwall) – 4:14
9. "Hush, Hush" (Jimmy Reed) – 7:22
10. "Got My Mojo Working" (Preston Foster) – 4:30

== Personnel ==
=== The Siegel–Schwall Band ===
- Corky Siegel – harmonica, piano; vocals on "Devil", "Hey, Billie Jean", "I Don't Want You to be My Girl", "Hush, Hush"
- Jim Schwall – guitar; vocals on "You Don't Love Me Like That", "Leavin'", "I Think It Was the Wine", "When I've Been Drinkin'"
- Rollo Radford – bass; vocals on "I Wanna Love Ya"
- Sam Lay – drums; vocals on "Got My Mojo Working"

=== Additional musicians ===
- Alejo Poveda – percussion on "Hey, Billie Jean"

=== Production ===
- Produced by Corky Siegel, Jim Schwall, and Bruce Iglauer
- Recorded by Mark Harder and Timothy R. Powell
- Recording assistance by Andras Szanto
- Mixed by Jay Shilliday and Tim Hale
- Live sound mixed by Kenn Gorz
- Cover design and photos by Peter Amft (son of Robert Amft)
- Hand lettering by Craig Havighurst
- Mastered by Tom Coyne
- Liner notes by Lin Brehmer
- Special thanks to Seth Mason
