= Siegel–Schwall '70 =

Studio album by Siegel–Schwall Band
- Released: 1970
- Studio: Paragon Recording Studios, Chicago, Illinois
- Genre: Blues-rock
- Label: Vanguard
- Producer: Bill Traut

Siegel–Schwall Band chronology
Shake! (1968)	Siegel–Schwall '70 (1970)	The Siegel–Schwall Band (1971)

Professional ratings
Review scores
Source	Rating
AllMusic	2.5/5 stars

Siegel–Schwall '70 is an album by the blues-rock group the Siegel–Schwall Band. Released in 1970, it was their fourth album, and their last one for Vanguard Records. Produced as a vinyl LP, it was later re-released as a CD, also on the Vanguard label.

Siegel–Schwall '70 was the band's first record to feature their early 1970s lineup of Corky Siegel on piano and harmonica, Jim Schwall on guitar, Rollo Radford on bass, and Shelly Plotkin on drums.

The album was recorded at Paragon Recording Studios in Chicago, except for the last song on each side — "Angel Food Cake" and "A Sunshine Day in My Mind" — which were recorded live at the Quiet Knight in Chicago.

== Track listing ==
Side one:

1. "I Don't Want You to Be My Girl" (Corky Siegel) – 6:20
2. "Do You Remember" (Siegel, Jim Schwall) – 2:55
3. "Geronimo" (Schwall, Charles de Meyer) – 3:04
4. "Angel Food Cake" (Siegel) – 5:28

Side two:

1. "Walk in My Mind" (Siegel) – 2:32
2. "Song" (Siegel) – 4:20
3. "Tell Me" (Chester Burnett) – 3:47
4. "A Sunshine Day in My Mind" (Schwall, Jim Post) – 8:00

== Personnel ==
=== Siegel–Schwall Band ===
- Corky Siegel – piano, electric piano, harmonica, vocals
- Jim Schwall – guitar, vocals
- Rollo Radford – electric bass, upright bass
- Shelly Plotkin – drums

=== Production ===
- Producer: Bill Traut
- Production assistants: Jim Schwall, Corky Siegel, Peter Szillies
- Recording supervisors: Marty Feldman, Mal Davis
- Design: Jules Halfant
- Photography: Todd Cazaux
