= Sleepy Hollow (album) =

Studio album by Siegel–Schwall Band
- Released: 1972
- Studio: Paragon Recording Studios, Chicago, Illinois
- Genre: Blues rock
- Length: 39:50
- Label: Wooden Nickel
- Producer: Siegel–Schwall Band

Siegel–Schwall Band chronology
The Siegel–Schwall Band (1971)	Sleepy Hollow (1972)	953 West (1973)

Sleepy Hollow is an album by American electric blues band Siegel–Schwall Band. Their second album on the Wooden Nickel Records label, and their sixth album overall, it was recorded at Paragon Recording Studios in Chicago. It was released on vinyl in 1972. It was re-released as a CD by Wounded Bird Records in 1999.

== Critical reception ==
Professional ratings
Review scores
Source	Rating
Allmusic	2.5/5 stars

Billboard wrote, "Though blues-fed, the elements involving the music of the Siegel–Schwall band are decidedly rock; the sound is exciting. Best cuts: 'Something's Wrong', 'Hey, Billie Jean', and 'His Good Time Band' is fairly good. Dealers: This group has a solid music reputation and a large fan-following among serious rock devotees."

Writing retrospectively in Billboard in 2000, Jim Bessman said that Sleepy Hollow "showed the increasing experimentation within the blues format that would mark the band's final few years — though Siegel–Schwall continues to reunite periodically for concert appearances... But the most telling track of the set was Siegel's 'His Good Time Band'. The tribute to an exemplary musician who just didn't care to compete commercially, but was content enough to sit back and play his music solely for the love of it, surely spoke for Siegel–Schwall — which in the late '60s and early '70s virtually owned the Midwest, yet disbanded at the height of its popularity to pursue other interests."

== Track listing ==
Side one:

1. "I Wanna Love Ya" (Rollo Radford) – 4:05
2. "Somethin's Wrong" (Corky Siegel) – 4:08
3. "Sleepy Hollow" (Siegel) – 3:30
4. "Blues for a Lady" (Jim Schwall) – 8:32

Side two:

1. "His Good Time Band" (Siegel) – 3:57
2. "You Don't Love Me Like That" (Schwall) – 3:28
3. "Sick to My Stomach" (Schwall) – 2:19
4. "Always Thinkin' of You, Darlin'" (Siegel) – 3:15
5. "Hey, Billie Jean" (Jim Post, Siegel) – 6:10

== Personnel ==
=== Siegel–Schwall Band ===
- Corky Siegel – piano, harmonica, vocals
- Jim Schwall – guitar, vocals
- Rollo Radford – bass, vocals
- Shelly Plotkin – drums

=== Production ===
- Siegel–Schwall Band – producer
- Bill Traut – supervision
- Barry Mraz – recording
