= Live: The Last Summer =

Live album by Siegel–Schwall Band
- Released: 1974
- Recorded: 1973
- Genre: Blues-rock
- Length: 40:08
- Label: Wooden Nickel
- Producer: Siegel–Schwall Band; Barry Mraz; Bill Traut

Siegel–Schwall Band chronology
Three Pieces for Blues Band and Symphony Orchestra (1973)	Live: The Last Summer (1974)	R.I.P. Siegel/Schwall (1974)

Professional ratings
Review scores
Source	Rating
Allmusic	3/5 stars

Live: The Last Summer is an album by the blues-rock group the Siegel–Schwall Band. Their ninth album, it was recorded live in the summer of 1973 at the Brewery in Lansing, Michigan and at the Quiet Knight in Chicago, Illinois. It was released as a vinyl LP by Wooden Nickel Records in 1974. It was re-released as a CD by Wounded Bird Records in 1999. The album is also known as The Last Summer.

== Track listing ==
Side one:

1. "Rock Me Baby" (B.B. King, Joe Josea) – 5:25
2. "You Don't Love Me Like That" (Jim Schwall) – 3:45
3. "I Won't Hold My Breath" (Corky Siegel) – 4:16
4. "Sun is Shining" (Jimmy Reed) – 6:10
5. "Let's Boogie" (Ken Goerres) – 0:05

Side two:

1. "Hey, Billie Jean" (Jim Post, Siegel) – 7:26
2. "West Coast Blues" (Schwall) – 5:20
3. "Out-a-Gas?" (Siegel) – 7:20

== Personnel ==
=== Siegel–Schwall Band ===
- Corky Siegel – piano, harmonica, vocals
- Jim Schwall – guitar, vocals
- Rollo Radford – bass, vocals
- Shelly Plotkin – drums, percussion

=== Production ===
- Produced by the Siegel-Schwall Band, Barry Mraz, and Bill Traut
- Engineer: Barry Mraz
- Sound: Ken Goerres
- Remote recording: Chuck Buchanan
- Mastering: Arnie Acosta
- Cover art: John Thompson
- Art direction: Acy Lehman
- Liner photography: Colin Johnson, Nick Sangiamo
