= The Siegel–Schwall Band (1966 album) =

Studio album by Siegel–Schwall Band
- Released: 1966
- Recorded: 1966
- Genre: Blues
- Label: Vanguard
- Producer: Samuel Charters

Siegel–Schwall Band chronology
The Siegel–Schwall Band (1966)	Say Siegel–Schwall (1967)

Professional ratings
Review scores
Source	Rating
Allmusic	3/5 stars

The Siegel–Schwall Band is the first album by the Chicago-based blues-rock group the Siegel–Schwall Band. It was released by Vanguard Records in 1966. It is not to be confused with the band's fifth album, which is also titled The Siegel–Schwall Band.

The Siegel–Schwall Band was produced by Samuel Charters. It is the band's only album with their original bass player, Jos Davidson. Before joining the Siegel-Schwall Band, Davidson was the bassist in Steve Miller's band the Ardells. After leaving Siegel–Schwall, Davidson played with another Chicago blues artist, pianist Otis Spann.

== Track listing ==
Side one:

1. "Down in the Bottom" (Chester Burnett) – 2:24
2. "I Have Had All I Can Take" (Corky Siegel) – 3:13
3. "Boot Hill" ("Jimmy Witherspoon", actually by 'Sly Williams' [possibly Cleo Page]) – 2:54
4. "When I Get the Time" (Jos Davidson) – 2:59
5. "I've Got to Go Now" (Siegel) – 2:46
6. "Mama/Papa" (Jim Schwall) – 1:37
7. "I'll Be the Man" (Siegel) – 2:38

Side two:

1. "Little Babe" (Burnett) – 2:46
2. "Going to New York" (Jimmy Reed) – 3:21
3. "Mary" (Siegel) – 2:04
4. "So Glad You're Mine" (Arthur Crudup) – 3:41
5. "Hoochie Coochie Man" (Willie Dixon) – 6:46
6. "Break Song" (Siegel, Schwall, Davidson, Russ Chadwick) – 2:20

== Personnel ==
=== The Siegel-Schwall Band ===
- Corky Siegel – piano, harmonica, vocals
- Jim Schwall – guitar, vocals
- Jos Davidson – bass, vocals
- Russ Chadwick – drums

=== Production ===
- Samuel Charters – producer
