= 953 West =

Studio album by Siegel–Schwall Band
- Released: 1973
- Studios: Paragon Recording Studios, Chicago, Illinois
- Genre: Blues rock
- Length: 40:10
- Label: Wooden Nickel
- Producers: Siegel–Schwall Band, Barry Mraz

Siegel–Schwall Band chronology
Sleepy Hollow (1972)	953 West (1973)	Three Pieces for Blues Band and Symphony Orchestra (1973)

Professional ratings
Review scores
Source	Rating
Allmusic	2.5/5 stars

953 West is an album by the Siegel–Schwall Band. Their third album on the Wooden Nickel Records label, and their seventh album overall, it was recorded at Paragon Recording Studios in Chicago in August 1973, and was released later that year. It was re-released as a CD, by Wounded Bird Records, in 1999.

The title of the album refers to the Quiet Knight, a music venue where the Siegel–Schwall Band performed many times, which was located at 953 West Belmont Avenue in Chicago. The album cover art depicts the platform of the nearby Belmont 'L' station.

== Track listing ==
Side one

1. "I'd Like to Spend Some Time Alone with You Tonight My Friend" (Corky Siegel)) – 4:12
2. "Traitor from Decatur" (Patrick Garvey) – 2:54
3. "Good Woman" (Shelly Plotkin) – 4:10
4. "Just Another Song About the Country Sung by a City Boy" (Danny Glicken, Siegel) – 5:23
5. "When I've Been Drinkin'" (Big Bill Broonzy, with additional lyrics by Jim Schwall) – 4:06

Side two

1. "Old Time Shimmy" (Rollo Radford) – 3:54
2. "Off to Denver" (Siegel) – 3:13
3. "I Think It Was the Wine" (Schwall) – 3:50
4. "Reed Zone (Psychiatric Institution Blues)" (Siegel) – 5:59
5. "Blow Out the Candle" (Schwall) – 2:25

== Personnel ==
=== Siegel–Schwall Band ===
- Corky Siegel – piano, harmonica, vocals
- Jim Schwall – guitar, vocals
- Rollo Radford – bass, vocals
- Shelly Plotkin – drums, percussion

=== Production ===
- Siegel–Schwall Band – producer
- Barry Mraz – producer, engineer
- Bill Traut – supervision
- Eddie Balchowsky – cover art and poem
