= Shake! (album) =

Studio album by Siegel–Schwall Band
- Released: 1968
- Studio: Vanguard Studios, 23rd Street, New York City
- Genre: Blues-rock
- Label: Vanguard
- Producer: Samuel Charters

Siegel–Schwall Band chronology
Say Siegel–Schwall (1967)	Shake! (1968)	Siegel–Schwall '70 (1970)

Shake! is an album by the blues-rock group the Siegel–Schwall Band. Their third album, it was released in 1968 by Vanguard Records as a vinyl LP. It was later re-released as a CD, also on the Vanguard label.

Shake! was the group's last album to feature Jack Dawson on bass guitar and Russ Chadwick on drums.

== Critical reception ==
Professional ratings
Review scores
Source	Rating
Allmusic	3/5 stars
Rolling Stone	(neutral)

On Allmusic, Cub Koda wrote, "Shake! was probably the group's second best album and certainly the one that came the closest to representing their live act.... Lots of fun and fireworks on this one, the sound of a band at the top of their game."

== Track listing ==
Side one:

1. "Shake For Me" (Willie Dixon) – 4:46
2. "My Starter Won't Start" (Lightnin' Hopkins) – 4:46
3. "Jim Jam" (Jim Schwall) – 2:22
4. "Louise, Louise Blues" (J. Mayo Williams, Johnny Temple) – 2:45
5. "Wouldn't Quit You" (Corky Siegel) – 2:07

Side two:

1. "You Can't Run That Fast" (Schwall) – 3:00
2. "Think" (Siegel) – 2:36
3. "334-3599" (Schwall) – 2:31
4. "Rain Falling Down" (Schwall) – 2:37
5. "Get Away Man" (Siegel) – 3:08
6. "Yes I Love You" (Siegel) – 2:49

== Personnel ==
Siegel–Schwall Band

- Corky Siegel – harmonica, piano, vocals
- Jim Schwall – guitar, vocals
- Jack Dawson – bass
- Russ Chadwick – drums

Production

- Samuel Charters – producer
- Dave Holtz - design
- Merk Roth - photography
