= 15th Annual Grammy Awards =

1973 US music awards ceremony

- Date: March 3, 1973
- Location: Tennessee Theatre, Nashville, Tennessee
- Hosted by: Andy Williams
- Most awards: Georg Solti (4)
- Most nominations: Georg Solti (4)

Television/radio coverage
- Network: CBS

The 15th Annual Grammy Awards were held on March 3, 1973, at the Tennessee Theatre in Nashville, Tennessee. The event was the first Grammy ceremony not to be held in either New York City or Los Angeles (the 64th Grammys, staged in Las Vegas in 2022, would be the second). The 15th Grammys were also the first to be broadcast live on CBS, who would carry every Grammy telecast through 2026.

== Performers ==
Artist(s)	Song(s)
Mike Curb Congregation	Medley
Loggins & Messina	"Your Mama Don't Dance"
Charley Pride	"Kiss An Angel Good Mornin'"
The Staple Singers	"I'll Take You There"
Donna Fargo	"Happiest Girl in the Whole USA"
Mac Davis	"Baby, Don't Get Hooked on Me"
Helen Reddy	"I Am Woman"
Andy Williams	Medley of Song of the Year nominees: "Alone Again (Naturally)" "Song Sung Blue" "The First Time Ever I Saw Your Face" "American Pie" "The Summer Knows"
Curtis Mayfield	"Freddie's Dead"
Don McLean	"Vincent"
Gilbert O'Sullivan	"Alone Again (Naturally)"

== Presenters ==
- The 5th Dimension - Best New Artist
- Loretta Lynn & Eddy Arnold - Best Male Country Vocal Performance
- Johnny Mann & Moms Mabley - Best R&B by a Duo or Group
- Roger Miller & Bobbie Gentry - Best Country Performance Female
- David Clayton Thomas & Aretha Franklin - Best Pop Vocal Performance Male
- Joey Heatherton & Rod McKuen - Best Pop Vocal Performance Female
- Andy Williams - Song of the Year
- Harry Nilsson & Ringo Starr - Best R&B Vocal Performance Male
- Johnny Mathis & Dusty Springfield - Album of the Year
- Art Garfunkel - Record of the Year

== Award winners ==
- Record of the Year
  - Joel Dorn (producer) & Roberta Flack for "The First Time Ever I Saw Your Face" performed by Roberta Flack
- Album of the Year
  - George Harrison (producer & artist), Phil Spector (producer), Eric Clapton, Bob Dylan, Billy Preston, Leon Russell, Ravi Shankar, Ringo Starr & Klaus Voormann for The Concert for Bangladesh
- Song of the Year
  - Ewan MacColl (songwriter) for "The First Time Ever I Saw Your Face" performed by Roberta Flack
- Best New Artist
  - America

=== Children's ===
- Best Recording for Children
  - Christopher Cerf, Lee Chamberlin, Joe Raposo (producers), Bill Cosby & Rita Moreno for The Electric Company

=== Classical ===
- Best Classical Performance - Orchestra
  - Georg Solti (conductor) & the Chicago Symphony Orchestra for Mahler: Symphony No. 7 in E Minor
- Best Classical Vocal Soloist Performance
  - Dietrich Fischer-Dieskau for Brahms: Die Schöne Magelone
- Best Opera Recording
  - Erik Smith (producer), Colin Davis (conductor) the BBC Symphony Orchestra & various artists for Berlioz: Benvenuto Cellini
- Best Choral Performance, Classical (other than opera)
  - Georg Solti (conductor), the Vienna Boys' Choir, the Vienna Singverein Chorus, the Vienna State Opera Chorus, the Chicago Symphony Orchestra & various artists for Mahler: Symphony No. 8 in E Flat (Symphony of a Thousand)
- Best Classical Performance - Instrumental Soloist or Soloists (with orchestra)
  - Eugene Ormandy (conductor), Arthur Rubinstein & the Philadelphia Orchestra for Brahms: Piano Concerto No. 2 in B Flat
- Best Classical Performance - Instrumental Soloist or Soloists (without orchestra)
  - Vladimir Horowitz for Horowitz Plays Chopin
- Best Chamber Music Performance
  - Julian Bream & John Christopher Williams for Julian and John (Works by Lawes, Carulli, Albéniz, Granados)
- Best Classical Album
  - David Harvey (producer), Georg Solti (conductor), various artists, the Vienna Boys' Choir, the Vienna Singverein Chorus & the Chicago Symphony Orchestra for Mahler: Symphony No. 8 in E Flat (Symphony of a Thousand)

=== Comedy ===
- Best Comedy Recording
  - George Carlin for FM & AM

=== Composing and arranging ===
- Best Instrumental Composition
  - Michel Legrand (composer) for "Brian's Song"
- Best Original Score Written for a Motion Picture or a Television Special
  - Nino Rota (composer) for The Godfather
- Best Instrumental Arrangement
  - Don Ellis (arranger) for "Theme From The French Connection" performed by the Don Ellis Big Band
- Best Arrangement Accompanying Vocalist(s)
  - Michel Legrand (arranger) for "What Are You Doing the Rest of Your Life?" performed by Sarah Vaughan

=== Country ===
- Best Country Vocal Performance, Female
  - Donna Fargo for "Happiest Girl in the Whole USA"
- Best Country Vocal Performance, Male
  - Charley Pride for Charley Pride Sings Heart Songs
- Best Country Vocal Performance by a Duo or Group
  - The Statler Brothers for "Class of '57"
- Best Country Instrumental Performance
  - Charlie McCoy for Charlie McCoy/The Real McCoy
- Best Country Song
  - Ben Peters (songwriter) for "Kiss an Angel Good Mornin'" performed by Charley Pride

=== Folk ===
- Best Ethnic or Traditional Recording (including traditional blues)
  - Muddy Waters for The London Muddy Waters Sessions

=== Gospel ===
- Best Gospel Performance
  - The Blackwood Brothers for L-O-V-E
- Best Soul Gospel Performance
  - Aretha Franklin for Amazing Grace
- Best Inspirational Performance
  - Elvis Presley for He Touched Me

=== Jazz ===
- Best Jazz Performance by a Soloist
  - Gary Burton for Alone at Last
- Best Best Jazz Performance by a Group
  - Freddie Hubbard for First Light
- Best Jazz Performance by a Big Band
  - Duke Ellington for Togo Brava Suite

=== Musical show ===
- Best Score From an Original Cast Show Album
  - Micki Grant (composer), Jerry Ragovoy (producer) & the original cast (Alex Bradford, Hope Clarke & Bobby Hill) for Don't Bother Me, I Can't Cope

=== Packaging and notes ===
- Best Album Cover
  - Acy R. Lehman (art director) & Harvey Dinnerstein (graphic artist) for The Siegel–Schwall Band performed by the Siegel–Schwall Band
- Best Album Notes
  - Tom T. Hall for Tom T. Hall's Greatest Hits
- Best Album Notes - Classical
  - James Lyons (notes writer) for Vaughan Williams: Symphony No. 2 (A London Symphony) conducted by André Previn

=== Pop ===
- Best Pop Vocal Performance, Female
  - Helen Reddy for "I am Woman"
- Best Pop Vocal Performance, Male
  - Harry Nilsson for "Without You"
- Best Pop Vocal Performance by a Duo, Group or Chorus
  - Donny Hathaway & Roberta Flack for "Where Is the Love"
- Best Pop Instrumental Performance by an Instrumental Performer
  - Billy Preston for "Outa-Space"
- Best Pop Instrumental Performance with Vocal Coloring
  - Isaac Hayes for Black Moses

=== Production and engineering ===
- Best Engineered Recording, Non-Classical
  - Armin Steiner (engineer) for Moods performed by Neil Diamond
- Best Engineered Recording, Classical
  - Gordon Parry, Kenneth Wilkinson (engineers) Georg Solti (conductor) & the Chicago Symphony Orchestra for Mahler: Symphony No. 8 (Symphony of a Thousand)

=== R&B ===
- Best R&B Vocal Performance, Female
  - Aretha Franklin for Young, Gifted and Black
- Best R&B Vocal Performance, Male
  - Billy Paul for "Me and Mrs. Jones"
- Best R&B Vocal Performance by a Duo, Group or Chorus
  - The Temptations for "Papa Was a Rollin' Stone"
- Best R&B Instrumental Performance
  - Paul Riser & Norman Whitfield (The Temptations) for "Papa Was a Rollin' Stone (Instrumental)"
- Best R&B Song
  - Barrett Strong & Norman Whitfield (songwriters) for "Papa Was a Rollin' Stone" performed by The Temptations

=== Spoken ===
- Best Spoken Word Recording
  - Bruce Botnick (producer) for Lenny performed by the original cast
