= Flash Forward (album) =

Studio album by Siegel–Schwall Band
- Released: August 16, 2005
- Genre: Blues
- Length: 54:26
- Label: Alligator
- Producer: Corky Siegel; Holly Siegel

Siegel–Schwall Band chronology
The Siegel–Schwall Reunion Concert (1988)	Flash Forward (2005)

Professional ratings
Review scores
Source	Rating
Allmusic	3.5/5 stars
PopMatters	3/10 stars
Modern Guitars	(favorable)
Maximum Ink	(favorable)
George Graham	(favorable)
The Penguin Guide to Blues Recordings	2.5/4 stars

Flash Forward is an album by the Siegel–Schwall Band. Released by Alligator Records in 2005, it was the second album recorded by the band after they re-formed in 1987, and their first studio album since R.I.P. Siegel/Schwall in 1974.

Flash Forward contains thirteen original songs, with multiple songs written by each of the four members of the band – Corky Siegel, Jim Schwall, Rollo Radford, and Sam Lay. It reached number 9 on the Billboard blues album chart.

== Track listing ==
1. "Afraid of Love" (Corky Siegel) – 4:42
2. "Deja Vous" (Siegel) – 4:24
3. "Going Back to Alabama" (Sam Lay) – 3:40
4. "The Underqualified Blues" (Jim Schwall) – 5:29
5. "Krazy" (Rollo Radford) – 4:40
6. "Can't Stop" (Siegel) – 4:38
7. "On the Road" (Schwall) – 3:38
8. "Twisted" (Siegel) – 3:49
9. "Rumors of Long Tall Sally" (Lay) – 3:05
10. "Hey Leviticus" (Schwall) – 2:42
11. "Sweet Liz" (Lay) – 3:34
12. "Pauline" (Radford) – 6:02
13. "Stormy Weather Love" (Lay) – 3:55

== Personnel ==
=== Siegel–Schwall Band ===
- Corky Siegel – harmonica, piano, vocals
- Jim Schwall – guitar, mandolin, twelve-string guitar, accordion, vocals
- Rollo Radford – electric bass, upright bass, vocals
- Sam Lay – drums, vocals; guitar on "Stormy Weather Love"

=== Additional musicians ===
- Marcy Levy – background vocals

=== Production ===
- Corky Siegel – producer, engineer, liner notes
- Holly Siegel – producer
- Ken Goerries – co-producer, mixing, additional recording
- Bruce Iglauer – additional mixing
- Mitch Zelezny – mastering
- Paul Natkin – photos
- Kevin Niemiec – packaging design
- Michael Trossman – Alligator logo
