= The Ardells =

Name of several musical groups

Several bands have called themselves The Ardells.

== Steve Miller's band ==
The Ardells was a band started by Steve Miller in 1961 when he attended the University of Wisconsin–Madison. In the fall of 1962, Steve lived in a rooming house in Madison and also pledged the Chi Psi fraternity on fraternity row near Langdon St. Steve taught another fellow student, Jos Davidson, to play rhythm guitar and then bass, and formed a campus band: Steve Miller and the Ardells. Steve was featured on guitar, vocals and harp, and played a version of Texas shuffle blues that hadn't been heard in the upper Midwest. Also featured in the band were a local 16-year-old high school piano player named Brian Friedman, and Ron Boyer, a drummer who worked a day job as a manager in a local Kelly's Hamburger drive-in. The band played mostly the University party circuit, plus a few gigs in Madison and local clubs and a couple of concerts and the Dane County Fairgrounds. Later, Davidson joined Corky Siegel and Jim Schwall and was the bassist for the Siegel-Schwall Band from 1964 to 1967.

Later, at the end of the 62-63 school year, Steve left Madison and came down to Chicago. There, Steve (vocals, guitar, bass) was accompanied by Boz Scaggs (rhythm guitar, vocals), Michael Krusing (lead guitar, bass), Denny Berg (vocals, guitar, bass), Ron Boyer (drums), Ben Sidran (keyboards). The group performed at local clubs in Chicago's Old Town and burgeoning blues scene through 1965 and covered a variety of song styles from the 1950s and 1960s, including Texas blues, rhythm & blues and solid rock 'n' roll. Three part vocal harmony by Miller, Scaggs and Berg was their trademark. With Scaggs, Miller went on to form the Steve Miller Band, which Sidran was occasionally a part of.

After two albums, Scaggs went on to have a successful solo career and is still touring today. Sidran eventually settled down in Madison, becoming a professor at the University of Wisconsin–Madison. He is also well regarded as a prominent music historian and has recorded numerous solo albums. Micheal Krusing settled down to have a family and Ron Boyer runs The Village Green bar and tavern in Middleton, WI along with his wife and children..

== Florida band ==
The Ardells was a band from West Palm Beach, Florida that had been together since 1959: Bill Ande, Tom Condra, Vic Gray, and Dave Hieronymus. They were originally The R-Dells (aka Ardells). In 1964, their manager —Bob Yorey— changed their name to The American Beetles as a joke, and they toured in South America, then changed names again to The Razor's Edge in 1966 and had a hit with "Let's Call It a Day Girl" on Pow! Records.
