= Say Siegel–Schwall =

Studio album by Siegel–Schwall Band
- Released: 1967
- Studio: Vanguard Studios, New York City
- Genre: Blues-rock
- Label: Vanguard
- Producer: Samuel Charters

Siegel–Schwall Band chronology
The Siegel–Schwall Band (1966)	Say Siegel–Schwall (1967)	Shake! (1968)

Say Siegel–Schwall is an album by the blues-rock group the Siegel–Schwall Band. Their second album, it was released in 1967 by Vanguard Records as a vinyl LP. It was later re-released as a CD, also on the Vanguard label.

Say Siegel–Schwall was the first of two albums by the band to feature Jack Dawson on bass guitar. It was dedicated to Jos Davidson, the previous bassist.

== Critical reception ==
Professional ratings
Review scores
Source	Rating
Allmusic	4/5 stars

On Allmusic, Cub Coda wrote, "For all parties concerned, this was the group's breakthrough album.... Some of it rocks, some of it boogies, some of it's downright creepy and eerie. Worth seeking out."

== Track listing ==
Side one:

1. "I'm a King Bee" (Slim Harpo) – 5:29
2. "Slow Blues in A" (Jim Schwall) – 5:25
3. "You Don't Love Me" (Schwall) – 2:44
4. "I.S.P.I. Blues" (Corky Siegel) – 9:51

Side two:

1. "Bring It With You When You Come" (traditional; arranged by Schwall) – 4:15
2. "My Baby Thinks I Don't Love Her" (Siegel) – 4:34
3. "That's Why I Treat My Baby So Fine" (Siegel) – 11:18
4. "I Liked It Where We Walked" (Siegel) – 2:56

== Personnel ==
=== Siegel–Schwall Band ===
- Corky Siegel – harmonica, piano, vocals
- Jim Schwall – guitar, mandolin, vocals
- Jack Dawson – bass
- Russ Chadwick – drums

=== Production ===
- Samuel Charters – producer
- Jules Halfant – design
- Joel Brodsky – photography
