= Flashforward (disambiguation) =

A flashforward is a narrative device. Flashforward or Flash Forward may also refer to:

- FlashForward, a 2009 American TV series
- Flash Forward (album), a 2005 album by the Siegel-Schwall Band
- Flashforward (novel), a 1999 novel by Robert J. Sawyer and the basis for the 2009 series
- Flash Forward, a 1996 Disney Channel TV series
