= Three Pieces for Orchestra =

Three Pieces for Orchestra may refer to:

- Three Pieces for Orchestra (Berg)
- Drei Sätze für Orchester, part of Bruckner's Four Orchestral Pieces

== See also ==
- Three Pieces for Blues Band and Symphony Orchestra, a 1968 avant-garde musical composition by William Russo
