= Cleo Page =

American blues musician

- Born: Cleo Mallard; May 25, 1928 near Robeline, Natchitoches Parish, Louisiana, United States
- Died: February 19, 1979 (aged 50) Inglewood, California, United States
- Genre: Blues
- Occupations: Guitarist, singer, songwriter
- Instrument: Guitar
- Years active: 1955–1979
- Labels: Various including Federal, P-Vine and JSP

Cleo Page (May 25, 1928 – February 19, 1979) was an American blues guitarist, singer, songwriter, and producer whose recorded work was released on several singles and an album in his lifetime, with a compilation album issued in 2022. Details of his life are sketchy, and he has been a subject of conjecture among blues historians.

== Biography ==
He was born Cleo Mallard near Robeline, Natchitoches Parish, Louisiana, United States. Little is known of his early life, but he relocated to the South Central section of Watts in Los Angeles at age 14 with the help of his older cousin.

His musical career appears to have commenced in 1955 when, in the June of that year, Federal Records released a single credited to the C. Page Orchestra with Ernest Johns. It had "Aline" written by Page as the A-side. In September the same year, Aladdin Records issued a single with the accreditation given to Rolling Crew with Orchestra, with Page writing and singing on the A-side "Home On Alcatraz". "If You Ever Get Lonesome" was co-written by Johnny Otis and Page and recorded by Preston Love and His Orchestra (with vocals by Roy "Happy" Easter) and released in December 1955.

In 1956, Page and Otis co-penned the track "Bad Bad Bulldog", which appeared on the B-side of a single credited to 'Little Arthur Matthews Featured with Johnny Otis Orchestra'. Around the same time another Page penned track, "I've Been Blind, Blind, Blind", was recorded by the singer Robert McKirby, although it remained unreleased for many years. It finally appeared on the 1992 compilation album, Dapper Cats, Groovy Tunes & Hot Guitars (Ace Records).

In 1957, a single credited to Curley Page and Band, was released on Dalton Records. The A-side was the instrumental track, "East Imperial". In 1963, the Hollywood-based budget LP label Sutton released Stormy Monday and other Blues by Jimmy Witherspoon which included the tracks "I Believed in a Woman" and "Boot Hill" and presumably credited to a mysterious musician named "Sly Williams." It is the latter release that has been the subject of continued debate and speculation over the identity of 'Sly Williams.' (see 'Conjecture' section below).

In 1970, Page reappeared playing guitar on a one-off single, "Boo Bam" / "Pages of Time", credited to Pages of Time. It was released by CB Records. Later that year, the two-part composition "Black Man (Too Tough To Die)" appeared on Wonder Records. It was credited to Page, and Page's humorous comments were balanced throughout with lyrics sprinkled with curses and threats. The single's label explained that it was recorded by 'Black Man Power in the heart of the ghetto "Watts" California'. By this time, Page had become the owner and operator of the small Goodie Train and Las Vegas labels. His next single was issued in 1972. "Goodie Train - Part One", again credited to Cleo Page alone, was released on Goodie Train Records. This was followed the same year by "Leaving Mississippi" on Las Vegas Records.

In parallel with his own activities, he wrote and produced a single with the songs "Big Man" / "Old Man Me" on Goodie Train Records in 1972, for the obscure soul singer Frank Hutton. For added confusion, the vinyl was first released with the lead singer's name incorrectly listed as Frank Hutson. Page also produced and recorded other local rhythm and blues and gospel musicians for his Goodie Train and Las Vegas labels, releasing more than 20 singles and an LP throughout the 1970s.

After "Leaving Mississippi," he did not record again under his own name until 1978 when the risqué worded and double entendre loaded, "Hamburger (All Americans Eat It)" by Cleo Page was issued on Goodie Train Records, and differently billed as "I Love to Eat It - Hamburger" on JSP Records (January 1979). The song was written by Page, who provided both vocals and electric guitar playing and produced the single. In 1979, JSP Records released his album, Leaving Mississippi. Jim DeKoster in Living Blues described the collection as "one of the most striking blues albums of the past year". For an unknown reason, "Hamburger" was not included on the album's track listing. The album, consisting mainly of Page original compositions, was reissued on CD in 2007 by P-Vine Records.

Page died at Daniel Freeman Hospital, Inglewood, California, on February 19, 1979, at the age of 50.

In 2022, the compilation album, Black Man - Too Tough to Die, was released by ADS Records.

== Conjecture ==
The two mysterious tracks that appeared on the 1963 Sutton LP Stormy Monday and Other Blues by Jimmy Witherspoon, "I Believed in a Woman" and "Boot Hill", that originally caught the attention of many blues fans and historians, were obviously not recorded by Witherspoon. Confusingly, although the LP cover read 'Stormy Monday and Other Blues by Jimmy Witherspoon,' it also listed in very small type the names Mel Williams, Baby Moses, and Sly Williams. Neither the front nor back cover of the album, nor the record's label, specified who recorded which track. Presumably, "Boot Hill" and "I Believed in a Woman" were by Sly Williams. Blues historians have argued various viewpoints, primarily that 'Sly Williams' may be Cleo Page, whilst others stated that the artist was aurally similar to Clarence Samuels, and others postulated that 'Sly Williams' was probably Jesse Allen. Still others have suggested it may have been Pete "Guitar" Lewis, Jimmy Nolen, or Lafayette Thomas. The mystery was finally solved in 2017 when a previously unknown original 45 r.p.m. of "I Believed in a Woman / Boot Hill" on Dalton from 1958 surfaced on an online auction and proved it was Cleo Page who was the original composer and recording artist.

"Boot Hill"'s significance grew in importance in the following decades to become akin to a blues standard. In 1966, a version of the track was included on Siegel–Schwall Band's eponymous debut album, although the songwriting credit was erroneously listed to Jimmy Witherspoon. In 1984, the song appeared on Johnny Winter's LP Guitar Slinger (Alligator Records), where no songwriting credit was listed; and in 1991 it opened the posthumously released compilation album. The Sky Is Crying (EPC Records) by Stevie Ray Vaughan. In the latter's case, the songwriter is listed as 'Unknown'.

== Discography ==
=== Albums ===
Year	Title	Record label
1979	Leaving Mississippi	JSP Records / P-Vine Records
2022	Black Man - Too Tough to Die	ADS Records

=== Singles ===
Year	Title	Credit	Record label
1955	"Aline / A Long, Long Time"	C. Page Orchestra with Ernest Johns	Federal Records
1957	"East Imperial / Curley Rock"	Curley Page and Band	Dalton Records
1958	"I Believed in a Woman / Boot Hill"	Curley Page and Band	Dalton Records
1970	"Black Man - Part One (Too Tough to Die)"	Cleo Page	Wonder Records
1971	"Goodie Train - Part One"	Cleo Page	Goodie Train Records
1972	"Leaving Mississippi / You Know You Wrong"	Cleo Page	Las Vegas Records
1978	"Hamburger (All Americans Eat It)"	Cleo Page	Goodie Train Records
1979	"I Love to Eat It - Hamburger"	Cleo Page	JSP Records
