= R.I.P. Siegel/Schwall =

Studio album by Siegel–Schwall Band
- Released: 1974
- Recorded: 1974
- Genre: Blues-rock
- Length: 39:09
- Label: Wooden Nickel
- Producer: Siegel–Schwall Band; Barry Mraz; Bill Traut

Siegel–Schwall Band chronology
Live: The Last Summer (1974)	R.I.P. Siegel/Schwall (1974)	The Siegel–Schwall Reunion Concert (1988)

R.I.P. Siegel/Schwall is an album by the blues-rock group the Siegel–Schwall Band. It was recorded at Paragon Recording Studios in Chicago. It was released as a vinyl LP by Wooden Nickel Records in 1974. It was re-released as a CD by Wounded Bird Records in 1999.

According to the liner notes, several months after the Siegel–Schwall Band disbanded in February 1974, their record company asked them to record one more album. The result was R.I.P. Siegel/Schwall. All of the songs on the album are cover versions. The band did not release another album of newly recorded material until 14 years later with The Siegel–Schwall Reunion Concert.

== Critical reception ==
Professional ratings
Review scores
Source	Rating
Allmusic	4/5 stars

On Allmusic, Mike DeGagne wrote, "With their bountiful, down-on-the-farm blues sound led by Corky Siegel's harmonica, R.I.P. became an excellent sendoff for one of the most enjoyable groups ever to play this style of blues music. Most of the cuts belong to the band's favorite musicians and songwriters, but are wonderfully molded in the SSB's traditional style of rollicking piano riffs and greasy mandolin.... Every one of the Siegel–Schwall Band's albums have something to offer, but they really outdid themselves on R.I.P., their farewell album."

== Track listing ==
Side one:

1. "Take Out Some Insurance" (Charles Singleton, Wadense Hall) – 3:19
2. "Pretty Good" (John Prine) – 2:53
3. "(I) Can't Believe You Wanna Leave" (Leo Price, Richard Penniman) – 2:54
4. "Wild About My Lovin'" (traditional) – 4:07
5. "Night Time's the Right Time" (Nappy Brown, Ozzie Cadena, Lew Herman) – 4:52

Side two:

1. "I'm a Hog for You Baby" (Jerry Leiber, Mike Stoller) – 4:38
2. "Tell Me Mama" (Walter Jacobs) – 1:52
3. "You Don't Have to Go" (Jimmy Reed) – 3:31
4. "Long Distance Call" (McKinley Morganfield) – 4:51
5. "It's Too Short" (W. R. Calaway, Clarence Williams) – 2:46
6. "Women Make a Fool out of Me" (Johnny Bond) – 3:20

== Personnel ==
=== Siegel–Schwall Band ===
- Corky Siegel – piano, harmonica, vocals
- Jim Schwall – guitar, mandolin, vocals
- Rollo Radford – bass, vocals
- Shelly Plotkin – drums, percussion

=== Production ===
- Siegel–Schwall Band – producer
- Barry Mraz – producer, recording, mixing
- Bill Traut – producer
- Harvey Dinnerstein – cover illustration
- Acy Lehman – art direction
- Craig DeCamps – liner design
