= Three Pieces for Blues Band and Symphony Orchestra =

Studio album by Siegel–Schwall Band
- Released: 1973
- Genres: Blues rock, third stream, classical crossover, avant-garde
- Label: Deutsche Grammophon
- Producer: Thomas Mowrey

Siegel–Schwall Band chronology
953 West (1973)	Three Pieces for Blues Band and Symphony Orchestra (1973)	Live: The Last Summer (1974)

Alternate cover
- 1977 Polydor Records release

Three Pieces for Blues Band and Symphony Orchestra is an avant-garde musical composition written by William Russo in 1968. It combines classical music played by an orchestra with blues played by a four-piece band.

Three Pieces for Blues Band and Symphony Orchestra was recorded in 1972 by the San Francisco Symphony and the Siegel–Schwall Band, conducted by Seiji Ozawa. When the album was released the following year by Deutsche Grammophon, it became one of the company's best selling records, reaching number 21 on the Billboard Jazz Chart and number 105 on the Billboard 200.

Conductor Jean-François Verdier recorded Three Pieces in 2021 and 2022 with Orchestre Victor Hugo de Franche Comté and French blues band Awek, releasing the recording in 2023.

== From concept to album release ==
In 1966, Seiji Ozawa saw the Siegel–Schwall Band perform live at Big John's in Chicago. The Siegel–Schwall Band was a blues rock group led by Corky Siegel (harmonica, piano, vocals) and Jim Schwall (guitar, vocals). Ozawa conceived the idea of combining blues and classical music. The following year, Ozawa conducted a performance of William Russo's Symphony No. 2, Titans, at the Ravinia Festival. Shortly after that, Russo was commissioned to write and orchestrate the composition that became Three Pieces for Blues Band and Symphony Orchestra. Russo consulted with Siegel when writing this work. While the orchestral parts are fully delineated, the blues band parts are more broadly outlined, leaving significant room for musical improvisation.

Three Pieces for Blues Band and Symphony Orchestra was first performed at the Ravinia Festival on July 7, 1968, by the Chicago Symphony Orchestra, conducted by Ozawa, and the Siegel–Schwall Band. It was subsequently performed by the Siegel–Schwall Band and several other orchestras around the United States, one of which was the San Francisco Symphony.

In 1972, the San Francisco Symphony was reunited with the Siegel–Schwall Band to record Three Pieces for the album.

== Street Music ==
Several years later, William Russo wrote another composition combining classical music and the blues, Street Music: A Blues Concerto. This piece was recorded by the San Francisco Symphony, again conducted by Seiji Ozawa, with Corky Siegel playing harmonica and electric piano. Street Music was released as an album in 1977 by Deutsche Grammophon, with a "B side" of George Gershwin's An American in Paris.

== Album and reissues ==
Side two of the original LP record was Symphonic Dances from West Side Story by Leonard Bernstein. Later in 1977, Three Pieces for Blues Band and Symphony Orchestra was re-released on vinyl by Deutsche Grammophon, on their Polydor Records label, backed by Street Music: A Blues Concerto.

In 2002, Three Pieces for Blues Band and Symphony Orchestra was released on CD, combined with Street Music and An American in Paris.

== Critical reception ==
Professional ratings
Review scores
Source	Rating
Allmusic	2/5 stars

On Classical Music Sentinel in 2011, Jean-Yves Duperron wrote, "This great collaborative recording from the 1970s deserves the term of Definitive Recording simply for being what it is. A very successful coming together of different genres of music that created an impact, that is still being felt today.... If you like blues music, Leonard Bernstein's Mass, even something a bit more remote like the Sketches of Spain by Miles Davis, you will love these pieces blending the upbeat sound of a blues band with a symphony orchestra. And if you love the sound of a well-played blues harmonica, just wait until you hear what Corky Siegel can achieve on that versatile instrument. It will make you love the blues all over again."

On Allmusic, Cub Koda was considerably more reserved, saying "This is not an album — or a piece of music — to be neutral about. Collaborations between the high brow and the low down have always been dicey... but this one will definitely leave [you] on one side of the debate or the other..."

== Track listing ==
=== Original LP ===
Side one:
Three Pieces for Blues Band and Symphony Orchestra (William Russo)
with the Siegel–Schwall Band; Stuart Canin – solo violin on "2nd Part"

1. "1st Part"
2. "2nd Part"
3. "3rd Part"

Side two:
Symphonic Dances from West Side Story (Leonard Bernstein)

1. "Prologue" (allegro moderato)
2. "Somewhere" (adagio)
3. "Scherzo" (vivace e leggiero)
4. "Mambo" (meno presto)
5. "Cha-Cha" (andantino con grazia)
6. "Meeting Scene" (meno mosso)
7. "Cool" Fugue (allegretto)
8. "Rumble" (molto allegro)
9. "Finale" (adagio)

=== Compact disc ===
Street Music: A Blues Concerto (William Russo)
with Corky Siegel

1. "1st Movement" – 8:16
2. "2nd Movement" – 5:17
3. "3rd Movement" – 8:52
4. "4th Movement" – 8:53

Three Pieces for Blues Band and Symphony Orchestra (William Russo)
with the Siegel–Schwall Band; Stuart Canin – solo violin on "2nd Part"

5. "1st Part" – 8:08
6. "2nd Part" – 8:58
7. "3rd Part" – 7:11

An American in Paris (George Gershwin)

8. "An American in Paris" – 18:03

== Personnel ==
- San Francisco Symphony Orchestra
- Seiji Ozawa – conductor

=== Siegel–Schwall Band ===
- Corky Siegel – harmonica, electric piano
- Jim Schwall – guitar
- Rollo Radford – bass
- Shelly Plotkin – drums

=== Production ===
- Thomas Mowrey – producer
- Jack Hunt – sound engineer
- Tom Scott – recording engineer
- Ken Caillat – recording engineer
- Terry Stark – recording engineer
