= Reach Out of the Darkness =

1967 single by Friend & Lover

Single by Friend & Lover

from the album Reach Out of the Darkness
- B-side: "Time on Your Side (You're Only 15 Years Old)"
- Released: October 1967
- Genre: Sunshine pop
- Length: 3:08
- Label: Verve Forecast
- Songwriter: Jim Post
- Producers: Bill Lowery; Joe South

Friend & Lover singles chronology
"A Town Called Love" (1967)	"Reach Out of the Darkness" (1967)	"If Love Is in Your Heart" (1968)

"Reach Out of the Darkness" is a song by American folk duo Friend & Lover from their debut studio album of the same name (1968). It was released as the lead single from the album in October 1967, by Verve Forecast Records. Jim Post is credited as the sole writer of the song, while production was helmed by Bill Lowery and Joe South. The song peaked at number 10 on the US Billboard Hot 100 and is Friend & Lover's only top 40 hit, which has often resulted in the duo being labeled as a one-hit wonder. In Canada the song reached number 6. The title never appears as such in the recording, though the nine mentions of "Reach Out in the Darkness" in the lyrics come close. The song is notable for its repeated opening line, "I think it's so groovy now that people are finally getting together." The song's follow-up, “If Love is in Your Heart”, stalled at number 86 a few months later, and reached number 54 in Canada.

== Production ==
The song was written and composed by James “Jim” Post, who together with his then-wife Catherine “Cathy” Post (nee Conn) comprised the duo Friend & Lover. Ray Stevens played keyboards and arranged the strings, with Joe South and Bill Lowery producing. The 1969 follow-up album, also titled Reach Out of the Darkness, was recorded in Atlanta and produced by Buddy Buie.

== In popular culture ==
The song was featured in the 1988 film 1969 and in the TV series Night Stalker (episode 6) and Beverly Hills, 90210: "The Time Has Come Today" (season 4, episode 25). The track was used in the closing scene and credits on the AMC series Mad Men: "A Man With a Plan" (season 6, episode 7). The scene in question was June 1968, when the news of Robert Kennedy's assassination was breaking on television, with characters watching the story unfold in stunned silence, some weeping. The song continued to play, superimposed over audio of the news reports from the assassination, during the closing credits. The song was also featured in the 2003 film Cheaper by the Dozen where it was played during the scene where the Baker family is making breakfast.

Krush sampled it for their song "Let's Get Together (So Groovy Now)," from the soundtrack to the comedy film Mo' Money, starring Damon Wayans and Stacey Dash.

In a concert in San Francisco's Golden Gate Park on 2 September 2007, as the city celebrated the 40th anniversary of the Summer of Love, Jim Post contradicted Unterberger's album sleeve notes when he claimed that, when he was in New York City, he wrote and composed the song (loosely corroborating the aforementioned Verve Records Discography) and that it became popular in San Francisco after a Selective Service sit-in there (there was a Selective Service Office protest in San Francisco on 16 October 1967), then went to the Midwest and the South, finally taking off in New York City corresponding to Martin Luther King's assassination in April 1968. However, an extensive search of music surveys currently available on-line shows instead that, depending on the survey, the song had no noticeable exposure until several weeks after that assassination, peaked anywhere from mid May to late July with none of the peaks attributable to any crisis, and in any event possessed essentially none of the claimed behavior. On New York's WABC Music Radio surveys, the song belatedly debuted at #50 the week of June 4, 1968 (the day before the assassination of Robert F. Kennedy), rose to #13 the following week and eventually peaked at #1 the week of July 23 before falling off rapidly.
