= Grammy Awards =

Award show for achievements in music

Grammy
- Previous: 68th Annual Grammy Awards; February 1, 2026; Next: 69th Annual Grammy Awards; February 7, 2027
- Awarded for: Outstanding achievements in the music industry
- Country: United States
- Presented by: The Recording Academy
- First award: May 4, 1959; 67 years ago
- Website: grammy.com

Television/radio coverage
- Network: NBC (1959–1970); ABC (1971–1972; 2027); CBS (1973–2026)

The Grammy Awards (stylized in all caps), and often referred to as the Grammys, are awards presented by the Recording Academy of the United States to recognize outstanding achievements in music. The trophy depicts a gilded gramophone, and the original idea was to call them the "Gramophone Awards".

The Grammys are the first major annual music awards broadcast on the Big Three networks and are considered one of the four major annual American entertainment awards with the Academy Awards (for films), the Emmy Awards (for television), and the Tony Awards (for Broadway theater). The first Grammy Awards ceremony was held on May 4, 1959, to honor the musical accomplishments of performers for the year 1958. After the 2011 ceremony, the Recording Academy overhauled many Grammy Award categories for 2012. Since 2023, the ceremony was held on the first Sunday of February and one week before the Super Bowl. The 68th Annual Grammy Awards, featuring a total of 95 categories, were presented on February 1, 2026.

After over fifty years being broadcast on CBS, it was announced on October 30, 2024, that the Grammys would move to ABC, Disney+ and Hulu as part of a ten-year broadcast deal between the Recording Academy and the Walt Disney Company. The 2027 broadcast will mark the first time the Grammys are streamed simultaneously on multiple Disney-owned platforms, including Hulu and Disney+, alongside ABC's traditional television airing.

The 69th annual ceremony is scheduled for February 7, 2027, at Crypto.com Arena in Los Angeles, marking the first broadcast on ABC since 1972 after more than five decades on CBS. The telecast will also stream live on Hulu and Disney+.

== History ==
Most recent Grammy Award winners
- 2024–25
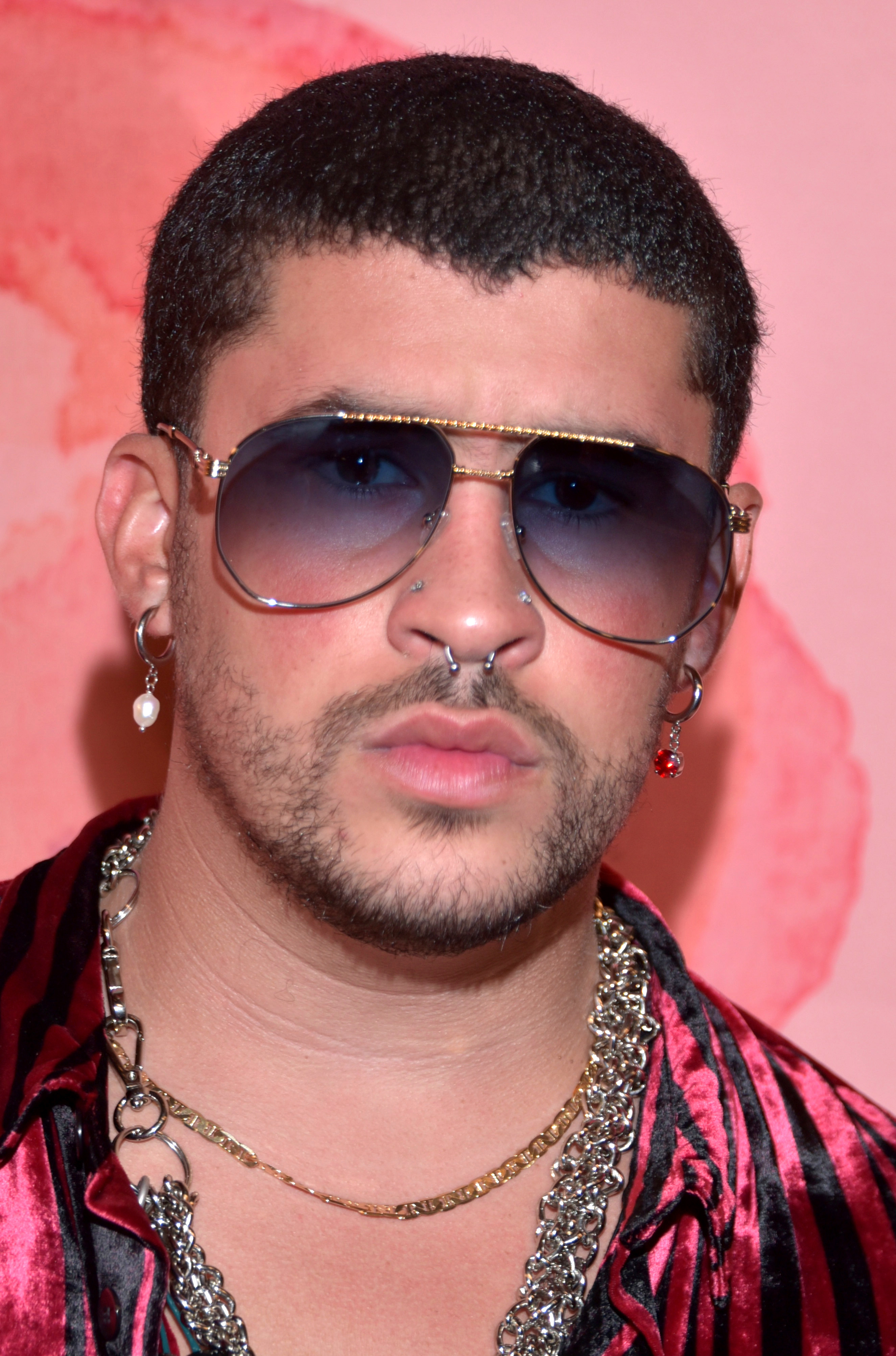

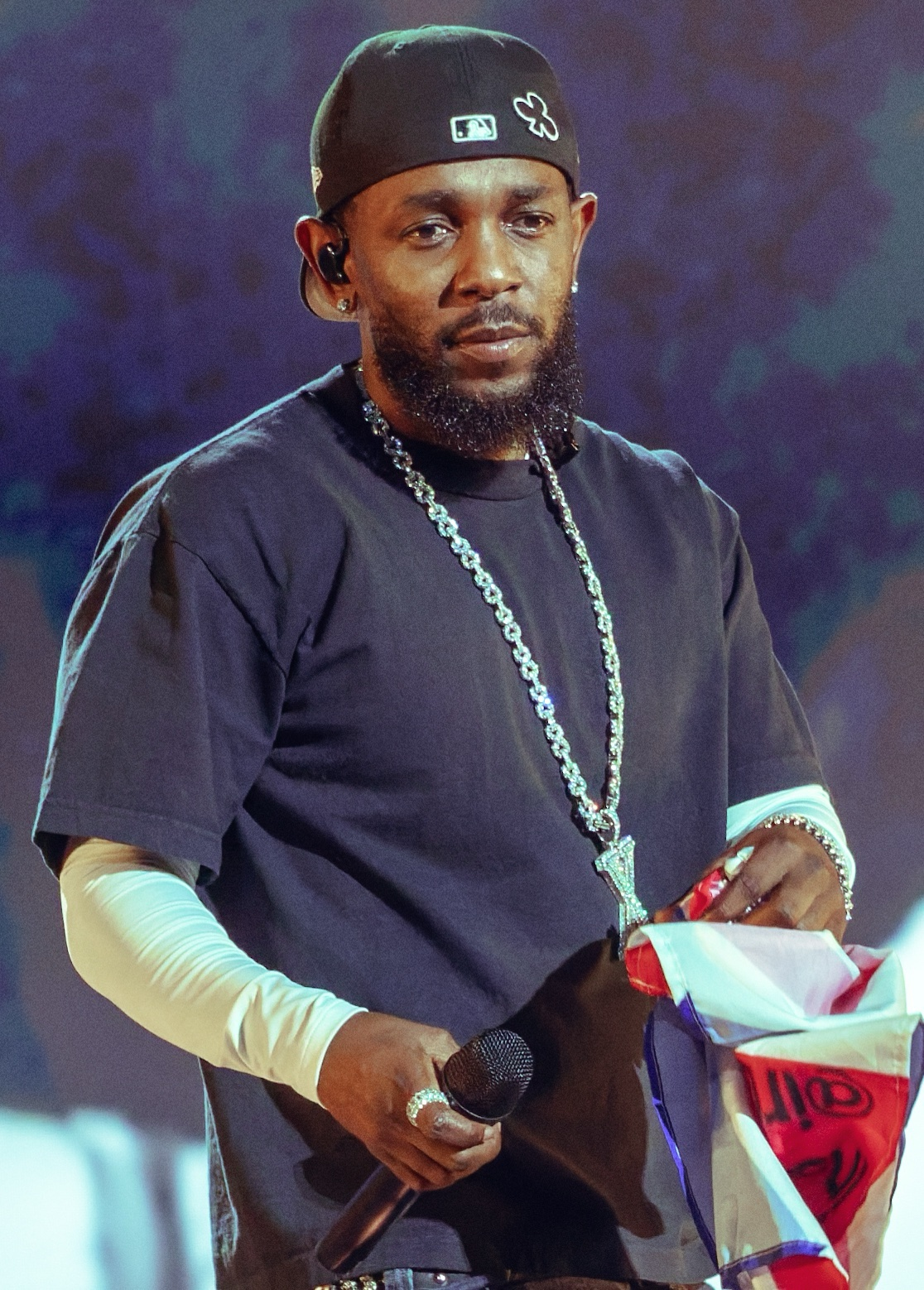

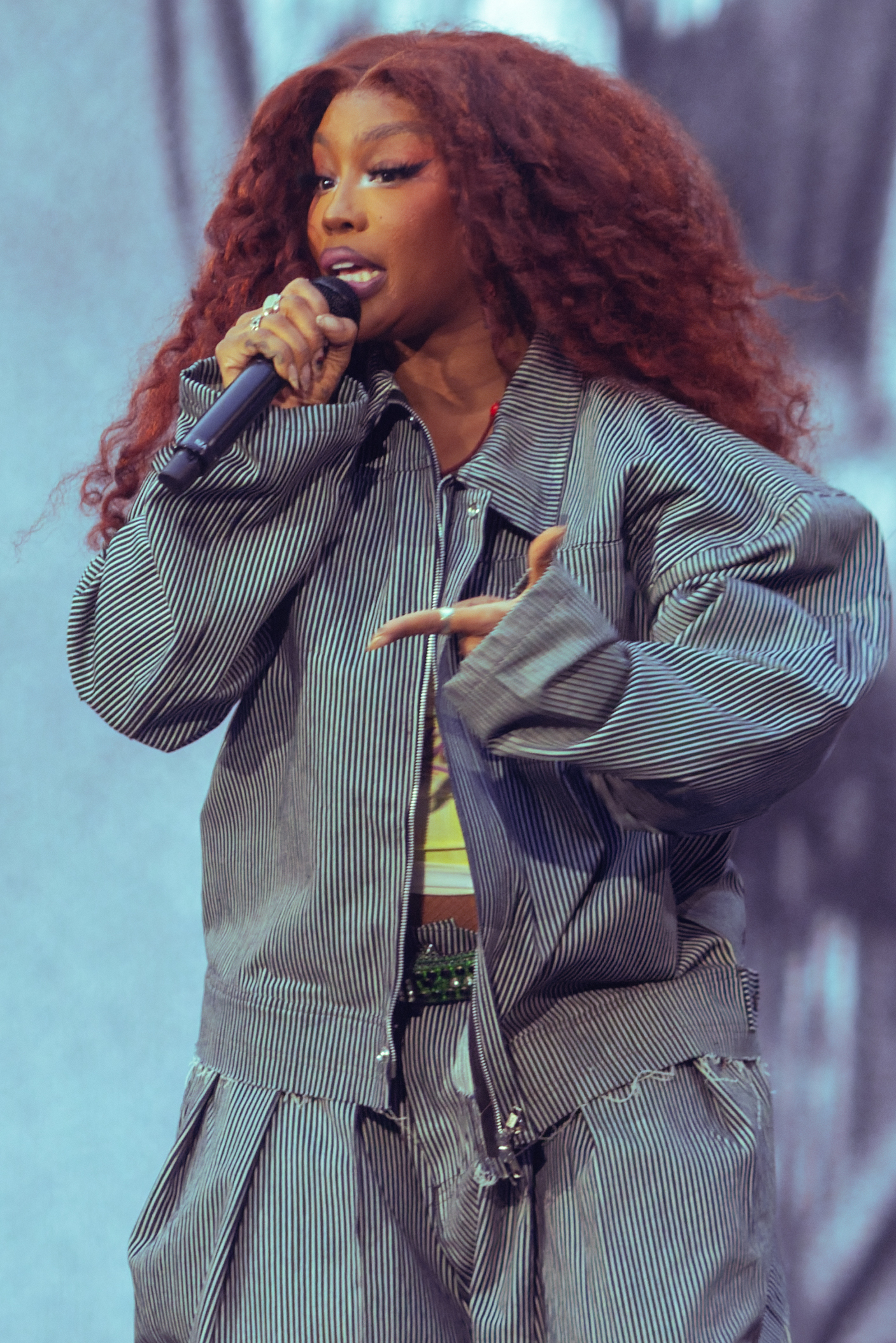

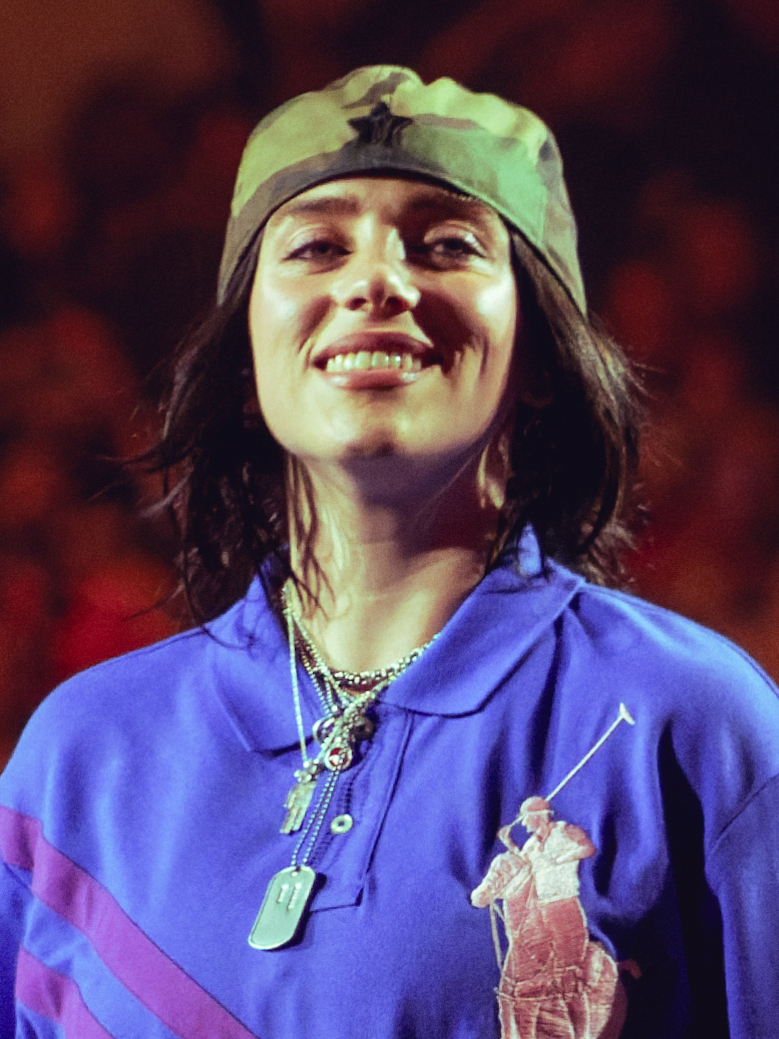

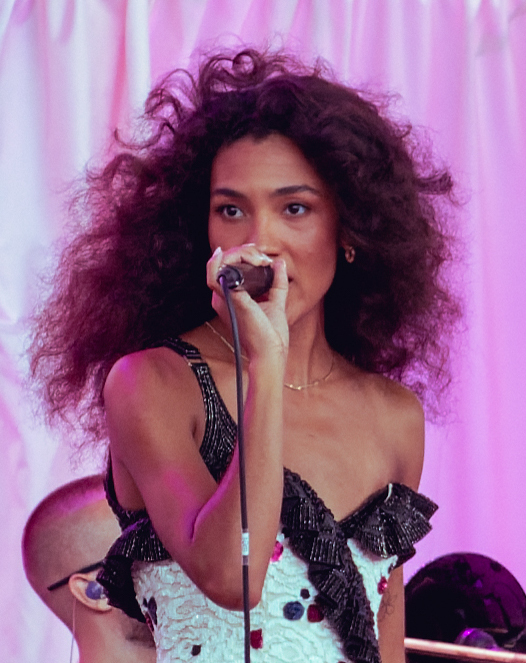
Award	Album of the Year	Record of the Year
Winner	Bad Bunny (Debí Tirar Más Fotos)	Kendrick Lamar & SZA ("Luther")
Award	Song of the Year	Best New Artist
Winner	Billie Eilish ("Wildflower")	Olivia Dean
Previous Album of the Year
Cowboy Carter
Album of the Year
Debí Tirar Más Fotos

The Grammys had their origin in the Hollywood Walk of Fame project in the 1950s. As recording executives on the Walk of Fame committee compiled a list of significant recording industry people who might qualify for a Walk of Fame star, they realized that many leading people in their business would not earn a star on Hollywood Boulevard. They determined to rectify this by creating awards given by their industry similar to the Oscars and the Emmys. After deciding to go forward with such awards, a question remained what to call them. One working title was the "Eddie", to honor Thomas Edison, the inventor of the phonograph. Eventually, the name was chosen after a mail-in contest whereby approximately 300 contestants submitted the name "Grammy", with the earliest postmark from contest winner Jay Danna of New Orleans, Louisiana, as an abbreviated reference to Emile Berliner's invention, the gramophone. Grammys were first awarded for achievements in 1958.

The first award ceremony was held simultaneously in two locations on May 4, 1959, the Beverly Hilton Hotel in Beverly Hills, California, and the Park Sheraton Hotel in New York City, New York, with 28 Grammys awarded. The number of awards given grew, reaching over 100, and fluctuated over the years with categories added and removed. The second Grammy Awards, also held in 1959, was the first ceremony to be televised. Still, the ceremony was not aired live until the 13th Annual Grammy Awards in 1971.

=== Latin Grammy Awards ===
The concept of a separate Grammy Awards for Latin music recorded in Spanish or Portuguese began in 1989, as it was deemed too large to fit on the regular Grammys ceremony. The Recording Academy then established the Latin Recording Academy in 1997, and the separate Latin Grammy Awards were first held in 2000. The Latin Grammys honor works recorded in Spanish or Portuguese from anywhere around the world that has been released either in Ibero-America, the Iberian Peninsula, or the United States.

=== COVID-19 impact ===
The 63rd Annual Grammy Awards were postponed from its original January 31, 2021, date to March 14, 2021, due to the music industry impact of COVID-19 pandemic.

The 64th Annual Grammy Awards were also postponed from its original January 31, 2022, date to April 3, 2022, due to health and safety concerns related to the COVID-19 Delta cron hybrid variant. The ceremony was also moved from the Crypto.com Arena in Los Angeles to the MGM Grand Garden Arena in Las Vegas due to the former having scheduling conflicts with sports games and concerts nearly every night through mid-April.

== Gramophone trophy ==
Ted Jensen's 2002 Grammy Award

The gold-plated trophies, each depicting a gilded gramophone, are made and assembled by hand by Billings Artworks in Ridgway, Colorado. In 1990, the original Grammy design was reworked, changing the traditional soft lead for a stronger alloy less prone to damage, making the trophy bigger and grander. Billings developed Grammium, a zinc alloy that they trademarked. Trophies engraved with each recipient's name are not available until after the award announcements, so "stunt" trophies are re-used each year for the ceremony broadcast.

By February 2009, some 7,578 Grammy trophies had been awarded.

== Ceremonies and venues ==
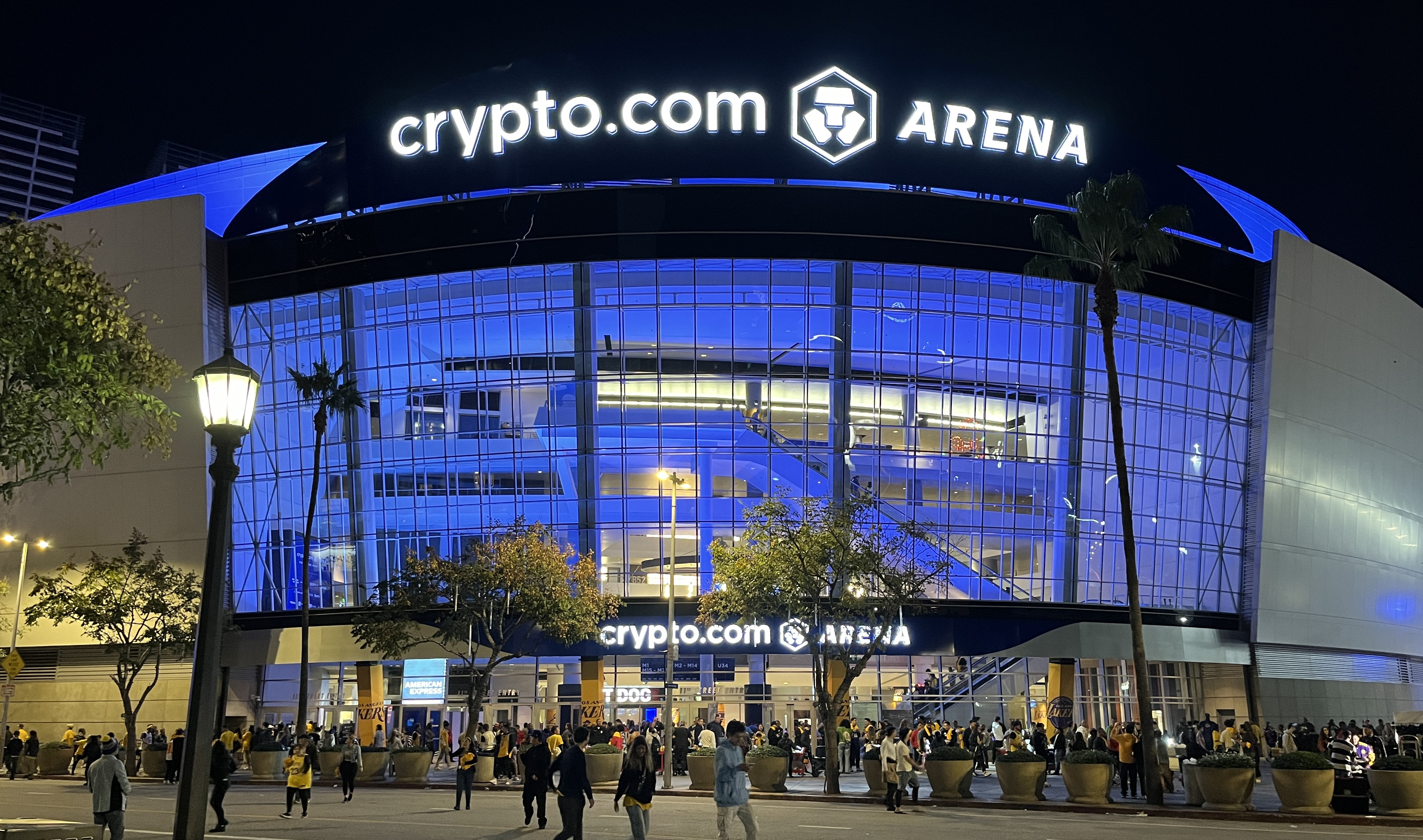
The Crypto.com Arena in Los Angeles has typically served as the venue for the Grammy Awards since 2000.

Since 2000, the Grammy Awards have been held annually at the Crypto.com Arena in Los Angeles, with a few exceptions. Before 1971, Grammy Award ceremonies were held in different locations on the same day. Originally New York City and Los Angeles were the host cities. Chicago joined as a host city in 1962, and Nashville became a fourth location in 1965.

The 1971 ceremony at the Hollywood Palladium in Los Angeles was the first to take place in one location as it was the first live telecast of the event. In 1972, the ceremony was held at Madison Square Garden's Felt Forum in New York City. In 1973, it took place at Nashville's Tennessee Theatre. From 1974 to 2003, the Grammys were held in various venues in Los Angeles and New York City, including Los Angeles' Shrine Auditorium, Crypto.com Arena and Hollywood Palladium; and New York's Madison Square Garden and Radio City Music Hall.

In 2000, the Crypto.com Arena (known as the Staples Center from 1999 to 2021) became the permanent home of the award ceremonies. The Grammy Museum was built across the street from the Crypto.com Arena in LA Live to preserve the history of the Grammy Awards. Embedded on the sidewalks on the museum streets are bronze disks, similar to the Hollywood Walk of Fame, to honor each year's top winners, Record of the Year, Best New Artist, Album of the Year, and Song of the Year. Since 2000, the Grammy Awards have taken place outside of Los Angeles only three times. New York City's Madison Square Garden hosted the awards in 2003 and in 2018, while the MGM Grand Garden Arena in Las Vegas hosted in 2022.

The annual awards ceremony at the Crypto.com Arena requires the local sports teams such as the Los Angeles Kings, Los Angeles Lakers and Los Angeles Sparks to play an extended length of road games.

== Categories ==
The "General Field" are four awards which are not restricted by music genre.

- The Album of the Year award is presented to the performer, featured artists, songwriter(s), and/or production team of a full album if other than the performer.
- The Record of the Year award is presented to the performer or production team of a single song if other than the performer.
- The Song of the Year award is presented to the songwriter(s) of a single song.
- The Best New Artist award is presented to a promising breakthrough performer (or performers) who in the eligibility year releases the first recording that establishes their public identity (which is not necessarily their first proper release).

To date, three artists have won all four awards, two won all four at once: Christopher Cross (1981) and Billie Eilish (2020). Adele won the Best New Artist award in 2009 and her other three awards in 2012 and 2017. At age 18, Eilish is the youngest artist to have won all four awards.

As of 2024, an additional two awards were added to the "General Field".

- The Producer of the Year, Non-Classical award is presented to a producer for a body of work released during the eligibility period. It was first presented in 1974 and was not previously part of any specific field.
- The Songwriter of the Year, Non-Classical award is presented to an individual who works primarily as a songwriter for a body of work released during the eligibility period. It was first presented in 2023 and was not previously part of any specific field.

Other awards are given for performance and production in specific genres and for other contributions such as artwork and video. Special awards are also given for longer-lasting contributions to the music industry.

Because of the large number of award categories (94 as of 2024), and a desire to feature several performances by various artists, only awards with the most popular interest – typically about 10 to 12, including the four general field categories and one or two categories in the most popular music genres (i.e., pop, rock, country, and rap) – are presented directly at the televised award ceremony. Most other Grammy trophies are presented in a pre-telecast "Premiere Ceremony" in the afternoon before the Grammy Awards telecast. Since 2022, all Grammy Award ceremonies have ended with the Grammy Award for Album of the Year.

=== 2012 category restructuring ===
On April 6, 2011, the Recording Academy announced a significant overhaul of many Grammy Award categories for 2012. The number of categories was cut from 109 to 78. The most substantial change was eliminating the distinction between male and female soloists and between collaborations and duo/groups in various genre fields (pop, rock, rhythm and blues [R&B], country, and rap). Additionally, several instrumental soloist categories were discontinued; recordings in these categories now fall under general categories for best solo performances.

In the rock field, the hard rock and metal album categories were combined. The Best Rock Instrumental Performance category was also eliminated.

In R&B, the distinction between best contemporary R&B album and other R&B albums has been eliminated, consolidated into one Best R&B Album category.

In rap, the categories for best rap soloist and best rap duo or group have been merged into the new Best Rap Performance category.

The roots category had the most eliminations. Up through 2011, there were separate categories for regional American music forms, such as Hawaiian, Native American, and Zydeco/Cajun music. A consistently low number of entries in these categories led the Recording Academy to combine these music variations into a new Best Regional Roots Music Album, including polka, which had lost its category in 2009.

In same-genre fields, the traditional and contemporary blues categories and the traditional and contemporary folk categories each were consolidated into one per genre due to the number of entries and the challenges in distinguishing between contemporary and traditional blues and folk songs. In the world music field, the traditional and contemporary categories also were merged.

In the classical field, several categories, including its main category Best Classical Album, were trimmed down from eleven to seven distinct categories plus two classically focused production prizes. Classical recordings since then became eligible for the main Album of the Year category.

A few minor name changes were also made to better reflect the nature of the separate categories. The Recording Academy determined that the word "gospel" in the gospel genre field tends to connote images and sounds of traditional soul gospel to the exclusion of Contemporary Christian Music (CCM). Therefore, the field and some categories were renamed as Gospel/Contemporary Christian Music.

=== Since 2012 ===
Since 2012, small adjustments have been made to lists of categories and genre fields. The number of categories has risen from 78 in 2012 to 84 since 2017. In 2020, amid the George Floyd protests, several urban, rap, and Latin music categories were renamed. In 2022, the number of awards was increased from 86 to 91. Performance categories were added for the Americana and alternative music genres alongside new categories for video game score and spoken word poetry albums. A songwriter category (non-classical) and a song for social change category were also added and several categories were adjusted slightly.

In 2023, several key changes were announced for the 66th Annual Grammy Awards, set to take place in 2024. Three new categories were announced, bringing the total number to 94, the highest since the peak of 109 in 2010. In addition, both Producer of the Year, Non-Classical and Songwriter of the Year, Non-Classical, were moved to the General Field, the first time new categories had been added to this field since the concept of the Big Four was established. The total number of fields was consolidated from 26 to 11 to ensure that all voting members would be able to exercise their allocated ten genre votes, as some members were prevented from doing so previously due to some fields only containing one category.

For the 68th Annual Grammy Awards, Best Traditional Country Album and Best Album Cover were added as categories. Best Asian Pop Music Performance, Best Latin Song, Best R&B Collaboration or Duo/Group Performance, Best Traditional Pop Vocal Performance, and Best Traditional Folk Album were introduced for the 69th Annual Grammy Awards.

== Entry process and selection of nominees ==
Members of the National Academy of Recording Arts and Sciences (NARAS), both media companies and individuals, may nominate recordings for consideration. Entries are made and submitted online. When a work is entered, review sessions are held that involve over 150 recording industry experts, to determine that the work has been entered in the correct category.

The resulting lists of eligible entries are then circulated to voting members, each of whom may vote to nominate in the general fields (Record of the Year, Album of the Year, Song of the Year, and Best New Artist) and in up to nine out of 30 other fields on their ballots. The five recordings that earn the most votes in each category become the nominees, while in some categories (craft and specialized categories) review committees determine the final five nominees. There may be over five nominees if a tie occurs in the nomination process.

Although members of the Academy of Motion Picture Arts and Sciences generally are invited to screenings or are sent DVDs of films nominated for Oscars, NARAS members do not receive nominated recordings, but instead receive access to a private online listening service.

== Final voting ==
After nominees have been determined, final voting ballots are sent to NARAS voting members, who may then vote in the general field and cast ten votes in various genre categories spread to three of the eleven fields. Members are encouraged, but not required, to vote only in their fields of expertise. Ballots are tabulated secretly by the independent accounting firm Deloitte Touche Tohmatsu. After vote tabulation, winners are announced at the Grammy Awards. The recording with the most votes in a category wins, and it is possible to have a tie (in which case the two [or more] nominees who tie are considered winners). Winners are presented with a Grammy Award; those who do not win receive a medal for their nomination.

In both voting rounds, Academy members are required to vote solely based on quality, without consideration for sales, chart performance, personal friendships, regional preferences or company loyalty. Gifts may not be accepted. Members are urged to vote in a manner that preserves the integrity of the academy and their member community. Although registered media companies may submit entries, they have no vote. Members of the media are similarly not permitted to vote.

== Certificates ==
In many categories, certificates are presented to those ineligible for a Grammy Award but who did contribute to a winning recording. These certificates are known as Participation Certificates or Winners Certificates. Those eligible for a certificate can apply for one in the weeks after the Grammy ceremony.

== Special honors ==
=== Grammy Legend ===
A special Grammy Award of merit is occasionally awarded to recognize "ongoing contributions and influence in the recording field". It has come to be known as the Grammy Legend Award and the Grammy Living Legend Award at different ceremonies. As of 2018, fourteen solo musicians and one band have received this award.

=== Salute to Industry Icons Award ===
The Grammy Salute to Industry Icons Award honors those who have made innovative contributions to the music industry. Recipients include:

- Herb Alpert and Jerry Moss
- Irving Azoff
- Martin Bandier
- Richard Branson
- Clive Davis
- Prince
- Ahmet Ertegun
- David Geffen
- Berry Gordy
- Lucian Grainge
- Jay-Z
- Debra L. Lee
- Doug Morris
- Mo Ostin
- L.A. Reid
- Sean Diddy Combs
- Julie Greenwald and Craig Kallman
- Rob Stringer
- Jon Platt

== Leading winners ==
With 35 Grammy Awards, Beyoncé is the artist with the most Grammy wins. U2, with 22 Grammy Awards, holds the record for most awards won by a group. As of the 2026 Grammy Awards, Kendrick Lamar has solidified his position as the most decorated rapper in Grammy history with 27 total career wins.

== Criticism ==
=== Commercialism ===
When Pearl Jam won a Grammy for the Best Hard Rock Performance in 1996, the band's lead singer Eddie Vedder commented on stage, "I don't know what this means. I don't think it means anything." In 2008, Glen Hansard, leader of the Irish rock group the Frames, stated that the Grammys represent something outside of the real world of music "that's fully industry based". He said he was not particularly interested in attending that year's ceremony, even though he had been nominated for two awards. Maynard James Keenan, lead singer of progressive rock band Tool, did not attend the Grammy Awards ceremony to receive one of the band's awards. He believed the Grammys to only be a promotional tool for the music industry rather than a celebration of the arts or the artist. He also accused them of catering to a low intellect and feeding the masses.

The Grammys have also been criticized for generally awarding or nominating more commercially successful albums rather than critically successful ones. In 1991, Sinéad O'Connor became the first musician to refuse a Grammy, boycotting the ceremony after being nominated for Record of the Year, Best Female Pop Vocal Performance, and Grammy Award for Best Alternative Music Performance. O'Connor would go on to win the latter award. She said her reasoning came from the Grammys' extreme commercialism. In 2024, Rhiannon Giddens described the financial strain of attending the ceremony for middle and working class musicians. She criticized the Recording Academy for introducing a policy of charging nominees $1,200 to bring a companion or significant other, saying the policy "makes it ever more obvious who is valued, and more specifically what (that would be lots of money, for the folks in the back)." A Billboard article clarified that the new policy was a tiered system, ranging from $375 to $2,000 for a ticket to attend the pre-telecast ceremony.

=== Reactions to nominations and awards ===
The Grammys also have been criticized for snubbing awards to some nominated artists. The organization's awards journey states that nominees and winners are determined solely by voting members of the Recording Academy and that voting members are active creative professionals involved in the recording process, such as performers, songwriters, producers, and engineers.

Nomination review committees, composed of anonymous industry figures, were established following the 37th Grammy Awards, which attracted criticism for the slate of Album of the Year nominations. The winner, Tony Bennett's live album MTV Unplugged, competed against the live classical album The Three Tenors in Concert 1994, Seal's second eponymous album, and the twelfth albums from Bonnie Raitt and Eric Clapton, both longtime musical mainstays. Not nominated that year were several albums that would later be recognized as classics, including Nas's debut album Illmatic, Oasis's debut album Definitely Maybe, Hole's album Live Through This, Jeff Buckley's Grace, and the debut album from Wu-Tang Clan. The nomination review committees would be disbanded in 2021 following criticism of the lack of nominations for the Weeknd's album After Hours.

At the 38th Annual Grammy Awards, artist Mariah Carey was nominated for six awards for her album Daydream, including Album of the Year and Record of the Year for her single "One Sweet Day". Although critics believed Carey would be "cleaning up" that year, Carey ultimately lost in all her nominated categories that night, much to the shock of critics and Carey herself. In 2011, Los Angeles Times journalist Randall Roberts criticized the exclusion of Kanye West's My Beautiful Dark Twisted Fantasy from Album of the Year nominations for the 54th Grammy Awards. He described West's album as "the most critically acclaimed album of the year, a career-defining record". Roberts went on to criticize the Grammy Awards for being "mired in the past" and out of touch with "new media" and trends among music listeners such as music sharing, stating:

The major nominations for the 54th annual awards clearly show that the recording academy has been working overtime to be all-inclusive, but more significantly, they also reveal a deep chasm between its goals and the listening habits of the general population...The focus is still on the old music industry model of cash-cow hits, major label investments and commercial radio...

In an article for Time, journalist Touré also responded to the snub and expressed general displeasure with the awards. He could not discern any kind of logic for their nominations and awards, while he could understand the Oscars. His existing confusion was magnified greatly when My Beautiful Dark Twisted Fantasy was not nominated for Album of the Year. He went on to compare understanding the Grammy Awards to Kremlinology and commented on the Recording Academy's exclusion of more "mature" hip hop albums as Album of the Year nominees, noting that it occasionally opts to nominate "pop-friendly" hip hop albums instead.

In a 2011 profile for The New York Times after the 53rd Grammy Awards, frontman Justin Vernon of indie band Bon Iver was asked about the Grammys and how he would react to a nomination for his group. He said he wanted to acknowledge his parents' support in his speech since they would find it stupid if he did not go, but he also wanted to tell everybody to go home instead of "pretending that this is important." He later reaffirmed this sentiment, accusing ninety-eight percent of artists in the room of being compromised by wanting to get the award. He also questioned who gave out the awards and who voted, adding that "it's just not important and people spend too much time thinking about it."

Bon Iver subsequently received four nominations in November for the 54th Grammy Awards. After winning, Vernon said in his acceptance, "It's really hard to accept this award. There's so much talent out here [...] and there's a lot of talent that's not here tonight. It's also hard to accept because you know, when I started to make songs I did it for the inherent reward of making songs, so I'm a little bit uncomfortable up here."

In his article "Everything Old Is Praised Again", Jon Caramanica of The New York Times criticized Grammy voters for being "conservative" and disregarding more "forward-looking" music and wrote in response to the 54th Grammy Awards, "for the umpteenth time, the Grammys went with familiarity over risk, bestowing album of the year honors (and several more) on an album that reinforced the values of an older generation suspicious of change." He cited the Grammy successes of Lauryn Hill's The Miseducation of Lauryn Hill (1998), Norah Jones' Come Away with Me (2003), and Adele's 21 (2011) as examples of "the Grammys drop[ping] a boatload of awards on a young female singer-songwriter and her breakthrough album". Of Kanye West's absence from the ceremony, Caramanica stated, "He didn't even bother to show up for the broadcast, which was well enough because hip-hop was almost completely marginalized."

In an article for The Huffington Post, music executive and author Steve Stoute criticized the Recording Academy and the Grammy Awards for having "lost touch with contemporary popular culture" and noted two key sources for it: "(1) over-zealousness to produce a popular show that is at odds with its own system of voting and (2) fundamental disrespect of cultural shifts as being viable and artistic." Stoute accused the academy of snubbing artists with more cultural impact, citing respective losses by the critical and commercial successes in Eminem's The Marshall Mathers LP (2000) and Kanye West's Graduation (2007) in the Album of the Year category. Stoute asserted that the expectation of the Grammys to celebrate the best in music has become undermined by hypocrisy. While he felt Steely Dan and Herbie Hancock were very talented, he also demanded acknowledgement of Eminem and West's impact, stating "It is this same cultural impact that acknowledged the commercial and critical success of Michael Jackson's Thriller in 1984."

In 2020, Canadian artist Abel Tesfaye, known by his stage name the Weeknd, was shut out from the Grammys when his fourth studio album, After Hours, received no nominations at the 63rd Annual Grammy Awards. This came as a surprise to critics, fans, and Tesfaye himself, who had a successful run in 2020 with the success of both his album and the single "Blinding Lights". Tesfaye responded by social media calling the Grammys "corrupt". Speculation arose that the announcement of his then-upcoming Super Bowl performance, as well as the discrepancy of being nominated as pop music versus R&B, contributed to the snubs. Harvey Mason, Jr., CEO of the Recording Academy, responded that he understood the Weeknd's dissatisfaction, but "Unfortunately, every year, there are fewer nominations than the number of deserving artists." He also said that the announcement of the Super Bowl performance could not have affected the nomination, as voting had ended long before then.

=== Formatting ===
The Grammys' eligibility period runs from October 1 of one year until September 30 of the next year. Records released in the fourth quarter of a given year are not eligible for that year's awards (the submissions and first round ballots are underway at that time). This is despite the quarter falling during the Christmas and holiday season, when many physical albums have been traditionally released and are heavily purchased for holiday gift giving, and when Christmas music is at its natural peak.

Fans unfamiliar with the Grammys voting window perennially hold a mistaken notion that a favorite artist has then been snubbed; for example, Adele's album 25 was released in November 2015 and thus was ineligible for nomination for the 2016 awards, despite its massive sales, earning its Grammys (including Album of the Year) instead in 2017. Conversely, the Grammys often recognize work more than a year after it was released. Taylor Swift's 1989 won Album of the Year in 2016, even though the album came out in October 2014.

=== Accusations of racial bias ===
The Grammys have also been accused of a racist bias against black recording artists. In a 2017 interview Canadian artist Drake accused the awards of seeing him only as a rapper and not as a pop-music artist due to his previous work and heritage. He criticized the snubbing of "One Dance" for the Record of the Year award and the nomination of "Hotline Bling" for Best Rap Song and Best Rap/Sung Performance, despite it not being a rap song. The Atlantic's Spencer Kornhaber accused the Grammys of "sidelining a black visionary work in favor of a white traditionalist one". Drake did not attend the 2017 awards ceremony where he was nominated. He had a performance in Manchester, England on February 12, 2017, the same night as the ceremony. Frank Ocean was vocal about boycotting the same Grammy Awards and did not submit his album Blonde for award consideration as a protest.

The Grammys were also criticized after the 59th Annual Grammy Awards when Adele's 25 (as mentioned above, released in late 2015) won Album of the Year over Beyoncé's album Lemonade (released in April 2016), which many music publications believed should have won the award. Steve Knopper of Rolling Stone magazine believed that she lost due to the Grammy voters being all white males and for her pro-Black performance during the Super Bowl 50 halftime show. USA Today also criticized Beyoncé's loss stating that "Black artists have struggled to win album of the year". They also felt 25 won only due to the album's record-breaking sales rather than having cultural significance and the large impact that Lemonade had in 2016. Adele also expressed that Lemonade should have won over her for Album of the Year, stating in her acceptance speech:

I can't possibly accept this award. And I'm very humbled and I'm very grateful and gracious. But my artist of my life is Beyoncé. And this album to me, the Lemonade album, is just so monumental. Beyoncé, it's so monumental. And so well thought out, and so beautiful and soul-baring and we all got to see another side to you that you don't always let us see. And we appreciate that. And all us artists here adore you. You are our light.

In 2019, for the first time since Outkast won Album of the Year in 2004, rap artists won major award nominations outside the rap categories when Childish Gambino won the first Song and Record of the Year awards ever for a rap song. Hispanic and Latino Americans (the largest minority in America) are also considered to be under-represented at the Grammy Awards, and their music is prone to be shifted to the categories of the Latin Grammy Awards unless they have a mainstream following.

In April 2022, the late Indian singer Lata Mangeshkar was omitted from the In Memoriam segment, and the nation's domestic media criticized the Grammys and Oscars for their Western-centric view of artists receiving attention over those throughout the rest of the world.

=== Issues with women ===
The Grammys have also been criticized for their treatment of female artists specifically. Notably at the 60th Annual Grammy Awards in 2018, New Zealand singer Lorde made headlines after turning down an offer to perform at the ceremony. She suggested that she was invited to perform alongside several other artists in a tribute to Tom Petty but was refused a solo slot, despite being nominated for the Album of the Year award and stated that each male nominee was allowed a solo performance. Lorde's mother Sonja Yelich also criticized the Grammys, pointing out an article that only nine percent of the nominees at the previous six Grammy ceremonies were women. After the ceremony, several media outlets reported that the ceremony had failed women, specifically pointing to the most nominated female artist SZA who failed to win in any of her five nominated categories, and to the Best Pop Solo Performance category which included four female nominees but was won by Ed Sheeran. Neil Portnow, president of the Recording Academy, sparked controversy after stating in an interview that female artists needed to "step up" in order to win awards. Portnow's comments were criticized by many female musicians including Pink, Katy Perry, Vanessa Carlton, Sheryl Crow, Iggy Azalea, Halsey, and Charli XCX. They also caused the hashtag #GrammysSoMale to trend on social media.

Before the 61st Annual Grammy Awards in 2019, singer Ariana Grande decided not to perform or attend that year's ceremony over a disagreement about the song choices for her performance. An anonymous source told Variety that Grande felt "insulted" when producers refused to let the singer perform her latest single "7 Rings". They compromised by having her perform the song as part of a medley, but the condition that the producers choose the second song led Grande to withdraw from the show. The source said that the same stipulations were not imposed on other performers. Grande later accused Grammy producer Ken Ehrlich of lying about why she dropped out of the show. Ehrlich had said that Grande "felt it was too late for her to pull something together". Grande responded:

I can pull together a performance over night and you know that, Ken; it was when my creativity and self expression was stifled by you, that I decided not to attend. I hope the show is exactly what you want it to be and more.

Despite the controversy, Grande won for Best Pop Vocal Album and in 2020 performed at the 62nd Annual Grammy Awards when nominated for five awards, including Album of the Year, but won none. Despite past controversies, female artists dominated the 63rd Annual Grammy Awards, with the big four awards being awarded entirely to women. Several women also broke records at that ceremony.

In May 2018, it was revealed that money intended for the Recording Academy charity MusiCares was siphoned off to pay for the cost overruns of hosting the 60th Annual Grammy Awards at New York City's Madison Square Garden. Concerning the controversies of hosting that year's Grammy Awards in New York, Dana Tomarken, the former executive vice president of the MusiCares foundation claimed wrongful termination. She alleges that she was fired for pushing back against the Academy's "boys club". She claimed that by having the MusiCares Person of the Year Tribute to Fleetwood Mac at Radio City Music Hall, the event had to forgo its traditional VIP dinner and silent auction. She had already been offered a deal to have the event at the Barclays Center in Brooklyn. The Barclays Center is owned by AEG, which competes directly with The Madison Square Garden Company which owns Madison Square Garden and Radio City. Irving Azoff, who then had a joint venture with the Madison Square Garden Company, told Tomarken that the event can not be held at Barclays and had to be held at Radio City. Oak View Group, which is associated with Azoff, received 300 of the highest price tickets to the MusiCares event at Radio City. Oak View Group was supposed to sell them as a package deal which also included tickets to the Grammy Awards themselves. MusiCares was promised to receive $1.5 million from those tickets according to Tomarken. Those 300 tickets were never sold and were then returned to MusiCares, which resulted in a loss.

In June 2019, rapper Nicki Minaj spoke up against the Grammys for allegedly blackballing her after her controversial performance of "Roman Holiday" at the 54th Annual Grammy Awards. Minaj claimed that producer Ken Ehrlich, who had previously accepted the performance, wanted her to cancel it last minute due to what he excused as the passing of Whitney Houston. Minaj however refused his request and performed anyway. She accused that shortly after the performance, Ehrlich had snubbed her from winning the Best New Artist category, which was awarded to Bon Iver. In October 2022, Minaj went after the Grammys again for snubbing her song "Super Freaky Girl" from the rap categories at the 65th Annual Grammy Awards and instead placing it in the pop categories. By way of comparison, Minaj mentioned Latto's 2021 song "Big Energy" being potentially considered for the rap categories, saying that if Minaj's own single is not being qualified as a rap song, neither should be Latto's. She also accused the Grammys of purposely placing her in those categories to favor other artists over her, such as Adele and Harry Styles. After Minaj's comments, Latto later responded to her in a series of tweets, leading them into a back-and-forth argument. Subsequently, Minaj's song was not nominated for any categories for the ceremony, while Latto received nominations for the Best New Artist category as well as the Best Melodic Rap Performance category for the latter song.

Recording Academy CEO Deborah Dugan was placed on leave on January 16, 2020, after a complaint of bullying from a member of staff (according to an anonymous New York Times source), ten days before the 62nd Annual Grammy Awards. Dugan had complained internally, alleging a broken system of voting that was subject to conflicts of interest and unnecessary spending. On the nominations for the 61st Annual Grammy Awards, she stated that the voting process was an "outrageous conflict of interest" with several nominated artists sitting on the voting boards of their prospective categories. She claimed that "one artist who initially ranked 18 out of 20 in the 2019 'Song of the Year' category ended up with a nomination". She also claimed that a few artists like Ed Sheeran and Ariana Grande had the votes to be nominated for the category, but were ultimately omitted.

In 2020, comedy star Tiffany Haddish turned down the invitation to host the 63rd Annual Grammy Awards pre-telecast premiere ceremony when they said that she would have to pay her own way. In an exclusive interview with Variety, Haddish revealed that she was told to cover the cost of hair, makeup, and wardrobe for the three-hour event, adding, "I don't know if this might mean I might not get nominated ever again, but I think it's disrespectful". When contacted, the Recording Academy explained that the premiere ceremony is not a CBS program and is hosted by the Academy, a not-for-profit organization, meaning that artists, hosts and performers have to perform free every year. They also noted that the issue would have no impact in Haddish's future nomination.

In 2022, the Grammys were criticized for nominating, and subsequently awarding, Louis C.K. a Best Comedy Album prize for his comedy special Sincerely Louis C.K. The album made light of, and included jokes about, the multiple sexual misconduct revelations he had admitted to years earlier. In 2023, the Grammys faced significant backlash for debuting a new award called the Dr. Dre Global Impact Award, due to the rapper's history of violence against women.

=== Criticism over the Best Asian Pop Performance category ===
In July 2026, the Recording Academy faced criticism following the introduction of the Best Asian Pop Music Performance category for the 69th Annual Grammy Awards. Critics argued that creating a region-specific category for Asian pop music risked segregating Asian artists from the general pop fields rather than promoting equal recognition. On July 29, South Korean group BTS announced that they would not submit to the Grammy Awards and withdraw their music from consideration, stating that "(They) have decided not to submit for Grammy consideration this year. We hope our music can be heard and loved for what it is, rather than being divided by region or language.", calling for Asian artists to be evaluated alongside all other international acts in existing genre categories.

The announcement prompted widespread discussion within the global music industry and among fans. Several media outlets described BTS's decision as one of the most significant public challenges to the Recording Academy's diversity initiatives since the group first received Grammy nominations. The controversy also had industry commentators debating whether the award represented greater recognition for Asian music or reinforced geographic and cultural separation within the Grammy Awards.

== TV broadcasts and ratings ==
Before the first live Grammys telecast in 1971 on ABC, a series of filmed annual specials in the 1960s called The Best on Record was broadcast on NBC. The first Grammy Award telecast took place on the night of November 29, 1959, as an episode of the NBC anthology series NBC Sunday Showcase, which normally was devoted to plays, original TV dramas, and variety shows. Until 1971, awards ceremonies were held in both New York and Los Angeles, with winners accepting at one of the two venues. Television producer Pierre Cossette bought the rights to broadcast the ceremony from the National Academy of Recording Arts and Sciences and organized the first live telecast. CBS bought the rights in 1973 after moving the ceremony to Nashville, Tennessee; the American Music Awards were created for ABC by Dick Clark as a result.

The Recording Academy announced on June 21, 2011, that it had reached a new deal with CBS to keep the awards show on the network for another 10 years. As part of the new contract, the network would also air a "nominations concert" special in the last week of November, where nominations would be released during a special exclusive to CBS, rather than at a traditional early-morning press conference to a multi-network press pool. This was ended after the 2016 concert due to low ratings and criticism about the announcement format, and as of the 2017 nominations, they have been revealed in a roundtable conversation with Recording Academy representatives during CBS Mornings, though since 2020, it has returned to a traditional noontime Eastern press release statement and highlight of in-show award nominees on social media. In 2016, the Grammys became the first awards show to regularly air live annually in all U.S. territories, and for decades, alongside the Academy Awards, Primetime Emmy Awards and Tony Awards, the shows have aired live in over 150 countries worldwide.

From 2004 to 2019, the Grammys were held on the second Sunday of February (the week after the Super Bowl), with two exceptions: if that day was February 14 (Valentine's Day), it was moved to the following day; if it was a Winter Olympics year, it was held earlier on the last Sunday of January (the week before the Super Bowl). Starting in 2020, the Academy Awards ceremony would move back to the second Sunday of February, forcing the Grammys to move back to the last Sunday of January to avoid conflict with either the Oscars or the Super Bowl. To allow enough time for preparation, the cutoff date for eligible recordings would move from September 30 to August 31. This change reduced the eligibility period for the 2020 awards to eleven months (October 1, 2018 – August 31, 2019), a month shorter than usual.

CBS last renewed its rights to the Grammys in 2016 under a ten-year deal through 2026, making it the longest continuous broadcasting partnership between an awards presentation and a U.S. television network. On October 30, 2024, the Recording Academy announced that the Grammys would return to ABC and stream on Hulu and Disney+ beginning in 2027, under a ten-year deal. The agreement came amid cost-cutting by CBS parent company Paramount Global, which had also dropped the Academy of Country Music Awards in favor of its in-house CMT Music Awards, while picking up rights to the American Music Awards earlier in the year.

=== Viewership by year ===
Year	Viewers (millions)	Rating/Share (households)	Average ad price (30s)	Ref.
1974	N/A	30.3/52	N/A	
1975	N/A	16.4/30	N/A	
1976	N/A	23.8/47	N/A	
1977	28.86	21.3/38	N/A	
1978	N/A	26.6/44	N/A	
1979	31.31	21.9/34	N/A	
1980	32.39	23.9/39	N/A	
1981	28.57	21.2/34	N/A	
1982	24.02	18.2/29	N/A	
1983	30.86	25.6/33	N/A	
1984	51.67	30.8/45	N/A	
1985	37.12	23.8/35	N/A	
1986	30.39	20.3/32	$205,500	
1987	27.91	18.3/27	$264,200	
1988	32.76	21.1/33	$299,900	
1989	23.57	16.0/26	$318,300	
1990	28.83	18.9/31	$330,600	
1991	28.89	18.8/31	$319,200	
1992	23.10	16.2/27	$352,900	
1993	29.87	19.9/31	$401,500	
1994	23.69	16.1/24	$407,700	
1995	17.27	11.8/19	$399,100	
1996	21.50	14.6/23	$304,800	
1997	19.21	13.4/22	$346,300	
1998	25.04	17.0/27	$315,600	
1999	24.88	16.6/26	$472,000	
2000	27.79	17.3/27	$505,500	
2001	26.65	16.7/26	$574,000	
2002	18.96	11.9/19	$573,900	
2003	24.82	14.7/23	$610,300	
2004	26.29	15.7/24	$654,600	
2005	18.80	11.6/18	$703,900	
2006	17.00	10.9/17	$675,900	
2007	20.05	12.1/19	$557,300	
2008	17.18	10.3/16	$572,700	
2009	19.04	10.3/16	$592,000	
2010	25.80	TBD	$426,000	
2011	26.55	10.0/25	$630,000	
2012	39.91	14.1/32	$768,000	
2013	28.37	10.1/25	$850,000–$900,000+	
2014	28.51	9.9/25	$800,000–$850,000	
2015	25.30	8.5/23	$1,000,000	
2016	24.95	7.7/22	$1,200,000	
2017	26.05	7.8/22		
2018	19.80	5.9/21		
2019	19.88	5.6/22		
2020	18.70	5.4/22		
2021	9.23	2.1/22		
2022	9.59			
2023	12.55			
2024	16.9			
2025	15.4			
2026	14.41			

== See also ==
- List of Grammy Award winners and nominees by country
- List of music awards – Award given for an accomplishment in the field of music
