= Let's Call It a Day Girl =

Single by The Razor's Edge
- B-side: "Avril (April)"
- Released: July 1966
- Genre: Pop
- Label: Pow! Records
- Songwriters: Irwin Levine, Neil Sheppard
- Producer: Bob Yorey Ent. Inc.

"Let's Call It a Day Girl"

Single by Bobby Vee
- B-side: "I'm Gonna Make It Up to You"
- Released: July 1969
- Genre: Pop
- Label: Liberty
- Songwriters: Irwin Levine, Neil Sheppard
- Producer: Snuff Garrett

Bobby Vee singles chronology
"(I'm Into Lookin' For) Someone to Love Me" (1968)	"Let's Call It a Day Girl" (1969)	"I'm Gonna Make It Up to You" (1969)

"Let's Call It a Day Girl" is a 1966 song which became a hit for Florida-based pop rock group The Razor's Edge. The song was written by Irwin Levine and Neil Sheppard. Bobby Vee also recorded the song, with his rendition becoming a hit three years later.

Both Vee's version and The Razor's Edge's version charted in the United States and Canada, with The Razor's Edge having the larger hit in both nations (U.S. #77, Canada #57). The B-side of Vee's record, "I'm Gonna Make It Up to You," also reached the charts (U.S. #132), however, both songs were non-album tracks and neither rendition appeared on an LP.

== Other versions ==
"Let's Call It a Day Girl" was also recorded by The Four Preps in 1966, also a non-album track.

== Chart history ==
The Razor's Edge

Chart (1966)	Peak position
Canada RPM Top Singles	57
US Billboard Hot 100	77
US Cash Box Top 100	72

Bobby Vee

Chart (1969)	Peak position
Canada RPM Top Singles	79
US Billboard Hot 100	92
US Cash Box Top 100	97
