= Friend & Lover =

American folk-singing duo

Friend & Lover was an American folk-singing duo composed of husband-and-wife team Jim and Cathy Post. The duo is best known for its hit single "Reach out of the Darkness", which reached number 10 on the U.S. Billboard Hot 100 chart in the summer of 1968.

== Biographical information ==
Cathy Conn was born May 30, 1945, in Chicago, Illinois, United States. She had a background in song and dance before meeting her future husband Jim Post at a Canadian provincial fair in 1964. Their marriage and the band eventually broke up. Cathy remarried twice, became Cat Conn, had three children and five grandchildren, and lived for a short time in the mountains of New Mexico. In 2015 or 2016, she moved back into Chicago to live out the rest of her days with two of her grandchildren and one of her first children. She died in Evanston, Illinois, on July 4, 2018, at 73.

Jim Post was born October 28, 1939, in Houston, Texas. He had previously performed with a folk group, The Rum Runners. He went on to record solo albums for labels such as Flying Fish Records and Fantasy Records. Post died in Dubuque, Iowa, after a long illness on September 14, 2022, at the age of 82.

== Reach out of the Darkness ==
Jim, inspired by a New York City love-in, wrote the duo's only significant hit single, "Reach Out of the Darkness". The song was recorded in Nashville, Tennessee, with Ray Stevens and Joe South on the session, and released on the Verve Forecast label (although the Verve Records Discography had a completely different account of the song and its flip "Time on Your Side (You're Only 15 Years Old)" being recorded on August 23, 1967, in New York City, but the location was updated some time later to Atlanta, Georgia, nevertheless still with the sides reversed). The song made the U.S. Top 10 chart in June 1968 and was adopted as a kind of anthem by the protest movement against American politics of the time. It was included as the title track of a follow-up album in 1969. The song appeared in the movie 1969, Aquarius: "A Change is Gonna Come" (season 1, episode 5), Beverly Hills, 90210: "The Time Has Come Today" (season 4, episode 25), and Mad Men: "Man With a Plan" (season 6, episode 7).

== Discography ==
=== Albums ===
| Year | Album | Record Label |
|---|---|---|
| 1968 | Reach Out of the Darkness | Verve Forecast Records |

==== Track listing ====
1. "Boston Is a Lovely Town"
2. "I'm a Woman, I'm a Man"
3. "Zig-Zag"
4. "Saturday's Hero"
5. "Room to Let (to Rowena with Love)"
6. "Reach out of the Darkness"
7. "A Wise Man Changes His Mind"
8. "Ode to a Dandelion"
9. "If Love Is in Your Heart"
10. "The Weddin' March (I Feel Groovy)"
11. "The Way We Were in the Beginning"

=== Singles ===
| Year | Title | Peak chart position | Record Label | B-side | Album |
| Year | Title | US | Record Label | B-side | Album |
|---|---|---|---|---|---|
| 1965 | "Santa's Got a Brand New Bag" (as Jim and Cathy) | – | Cadet Records | "People Stand Back" | |
| 1967 | "A Town Called Love" | – | ABC Records | "If Tomorrow" | |
| 1967 | "Reach out of the Darkness" | 10 | Verve Forecast; Records | "Time on Your Side (You're Only 15 Years Old)" | Reach out of the Darkness |
| 1968 | "If Love Is in Your Heart" | 86 | Verve Forecast; Records | "Zig-Zag" | Reach out of the Darkness |
| 1969 | "Circus" | – | Verve Forecast; Records | "I Want to Be Free" | |
| 1969 | "A Wise Man Changes His Mind" | – | Verve Forecast; Records | "Ode to a Dandelion" | Reach out of the Darkness |
| 1970 | "Hard Lovin'" | – | Cadet Concept Records | "Colorado Exile" | |
