= Tennessee Theatre (Nashville) =

- Interactive map of Tennessee Theatre
- Address: 535 Church Street; Nashville, Tennessee; United States
- Coordinates: 36.16265°N 86.78107°W
- Capacity: 2,028

Construction
- Opened: February 28, 1952
- Demolished: 1980s
- Architect: Joseph W. Holman

The Tennessee Theatre was a 2,028 seat, single screen movie and stage theater at 535 Church Street, in Nashville, Tennessee was opened on February 28, 1952. It was built with the designs of architect Joseph W. Holman in the shell of the 11-story, Art Deco Sudekum Building, also known as Warner building, that was completed in 1932, The theater was demolished in the 1980s. The high rise office building was imploded on November 29, 1992 The Cumberland Apartment high-rise now sits on the site. The theater hosted the first Grammy Awards ceremony not held in either Los Angeles or New York City in 1973 — it would be 49 years until the Grammys were held outside those two cities (Las Vegas).
