= Siegel–Schwall Band =

American electric blues band

- Origin: Chicago Illinois, United States
- Genres: Electric blues Blues-rock
- Years active: 1964–1974; 1987–2016
- Labels: Vanguard; Wooden Nickel; Alligator
- Past members: Corky Siegel; Jim Schwall; Jos Davidson; Russ Chadwick; Jack Dawson; John Sauter; Sam Lay; Rollo Radford; Shelly Plotkin; Arthur Irby
- Website: siegelschwall.com

The Siegel–Schwall Band was an American electric blues band from Chicago, Illinois. The band was formed in 1964 by Corky Siegel (piano, harmonica, vocals) and Jim Schwall (guitar, mandolin, vocals). They played many live shows, and released ten albums. They disbanded in 1974. The Siegel–Schwall Band performed occasional concerts, and released two more albums, from 1987 to 2016.

== History ==
Corky Siegel and Jim Schwall met each other when both were music students at Roosevelt University. Siegel, originally a saxophonist, was interested in blues, while Schwall's background was mostly in country music. They combined these two genres, producing a lighter sounding blues as compared to Butterfield Blues Band or John Mayall. The Siegel–Schwall Band included Shelly Plotkin on drums and Jos Davidson on bass. Davidson had previously played with Steve Miller and the Ardells.

They were the house band at Pepper's Lounge on Chicago's South Side. Every important Chicago blues musician sat in with Corky and Jim at Pepper's, including Junior Wells, Buddy Guy, Billy Boy Arnold, Little Walter, Muddy Waters, Magic Sam, Otis Spann, Bo Diddley, Lazy Lester and Sam Lay. The band moved to Big John's in Old Town after the Butterfield Blues Band began touring and left a vacancy.

In 1965, Sam Charters signed the band to Vanguard Records. In 1966, the band released their first eponymous album, and began a national tour in 1969. While they were not as commercially successful as Butterfield or Mayall, the band was still able to perform at large venues such as Fillmore West. Also around that time, the Siegel–Schwall Band became the first blues band to ever perform with a symphony. They performed "Three Pieces for Blues Band and Symphony Orchestra" with the San Francisco Symphony. The piece was written by William Russo and conducted by Seiji Ozawa. After four albums with Vanguard, the band signed with Wooden Nickel, a Chicago label distributed by RCA. Their first release on the label won a Grammy Award for Best Album Cover in 1973.

The band broke up in 1974 after releasing the album R.I.P. Siegel/Schwall, and reunited in 1987. Alligator Records signed them and released a live reunion album in 1988. The band continued to tour occasionally, usually during summer because Schwall was by now a professor of music. Schwall also ran unsuccessfully for mayor of Madison, Wisconsin. The Siegel–Schwall Band released a second album on Alligator Records in 2005, entitled Flash Forward, which was a top 15 hit on the Billboard Blues Albums chart.

In 1975, Siegel formed the Happy Year Band with drummer/vocalist Sam Lay, Albert Joseph on guitar and Rollo Radford on bass. Siegel later formed the ensemble Chamber Blues with a string quartet, tabla and harmonica/piano. This unusual group featured Frank Donaldson a veteran drummer who spent 20 years with jazz musician Ramsey Lewis. Siegel continues to record, has earned several composing honors and is a regular performer and lecturer in the Chicago Public Schools. In 2007 he wrote a book, Let Your Music Soar: The Emotional Connection. The Siegel–Schwall Band toured in 2014 with Siegel, Schwall, Radford, Lay, and Sambo Arthur Irby. Lay died on January 29, 2022, in Chicago, aged 86. Jim Schwall died at the age of 79 on June 19, 2022, in Tucson, Arizona.

== Discography ==
Studio and live albums

- The Siegel–Schwall Band (1966, Vanguard)
- Say Siegel–Schwall (1967, Vanguard)
- Shake! (1968, Vanguard)
- Siegel–Schwall '70 (1970, Vanguard)
- The Siegel–Schwall Band (1971, Wooden Nickel)
- Sleepy Hollow (1972, Wooden Nickel)
- 953 West (1973, Wooden Nickel)
- Three Pieces for Blues Band and Symphony Orchestra (1973, Deutsche Grammophon)
- Live: The Last Summer (1974, Wooden Nickel)
- R.I.P. Siegel/Schwall (1974, Wooden Nickel)
- The Siegel–Schwall Reunion Concert (1988, Alligator)
- Flash Forward (2005, Alligator)

Compilation albums

- The Best of Siegel–Schwall (1974, Vanguard)
- Where We Walked (1966–1970) (1991, Vanguard)
- The Wooden Nickel Years (1971–1974) (1999, Varèse Sarabande)
- The Complete Vanguard Recordings and More (2001, Vanguard)
- Vanguard Visionaries (2007, Vanguard)
