= Jim Post =

American singer-songwriter (1939–2022)

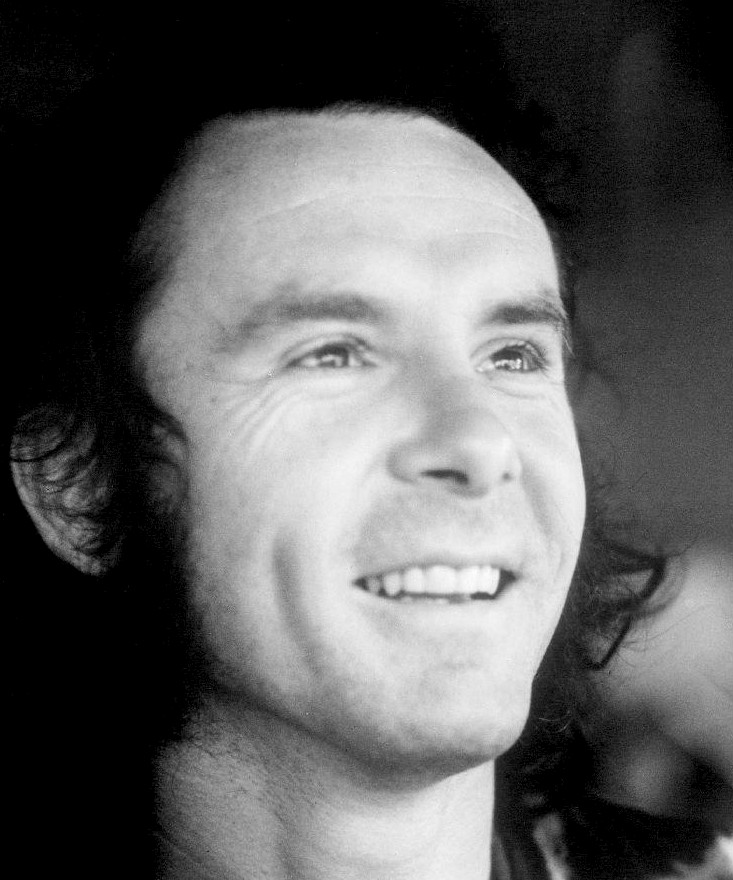
- Post in 1975

Background information
- Born: Jimmie David Post; October 28, 1939; Houston, Texas, U.S.
- Died: September 14, 2022 (aged 82) Dubuque, Iowa, U.S.
- Genres: Folk, pop, country
- Occupation: Singer-songwriter
- Instrument: Guitar
- Years active: 1960s–2022
- Labels: Flying Fish, Fantasy
- Website: http://www.jimpost.com/

Jimmie David Post (October 28, 1939 – September 14, 2022) was an American folk singer-songwriter, composer, and playwright. In 1968, his pop song "Reach out of the Darkness" charted on the Billboard Hot 100 for 14 weeks, peaking at number 10.

== Life and career ==
Jim Post was born in Houston, Texas. He performed and recorded in the 1960s as the duo Friend and Lover with his then wife, Cathy Conn Post. He worked as a solo singer-songwriter in Chicago and throughout the Midwest in the 1970s and 1980s. Post was a regular performer at the Earl of Old Town and other Chicago folk music bars, and was a contemporary of notable singer-songwriters Steve Goodman, John Prine, Fred Holstein, and Bonnie Koloc, and a frequent collaborator with singer-songwriter and multi-instrumentalist Mick Scott and Tom Dundee. In 1971, he produced and played on an album of Chicago folk musicians, Gathering at the Earl of Old Town, that included the first recording of Goodman's "City of New Orleans". Starting in 1985, he hosted the Flea Market folk show played on WBEZ live at Navy Pier. During the 1990s and 2000s, he focused on performing the character of Mark Twain in one-man shows in a style similar to that of Hal Holbrook's Mark Twain Tonight and Mike Randall's Mark Twain Live. Post has also recorded an album of children's songs.

Post lived in Galena, Illinois. He was a guest on Ellen in a segment titled "Awesome Album Covers", where the talk-show host teased him about his album I Love My Life.

Post died from congestive heart failure on September 14, 2022, at the age of 82.

== Discography ==
Year	Title	Label	Number	Notes
1968	Reach Out of the Darkness	Verve Forecast	FTS 3055	As Friend and Lover
1972	Slow to 20	Fantasy	9408	
1973	Colorado Exile	Fantasy	9401	
1973	Rattlesnake	Fantasy	9425	
1976	Looks Good to Me	Fantasy	9451	
1977	Back on the Street Again	Mountain Railroad	52778	Live
1978	I Love My Life	Mountain Railroad	52784	
1979	Magic: In Concert	Flying Fish	FF-216	Live
1980	Ship Shape	Flying Fish	FF-240	Live
1984	The Crooner from Outer Space	Freckle	1905	
1987	Jim Post & Friends	Flying Fish	FF-419	
1987	Galena Rose	self released		CD
1989	The Heart of Christmas	Chicago Master Works	1263	CD
1996	Mark Twain and the Laughing River	Woodside Avenue	WA-006-2	CD
2000	Frog in the Kitchen Sink			CD, children's songs
