= Corky Siegel =

American musician

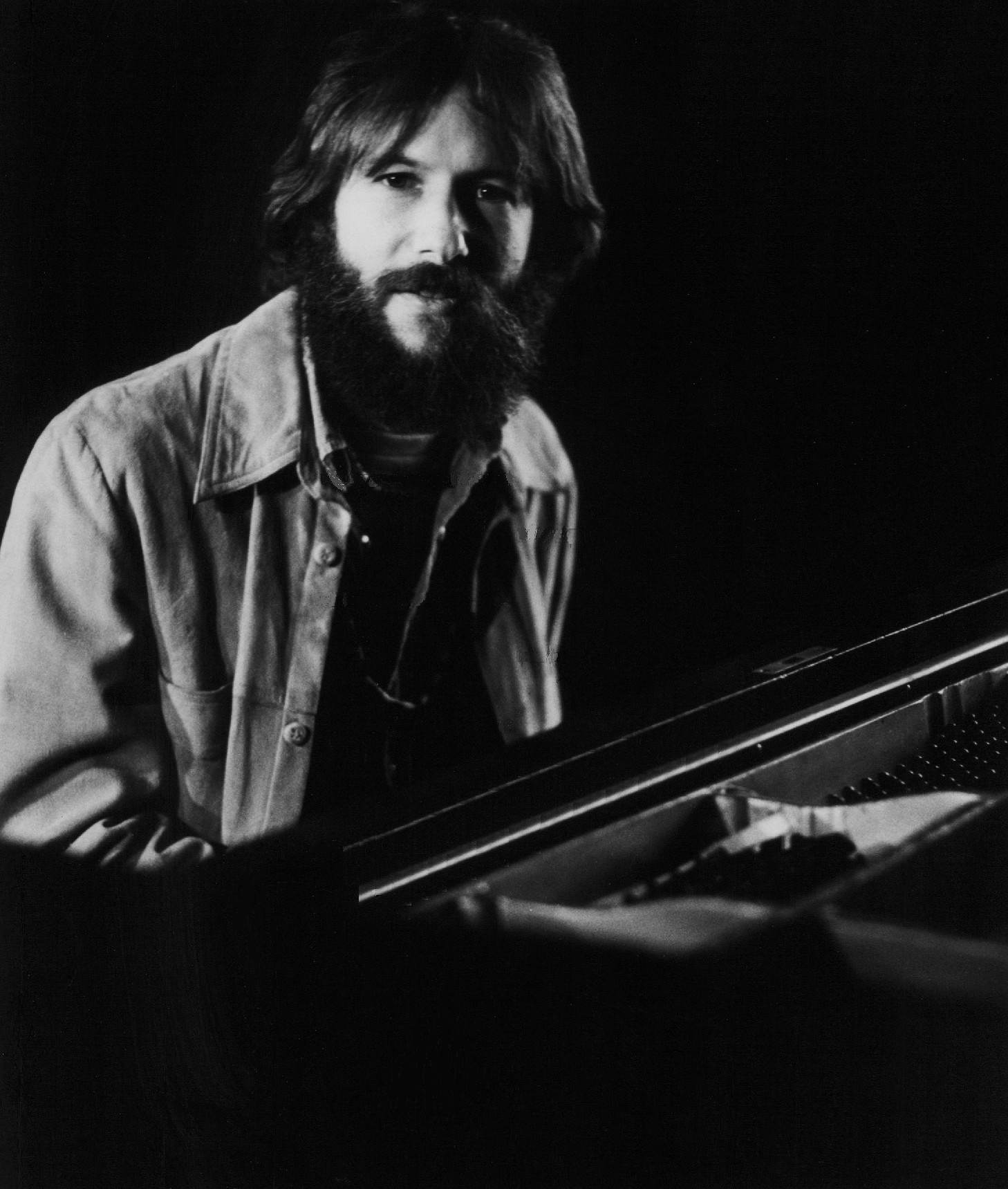
- Siegel in 1975

Background information
- Born: Mark Paul Siegel; October 24, 1943 (age 82)
- Origin: Chicago, Illinois, United States
- Genres: Blues, third stream, classical crossover
- Occupations: Musician, composer
- Instruments: Harmonica, piano
- Years active: 1964–present
- Member of: Chamber Blues
- Formerly of: Siegel-Schwall Band
- Website: corkymusic.com

Mark Paul "Corky" Siegel (born October 24, 1943) is an American musician, singer-songwriter, and composer. He plays harmonica and piano. He plays and writes blues and blues-rock music, and has also worked extensively on combining blues and classical music. He is best known as the co-leader of the Siegel-Schwall Band, and as the leader of the Chamber Blues group.

== Musical career ==
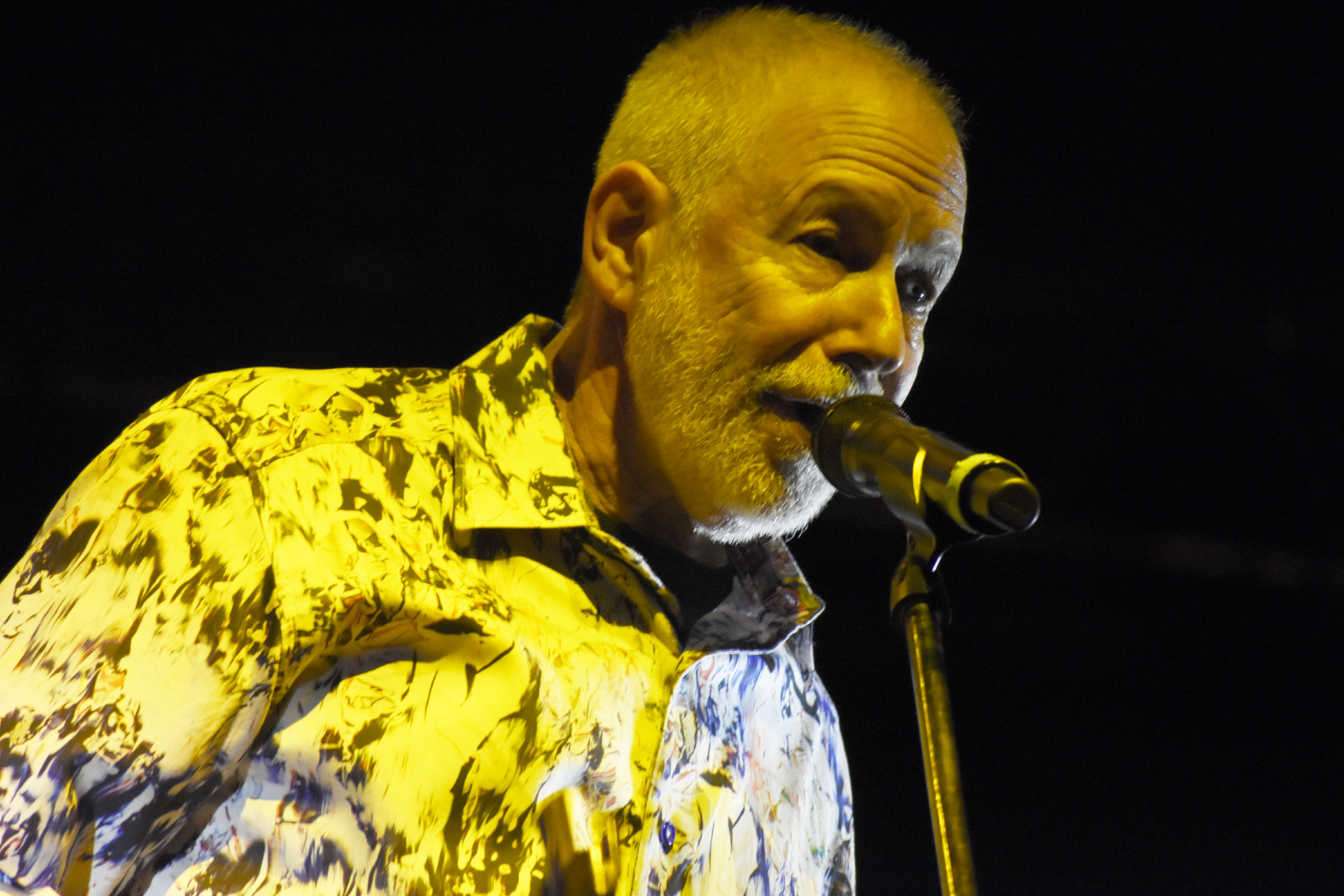
Siegel in 2019

Corky Siegel's professional music career began in 1964, when he met guitarist Jim Schwall. Both were studying music at Roosevelt University in Chicago. The two became a duo, performing blues music. They landed a regular gig at Pepper's Show Lounge, where well known, established blues musicians such as Muddy Waters, Howlin' Wolf, Buddy Guy, Junior Wells, Magic Slim, and Willie Dixon would often sit in. Siegel later said "I owe my whole musical life to this experience and to those blues masters and to Johnny Pepper who had an open mind to have us beginners get up on that stage night after night." After a while the duo became a quartet, the Siegel-Schwall Band.

The Siegel-Schwall Band enjoyed increasing popularity, and by 1967 were touring nationally, playing at large rock venues like the Fillmore West and sharing the bill with famous rock bands. Between 1966 and 1974, they released ten albums. After 1974, they stopped playing concerts, but the band re-formed in 1987. They released two albums of new material. Until "Siegel-Schwall lovingly disbanded" in March 2016, they still played occasional live dates and featured drummer Sam Lay and bassist Rollo Radford; Lay played with Siegel in the Happy Year Band of 1973 which also featured Chicago blues guitarist Albert Joseph.

The idea of combining blues and classical music was first suggested by classical conductor Seiji Ozawa. Ozawa brought together the Siegel-Schwall Band and the Chicago Symphony Orchestra. They first performed "Three Pieces for Blues Band and Symphony Orchestra", by William Russo in 1968. In 1973, the band and Ozawa released a recording of this work performed with the San Francisco Symphony. In 1975, Siegel and Ozawa, with the San Francisco Symphony, first performed another William Russo work, "Street Music: A Blues Concerto". A recording of this piece was released in 1979.

Inspired by his collaboration with Ozawa, Corky Siegel formed Chamber Blues in 1988. The group's music combines elements of classical, blues, and jazz. The band consists of a string quartet – two violins, a viola, and a cello – along with percussionist Frank Donaldson, and Siegel on harmonica and also sometimes doubling on piano. As of early 2019, Chamber Blues has released four albums, and still tours nationally and internationally.

Siegel has also worked on numerous other musical projects. In 2004, he was a member of the Chicago Blues Reunion band, which released the album Buried Alive in the Blues. In April 2013, Siegel was inducted into the Chicago Blues Hall of Fame.

== Book ==
With Peter Krammer, Corky Siegel wrote a book for musicians and music students, called Let Your Music Soar: The Emotional Connection. It was published by Nova Vista Publishing in 2007.

== Discography ==
For Siegel's recordings with the Siegel-Schwall Band, see Siegel-Schwall Band.

- Corky Siegel – Corky Siegel (1974 – Dharma)
- Street Music: A Blues Concerto – San Francisco Symphony and Corky Siegel (1977 – Deutsche Grammophon)
- Out of the Blue – Corky Siegel (1980 – Stuff)
- Goodbye California – Corky Siegel (1984 – Skitzo/Frenia – re-release of Out of the Blue)
- Corky Siegel's Chamber Blues – Chamber Blues (1994 – Alligator)
- Complementary Colors – Chamber Blues (1998 – Gadfly)
- Solo Flight – Corky Siegel (1999 – Gadfly)
- Corky Siegel's Traveling Chamber Blues Show – Chamber Blues (2005 – Alligator)
- Buried Alive in the Blues – Chicago Blues Reunion (2005 – 33rd Street)
- Different Voices – Chamber Blues (2017 – Dawnserly)
- More Different Voices – Chamber Blues (2022 – Dawnserly)
- Something Wrong – Corky Siegel (2022 – Dawnserly)
- Songs for Truth and Harmony – Corky Siegel (2022 – Dawnserly)
- Symphonic Blues No. 6 – Corky Siegel (2024 – Dawnserly)
