= Jim Schwall =

American musician (1942–2022)

- Born: November 12, 1942; Evanston, Illinois, U.S.
- Died: June 19, 2022 (aged 79) Tucson, Arizona, U.S.
- Genres: Blues, folk
- Occupations: Musician, singer-songwriter
- Instruments: Guitar, mandolin
- Years active: 1964–2022
- Formerly of: Siegel-Schwall Band; Jim Schwall Band

Jim Schwall (November 12, 1942 – June 19, 2022) was an American musician, singer-songwriter, and photographer. He was best known as a co-founder and member of the Siegel-Schwall Band.

== Musical career ==
Jim Schwall was born in Evanston, Illinois. A singer-songwriter, he played guitar, as well as mandolin, bass guitar, accordion, and other instruments. He studied music at Roosevelt University. There he met Corky Siegel, and became interested in electric blues music. Schwall and Siegel formed a blues duo in 1964, playing at Chicago bars and clubs. They performed regularly at Pepper's Lounge and at Big John's, where well known, established blues musicians such as Muddy Waters, Howlin' Wolf, and Willie Dixon would often sit in. The duo expanded to a quartet and became the Siegel-Schwall Band. Schwall's amplified Gibson B-25 acoustic guitar was a distinctive component of the band's sound.

The Siegel-Schwall Band became quite popular, and by 1967 were touring nationally, performing at large venues like the Fillmore West and sharing the bill with well-known rock bands. Between 1966 and 1974, they released at least ten albums. They were also noted for their collaborations with Seiji Ozawa, combining blues with classical music. After 1974, they disbanded, but the band re-formed in 1987. They played occasional live dates and released two albums of new material over the following decade.

Schwall was also the leader of his own blues-rock band, the Jim Schwall Band. This band formed in the mid-1970s, and versions continued playing live on an intermittent basis into the 2000s.

Schwall was also involved in numerous other musical projects. He played guitar and accordion in the band So Dang Yang, and was the bassist for the Cajun Strangers. He earned a Doctor of Musical Arts (D.M.A.) degree in Music Composition from the University of Wisconsin–Madison School of Music in 1994, submitting his composition Triptych: Dance Music in Three Acts for Eleven Players in partial fulfillment for the requirements for the degree. He taught music at the college level. As a composer, he specialized in ballet, opera, and other music for the stage.

== Photography ==
Schwall was also a professional photographer, and did different types of photography. In his later years he worked at creating art prints that combined human figures and natural landscapes. He sometimes used 19th-century photographic techniques such as kallitype, cyanotype, and gum printing, non-silver techniques that predate the gelatin silver process.

== Political activism ==
Schwall was active in progressive political causes. In 2002 he ran for mayor of Madison, Wisconsin.

== Writing ==
After retiring and settling in Tucson, Schwall took to writing. At the urging of friends, he wrote a memoir titled "My So-called Career(s)" still unpublished, and was working on a novel tentatively titled "Organ Pipe Incident."

== Discography ==
For Schwall's recordings with the Siegel-Schwall Band, see Siegel-Schwall Band.

=== Albums ===
- A Wedding Present from Jim and Cherie Schwall – Jim and Cherie Schwall (private pressing, 1973)
- Spring Vacation – The Jim Schwall Band
- Growing Old – Jim Schwall
- Piñata – So Dang Yang [EP]
- Cajun Country Ramble – The Cajun Strangers
- Short Stories – Jim Schwall (Waterbug Records, 2010)
- Bar Time Lovers – Jim Schwall (Conundrum InterArts, 2014)

=== Singles ===
- "Mr. Monster" / "Don't Drive When You've Been Drinking" – The Jim Schwall Band (Dynamic Voice, 1976)
