= The Wild Party (1975 film) =

1975 film by James Ivory

- Film poster
- Directed by: James Ivory
- Screenplay by: Walter Marks
- Based on: The Wild Party by Joseph Moncure March
- Produced by: Ismail Merchant
- Starring: James Coco; Raquel Welch; Perry King; Tiffany Bolling; Royal Dano; David Dukes
- Cinematography: Walter Lassally
- Music by: Walter Marks
- Production company: The Wild Party
- Distributed by: American International Pictures
- Release dates: May 9, 1975 (Washington, D.C.)
- Running time: 91 minutes
- Country: United States
- Language: English
- Budget: $900,000

The Wild Party is a 1975 American comedy-drama film directed by James Ivory and produced by Ismail Merchant for Merchant Ivory Productions. Loosely based on Joseph Moncure March's narrative poem of the same name, the screenplay is written by Walter Marks, who also composed the score. The plot follows an aging silent movie comic star of the 1920s named Jolly Grimm (James Coco) attempts a comeback by staging a party to show his new film.

Shot in Riverside, California, the poem was also made into two musicals, a Broadway show, composed by Michael John LaChiusa, which followed the poem very closely, and an off-Broadway production, composed by Andrew Lippa, which took some artistic liberties but still less than this film.

A dance scene was choreographed by Patricia Birch.

== Plot ==
The year is 1929 and sound films are arriving. Once a great star of the silent era, Jolly Grimm has wealth, a mansion, a manservant, Tex, and a beautiful and faithful mistress, Queenie, but no longer Hollywood's interest. He desperately tries to get studio executives interested in his self-financed latest project, so he decides to throw a huge party at his house and show the film footage to the attendees.

The party turns into a loud, alcohol-fueled orgy. Jolly is unable to impress a Hollywood mogul, eager to move on to a more important social engagement, with the outdated humor and pathos of his work. The more he drinks, the more angry Jolly becomes. The arrival of an underage girl brings out a protective, possibly perverted interest on Jolly's part, while the attention paid to Queenie by virile young actor Dale Sword ignites a jealous fury in the sad comic that leads to violence and tragedy.

== Cast ==
- James Coco as Jolly Grimm
- Raquel Welch as Queenie
- Perry King as Dale Sword
- David Dukes as James Morrison
- Tiffany Bolling as Kate
- Mews Small as Bertha
- Royal Dano as Tex
- Paul Barresi as the Bartender
- Annette Ferra as Nadine Jones

== Production ==
=== Development ===
The script was based on Joseph Moncure March's 1926 narrative poem about a party given by a vaudeville comic in his walk-up apartment in Greenwich Village. Lyricist-composer Walter Marks thought the poem might make the basis for a musical film, and decided to write a film adaptation, which relocated the action to Hollywood at the end of the silent-movie era. Marks took the project to Edgar Lansbury and Joseph Beruh, producers of Broadway musicals such as Godspell and they agreed to executive produce. Lansbury thought the poem was so "wildly unconventional" it was only worth making with a budget of $200,000, "as an experiment in which the risks were minimised".

Marks' brother Peter introduced Marks to director James Ivory and producer Ismail Merchant, who had just made Savages. As fans, Lansbury and Beruh hired Ivory and Merchant. After Ivory became involved, the film stopped being a musical and became a drama with music. Fatty Arbuckle was an inspiration for the main character.

Lansbury says "as we worked on it, the project sort of gathered momentum." Raquel Welch agreed to play the female lead and the budget expanded. The film was financed by American International Pictures which normally specialised in exploitation films. Studio president Samuel Z. Arkoff said AIP usually made movies for the "Woolworths line" but admitted with this film, the company was "going to add a higher line" and that it was a "wildly artistic film".

=== Casting ===
James Coco was cast in the lead. "There isn't anything I don't get to do and that's terribly appealing to any actor", said Coco. "It's full, fleshed out. And part of it is silent. I get to do love scenes with Raquel, I don't get that opportunity too often. I usually get the mule. She isn't what I expected. She's small. She's very serious, an organic actor and I love that. We have a marvelous relationship."

=== Filming ===
Filming started on 29 April 1974 at the Riverside Mission Inn in California. Shooting took five weeks. Ivory said the inn was chosen because "it's typical of the palatial, beautifully rococo architecture of the period."

"Raquel Welch was a very, very difficult actress to work with", said Ivory. "She fired the cameraman, she fired Ismail, she would have fired [co-star] Perry King...and it was our film!... I did not enjoy making The Wild Party."

Welch demanded that the cinematographer Walter Lassally be fired after he made an "impertinent" remark to her. She also wanted Ivory fired and replaced as director by her then boyfriend Ron Talsky. The Directors Guild became involved and threatening letters were sent to Welch. Filming continued.

"She's very insecure when she's working", said Lansbury.

Ivory later said "the egos and temper tantrums in the heat of May and June, the large crowds of extras, the festering atmosphere reminded me of working among those tempestuous movie stars in Bombay."

=== Post-production ===
Two test screenings in Santa Barbara and San Diego in late January-early February 1975 went badly; the Santa Barbara preview audience consisting mostly of University of California students reported liking the orgy and fight scenes but hated Perry King and the new "serious" Raquel Welch, while the San Diego audience of mainly middle-class people had the exact opposite reaction. Unsure about how to handle the contradictory results, AIP heavily re-edited the film. "They did more than recut it", said Ivory. "They turned it upside down and they distributed two versions. I never knew which is being shown." There was talk within the company of showing one version in cities and the other in small towns.

Ivory said the main changes were softening Coco's character, adding discarded sex scenes, and introducing flashbacks and flashforwards. Ivory wrote that the "patched-together remnants" of the film "proves once more that you cannot effectively re-edit a picture and change its character in order to 'save' it." While Lansbury, Beruh and Marks approved the re-cut, Welch hated it. Stanzas from the source poem are read in a narrative voice-over by actor David Dukes during the film. "It's a simple, linear story but I think the poem adds a dimension to it", said Lansbury. "It is literary and it has the various textures of a mosaic."

== Release and reception ==
Contrary to Ivory's wishes to get a New York City premiere (where he expected it to gain a following) as quickly as possible, the film instead premiered in Washington, D.C., and then made its way to Denver and Boston. Reviews in the early cities were terrible and box office performance poor, and the film didn't get a theatrical release in New York until 1981.

Variety published a fairly positive review, calling the film "overly talky" but "a magnificent showpiece for Coco's talents. He successfully covers a spectrum from silly comedy, warm humor, sober anger, maddening frustration and drunken psychosis. Holding her own as his mistress is Raquel Welch, registering very strongly." Other reviews were much more negative. Vincent Canby of The New York Times wrote, "The movie often looks very good ... but the script is, I think, really terrible. Never do Mr. Ivory, Mr. Coco, Miss Welch and the others discover the proper way to play it, probably because it's unplayable." Charles Champlin of the Los Angeles Times stated, "It is impossible to know exactly what Merchant, Ivory and scriptwriter Walter Marks had in mind for 'The Wild Party.' It is too simple-minded to be taken seriously but too earnest to work as a piece of campy nostalgia." Gene Siskel of the Chicago Tribune gave the film 1 star out of 4 and noted in a brief review that "Collectors of trash movies" might want to catch it while it played town. Gary Arnold of The Washington Post wrote that the film "can be recommended with a fairly clear conscience to connoisseurs of bad movies, but anyone looking for a serious night's entertainment will have only himself to blame. Although it's never as energetically, uproariously preposterous as The Carpetbaggers and The Oscar, the most diverting stinkers of the '60s, The Wild Party gives it the old college try." Jonathan Rosenbaum of The Monthly Film Bulletin stated that "it is difficult to imagine how even the longer versions of the film could overcome the formidable handicap of a miscast James Coco, an actor well-suited to the broad overkill of recent Preminger but quite inadequate for the emotional range and shading of a tragi-comic silent star." Rosenbaum did go on to state, however, "The songs and musical numbers are particularly delightful."

The film was a financial flop. Ivory thought a problem, apart from the re-editing, was that the audience could not identify with any of the characters. "I think its mixed style – part musical, part melodrama, part character piece – would have gone down better if the audience could have entered more into those characters' lives."

After the film's original release in 1975, other versions varying in length resurfaced on VHS and DVD, as well as a director's cut, 20 minutes longer, briefly released to French cinemas in 1976 and US cinemas in 1981.

The film was banned in the United Kingdom until 1982, when the BBFC gave it a "18" rating.
