= Mandy Patinkin =

American actor and singer (born 1952)

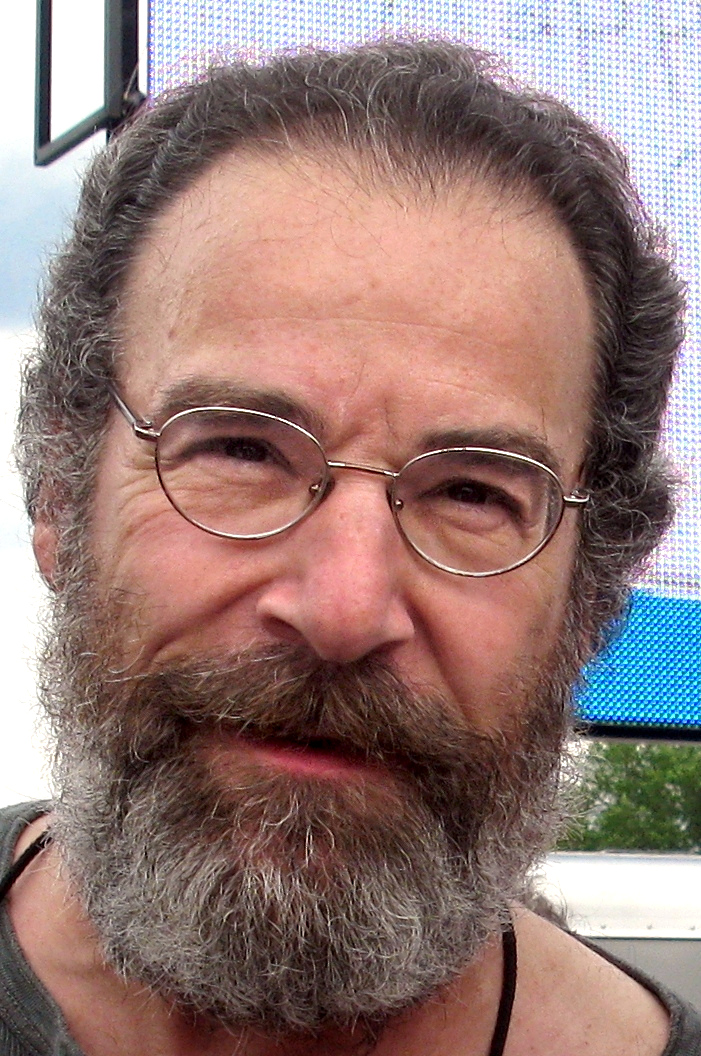
- Patinkin in 2008
- Born: Mandel Bruce Patinkin; November 30, 1952 (age 73); Chicago, Illinois, U.S.
- Education: University of Kansas; Juilliard School
- Occupations: Actor; singer
- Years active: 1974–present
- Known for: Homeland; The Princess Bride; Sunday in the Park with George
- Spouse: Kathryn Grody (m. 1980)
- Children: 2
- Website: www.mandypatinkin.org

Mandel Bruce "Mandy" Patinkin (/pəˈtɪŋkɪn/; born November 30, 1952) is an American actor and singer in musical theatre, television, and film. As a Broadway performer, he has collaborated with Stephen Sondheim and Andrew Lloyd Webber.

Patinkin made his theatre debut in 1975 starring opposite Meryl Streep in the revival of the comic play Trelawny of the "Wells" at The Public Theater's Shakespeare Festival. He played Che in the first Broadway production of Andrew Lloyd Webber's Evita (1979), earning a Tony Award for Best Featured Actor in a Musical, as well as the roles of Georges Seurat/George in Stephen Sondheim's Sunday in the Park with George (1984), for which he was nominated for the Tony Award for Best Actor in a Musical. He portrayed Lord Archibald Craven in the original Broadway cast of Lucy Simon's The Secret Garden (1991). Patinkin replaced Michael Rupert as Marvin in William Finn's Falsettos (1993) on Broadway. He starred as Burrs in The Wild Party (2000) and earned a second nomination for the Tony Award for Best Actor in a Musical.

Patinkin had starring roles in television shows, playing Dr. Jeffrey Geiger in Chicago Hope (1994–2000); SSA Jason Gideon in the CBS crime-drama series Criminal Minds (2005–2007); Saul Berenson in the Showtime drama series Homeland (2011–2020); and Rufus Cotesworth in the Hulu mystery series Death and Other Details (2024). For his work on television he has earned seven Primetime Emmy Award nominations, winning Outstanding Leading Actor in a Drama Series for Chicago Hope in 1995. He was also a main cast member in Dead Like Me (2003–2004) and The Good Fight (2021).

His film roles include Inigo Montoya in Rob Reiner's family adventure film The Princess Bride (1987) and Avigdor in Barbra Streisand's musical epic Yentl (1983) for which he earned a Golden Globe Award for Best Actor in a Motion Picture Musical or Comedy nomination. Other film credits include Ragtime (1981); Maxie (1985); Dick Tracy (1990); True Colors (1991); Impromptu (1991); Wonder (2017); and Life Itself (2018). Patinkin also voiced roles in Hayao Miyazaki's Castle in the Sky (2003) and The Wind Rises (2013).

== Early life and education ==
Mandel Bruce Patinkin, known as Mandy, was born in Chicago, Illinois, on November 30, 1952, to Doris Lee "Doralee" (née Sinton) (1925–2014), a homemaker, and Lester Don Patinkin (1919–1972), who operated two large Chicago-area metal factories, the People's Iron & Metal Company and the Scrap Corporation of America. Patinkin grew up in an upper-middle-class family, descended from Jewish immigrants from Poland, and was raised in Conservative Judaism, attending religious school daily from the age of seven to 13 or 14 and singing in synagogue choirs, as well as attending Camp Sura in Michigan. His father died of pancreatic cancer in 1972. His mother wrote Grandma Doralee Patinkin's Jewish Family Cookbook. Patinkin's cousins include Mark Patinkin, an author and nationally syndicated columnist for The Providence Journal; Sheldon Patinkin of Columbia College Chicago's theater department, a founder of The Second City; Bonnie Miller Rubin, a Chicago Tribune reporter; Laura Patinkin, a New York–based actress; Louis Rosen, a New York–based composer; Stacy Oliver (née Patinkin), a writer and performer, and Madeleine Patinkin, a young musical theatre vocalist.

He attended South Shore High School, Harvard St. George School, and Kenwood High School (later renamed Kenwood Academy, where his teachers included Lena McLin), and graduated in 1970. He attended the University of Kansas and the Juilliard School (Drama Division Group 5: 1972–1976). At Juilliard, he was a classmate of Kelsey Grammer. When the producers of the sitcom Cheers were holding auditions for the role of Frasier Crane, Patinkin put Grammer's name forward.

== Career ==
=== 1974–1988: Breakthrough and stardom ===
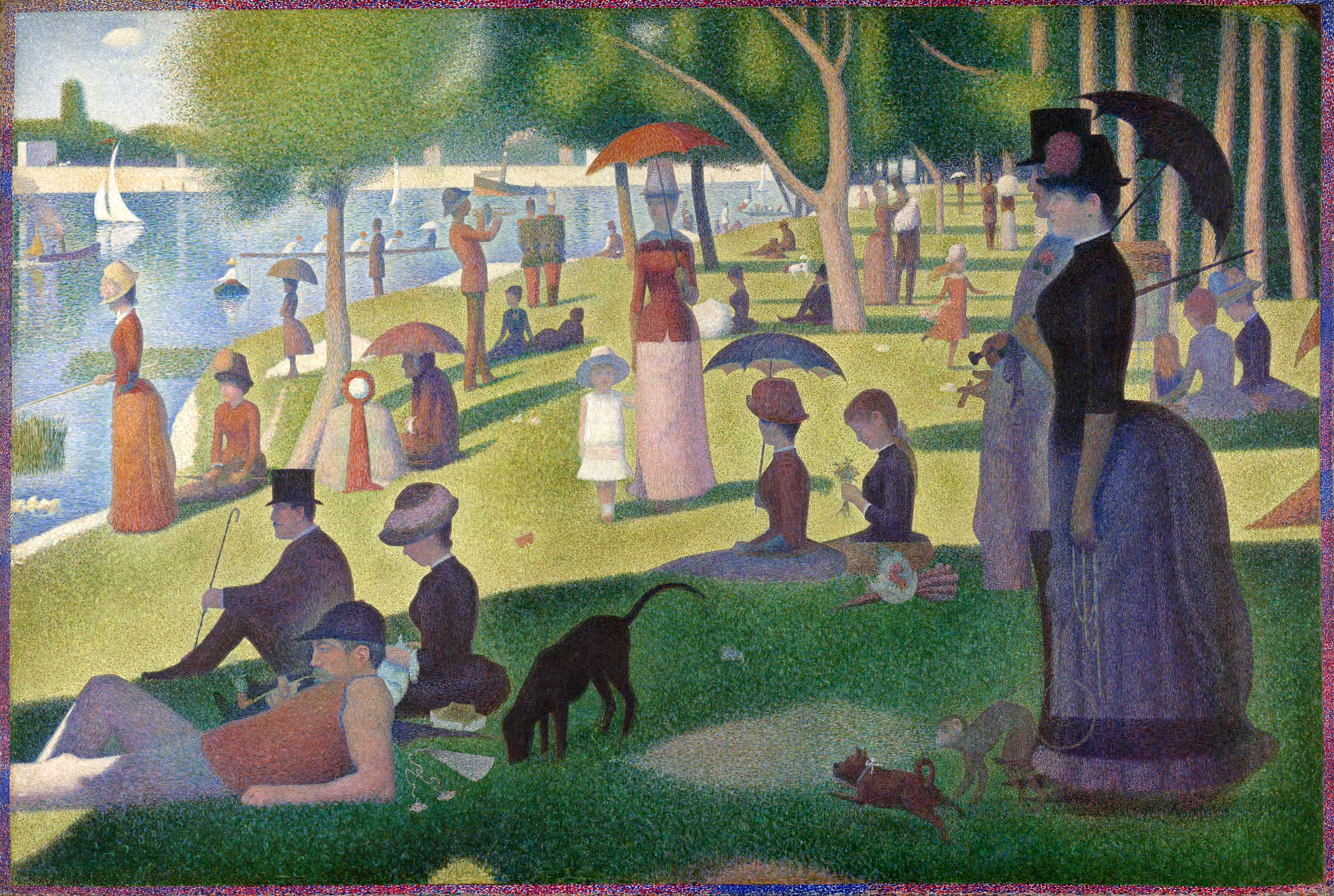
Patinkin starred in Stephen Sondheim's Broadway musical Sunday in the Park with George (1984) based on Georges Seurat's painting A Sunday Afternoon on the Island of La Grande Jatte

After some television-commercial and radio appearances (including on CBS Radio Mystery Theater in 1974); Patinkin started his career on the New York stage in 1975, starring in Trelawny of the 'Wells' as Arthur Gower. Patinkin starred alongside Meryl Streep, who played Imogen Parrott, and John Lithgow, who played Ferdinand Gadd. Clive Barnes of The New York Times praised the production writing, "The production looks beautiful and, indeed, still charms". From 1975 through 1976, Patinkin played the Player King and Fortinbras, Prince of Norway in a Broadway revival of Hamlet, with Sam Waterston in the leading role. In 1977 he starred in the play The Shadow Box written by Michael Cristofer. He had his first film role as a Pool Man in the political comedy The Big Fix (1978) starring Richard Dreyfus, John Lithgow, and F. Murray Abraham. The following year he acted in the coming of age romantic comedy French Postcards and the neo-noir Last Embrace.

Patinkin had his first success in musical theater when he starred as Che in Andrew Lloyd Webber's Evita, opposite Patti LuPone, on Broadway in 1979. Walter Kerr of The New York Times described his performance as "vigorous". James Lardner of The Washington Post wrote, "Patinkin gives a sympathetic, consistent and rather sweet performance". Patinkin won the Tony Award for Best Featured Actor in a Musical for his performance. He also received a nomination for the Drama Desk Award for Outstanding Actor in a Musical. Patinkin took film roles in Milos Forman's historical drama Ragtime (1980) playing Tateh and Sidney Lumet's drama Daniel (1983) portraying Paul Isaacson.

Patinkin won acclaim for his role as an Orthodox Jewish man Avigdor in Barbra Streisand's romantic drama epic Yentl (1983), which earned him a nomination for the Golden Globe Award for Best Actor – Motion Picture Musical or Comedy. Richard Corliss of Time praised his performance but criticized Streisand's choice to not have him sing in the film. Corliss wrote, "For her male co-star she hired Mandy Patinkin, who has wrapped his crystalline Broadway tenor voice around Stephen Sondheim and Andrew Lloyd Webber, then gave him no songs to sing". Veron Scott of United Press International wrote, "When Patinkin is in a scene it is difficult to focus on anyone else, including Streisand who is at her very best in Yentl. He plays profound, passionate men of action." Patinkin noted that both Ragtime (1981) and Daniel (1983) weren't as successful as he had hoped commercially and critically saying, "When you care about the content of a film, you want people to see it". He stated he had a positive experience working with Streisand saying, "'She tried to overcome her superstardom to make me feel comfortable. She worked hard to get to know me for what I am." Patinkin also was able to explore his Jewish roots while making the film saying, "I also spent a couple of weeks in Ohr Semach in Jerusalem at a yeshiva, studying the Talmud and attending lectures. The experience awakened many thoughts and feelings that had been sleeping in me for some time."

Patinkin returned to Broadway to star in Stephen Sondheim and James Lapine's Pulitzer Prize-winning musical Sunday in the Park with George, in which he played the pointillist artist Georges Seurat and his fictional great-grandson George. Performances began in April 1984 and he starred opposite Bernadette Peters. Patinkin earned nominations for a Tony Award for Best Actor in a Musical and a Drama Desk Award for Outstanding Actor in a Musical. Frank Rich of The New York Times wrote, "Seurat, here embodied commandingly by Mandy Patinkin, could well be a stand-in for Mr. Sondheim, who brings the same fierce, methodical intellectual precision to musical and verbal composition that the artist brought to his pictorial realm." Patinkin left the show on September 17 and was replaced by Robert Westenberg. He returned to the show on August 5, 1985, until the show closed two months later. His performance was captured on film and shown on television as a part of American Playhouse. The following year he took the role of Buddy Plummer in Follies: In Concert at Lincoln Center.

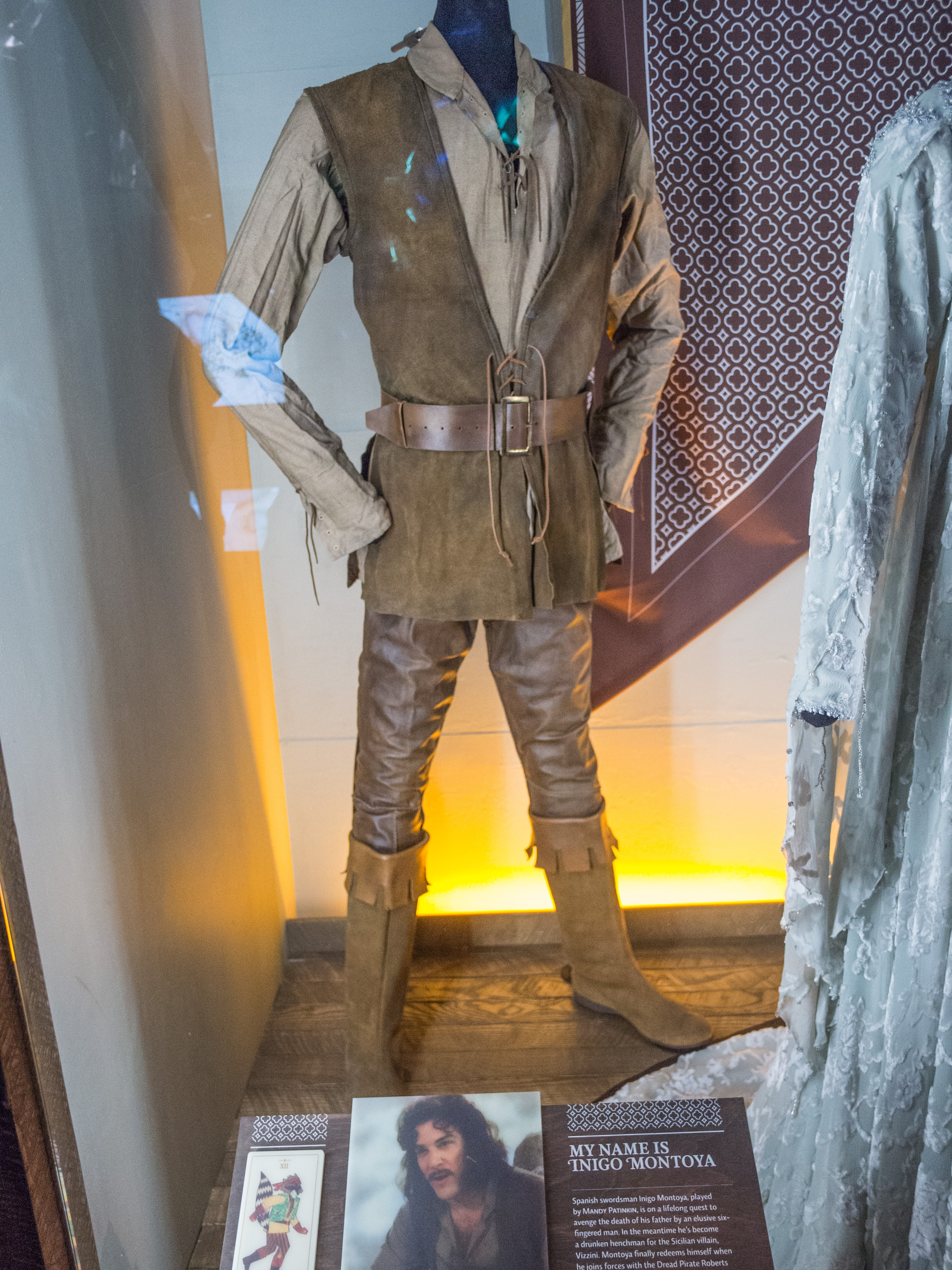
Patinkin's costume for Inigo Montoya from The Princess Bride (1987)

In 1985 Patinkin took a leading role in the romantic fantasy comedy Maxie opposite Glenn Close. Variety gave the film a mixed review but praised Patinkin, writing, "Much of the credit for keeping [Maxie] alive must go to Mandy Patinkin, who shows himself to be a good-looking leading man with a rare light touch for romantic comedy." In 1987, Patinkin played Inigo Montoya in Rob Reiner's The Princess Bride, playing the role of the best swordsman in the country, looking to avenge his father's death. Patinkin acted opposite Cary Elwes, Robin Wright, Andre the Giant, and Billy Crystal. Variety praised his performance writing, "Patinkin especially is a joy to watch and the film comes to life when his longhaired, scruffy cavalier is on screen." His character has earned a cult following and his memorable line "My name is Inigo Montoya. You killed my father. Prepare to die," was ranked as one of IGN's best movie moments. The following year in 1988 he acted in the science fiction action film Alien Nation directed by Graham Baker and the neo-noir film The House on Carroll Street directed by Peter Yates.

=== 1989–2004: Established actor ===
Over the next decade, he continued to appear in movies, including Warren Beatty's action crime comedy Dick Tracy (1990) and Herbert Ross's political comedy True Colors (1991). He also portrayed Alfred de Musset in James Lapine's period drama Impromptu (1991) starring Hugh Grant, Judy Davis, Emma Thompson, and reunited with Bernadette Peters. Dessen Howe of The Washington Post described his performance writing "he makes an effective comic catalyst".

On Broadway, Patinkin appeared as Lord Archibald Craven opposite Rebecca Luker and Robert Westenberg in the musical The Secret Garden in 1991 and was nominated for a Drama Desk Award as Outstanding Actor in a Musical. He left the show in September of that same year and Howard McGillin took over his role. He also released two solo albums, titled Mandy Patinkin (1989) and Dress Casual (1990). In January 1993, he took over the role of Marvin from Michael Rupert in the Broadway musical Falsettos and starred opposite Barbara Walsh, Stephen Bogardus, and Chip Zien. In 1995, Patinkin sang the role of Billy Bigelow in a concert performance of Rodgers and Hammerstein's Carousel at the BBC Radio Theatre.

In 1994, Patinkin took the role of Dr. Jeffrey Geiger on CBS's Chicago Hope for which he won the Primetime Emmy Award for Outstanding Lead Actor in a Drama Series. However, despite the award and the ratings success of the show, Patinkin left the show during the second season because he was unhappy spending so much time away from his wife and children. He returned to the show in 1999 at the beginning of the sixth season, but it was canceled in 2000. Since Chicago Hope, Patinkin has appeared in a number of films. However, he has mostly performed as a singer, releasing three more albums.

During this time Patinkin guest-starred in The Simpsons in the episode "Lisa's Wedding" (1995) as Hugh Parkfield, Lisa's future English groom and in The Larry Sanders Show (1996) for which he received a nomination for the Primetime Emmy Award for Outstanding Guest Actor in a Comedy Series. He also acted in numerous films such as the drama The Doctor (1991), The Music of Chance (1993), the comedy Life with Mikey (1993), the action adventure Squanto: A Warrior's Tale (1994), and the romantic mystery Lulu on the Bridge (1998). After turning down the role in the Walt Disney Animated film The Hunchback of Notre Dame (1996), he portrayed Quasimodo in the TNT television film The Hunchback (1997) acting opposite Salma Hayek, and Richard Harris. John O'Connor from The New York Times praised his performance writing, "[Patinkin] is surprisingly restrained...His Quasimodo is a gentle and quite moving creature, shyly hiding his facial disfigurations in the shadows". Connor praised the production writing that its "oddly old-fashioned, paying a kind of homage, as does Mr. Patinkin's performance, to the Laughton film."

Mamaloshen, Patinkin's musical production of songs sung entirely in Yiddish, premiered in 1998. He has performed the show on Broadway and in venues around the United States. The recorded version won a Deutscher Schallplattenpreis award in Germany. In 1999, Patinkin co-starred in the second Sesame Street film, The Adventures of Elmo in Grouchland, as Huxley, an abusive, childish, sadistic, and greedy man with abnormally large eyebrows, who steals whatever he can grab and then claims it as his own.

Patinkin returned to Broadway in 2000 in the New York Shakespeare Festival production of Michael John LaChiusa's The Wild Party, portraying Burrs opposite Toni Collette as Queenie. The vaudeville-like production is based on the 1928 Joseph Moncure March narrative poem of the same name. For his performance he earned a nomination for the Tony Award for Best Actor in a Musical. In 2003, he dubbed a voice in the Walt Disney re-release of Hayao Miyazaki's Castle in the Sky. From 2003 to 2004, he appeared in the Showtime comedy drama Dead Like Me as Rube Sofer. In 2004, he played a six-week engagement of his one-man concert at the Off-Broadway complex Dodger Stages.

=== 2005–2020: Criminal Minds and Homeland ===
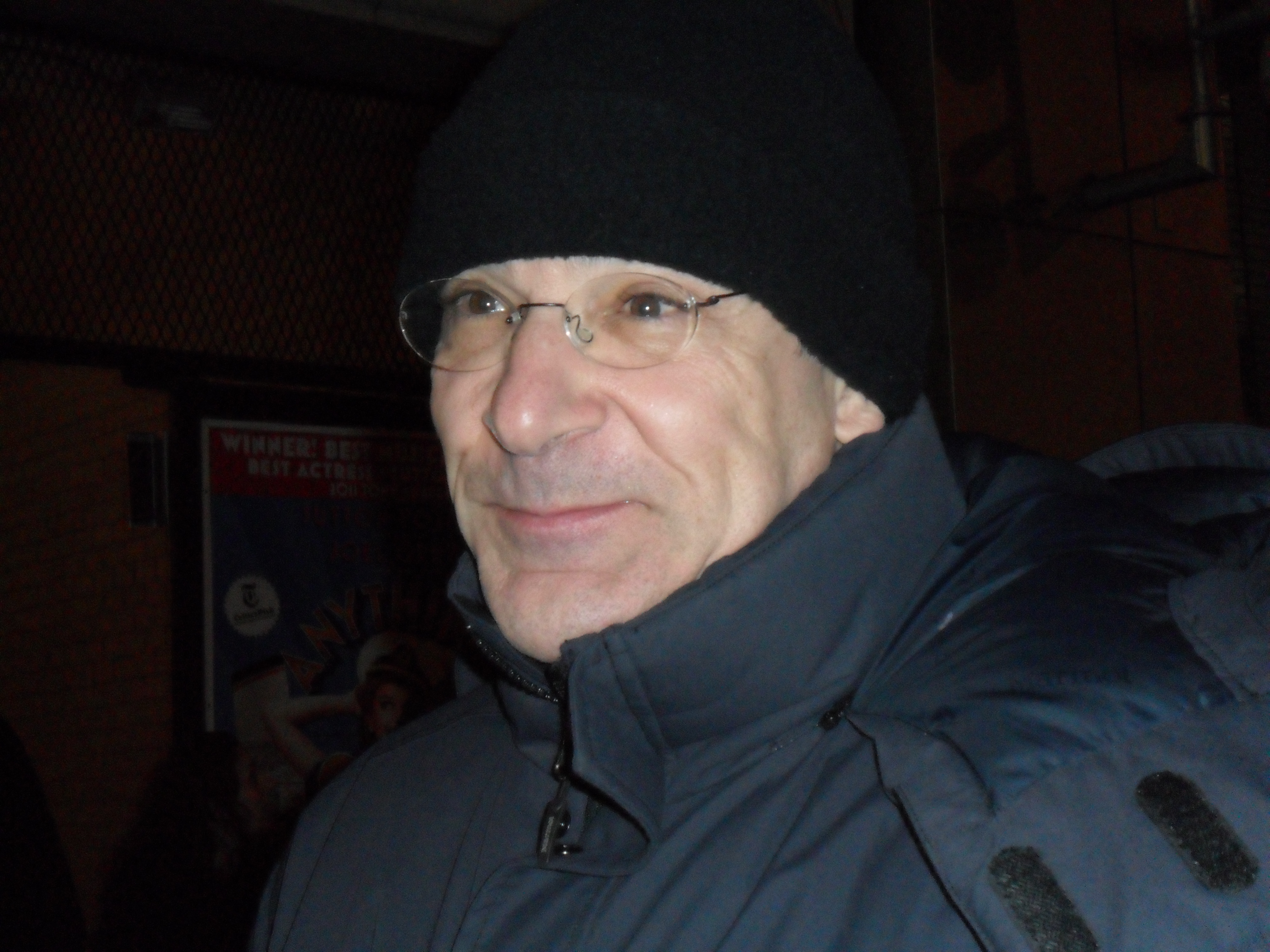
Patinkin outside the Ethel Barrymore Theatre in 2012

In September 2005, he secured the role of Jason Gideon, an experienced profiler just coming back to work after a series of nervous breakdowns, in the new CBS crime-drama television series Criminal Minds. Patinkin was absent from a table read for Criminal Minds and did not return for a third season. The departure from the show was not due to contractual or salary matters, but over creative differences. He left apologetic letters for his fellow cast members explaining his reasons and wishing them luck. Many weeks before his departure, in a videotaped interview carried in the online magazine Monaco Revue, Patinkin told journalists at the Festival de Télévision de Monte-Carlo that he loathed violence on television and was uncomfortable with certain scenes in Criminal Minds. He later called his choice to do Criminal Minds his "biggest public mistake" and stated that he "thought it was something very different. I never thought they were going to kill and rape all these women every night, every day, week after week, year after year. It was very destructive to my soul and my personality. After that, I didn't think I would get to work in television again."

Patinkin spoke of having planned to tour the world with a musical and wanting to inject more comedy into the entertainment business. In later episodes of Criminal Minds, during the 2007–08 season, Jason Gideon was written out of the series and replaced by Special Agent David Rossi (played by Joe Mantegna). Gideon was later officially killed off, ending all chances of a guest appearance by Patinkin on the show. In 2008, Patinkin portrayed Prospero in an off-Broadway musical production of The Tempest opposite Elisabeth Waterston and Michael Potts. Marilyn Stasio of Variety wrote, "Patinkin has a beautiful voice, as warm and golden as honey spooned from a jar -- the perfect voice to sing us through "The Tempest," the most musical of Shakespeare's late plays." On October 14, 2009, it was announced that Patinkin would be a guest star on an episode of Three Rivers, which aired on November 15, 2009. He played a patient with Lou Gehrig's disease injured in a car accident who asks the doctors at Three Rivers Hospital to take him off life support so his organs can be donated. He filmed an appearance on The Whole Truth that had been scheduled to air December 15, 2010, but ABC pulled the series from its schedule two weeks prior. That same year he acted in the British crime drama 4.3.2.1. (2010) acting opposite Emma Roberts, Tamsin Egerton, and Helen McCrory.

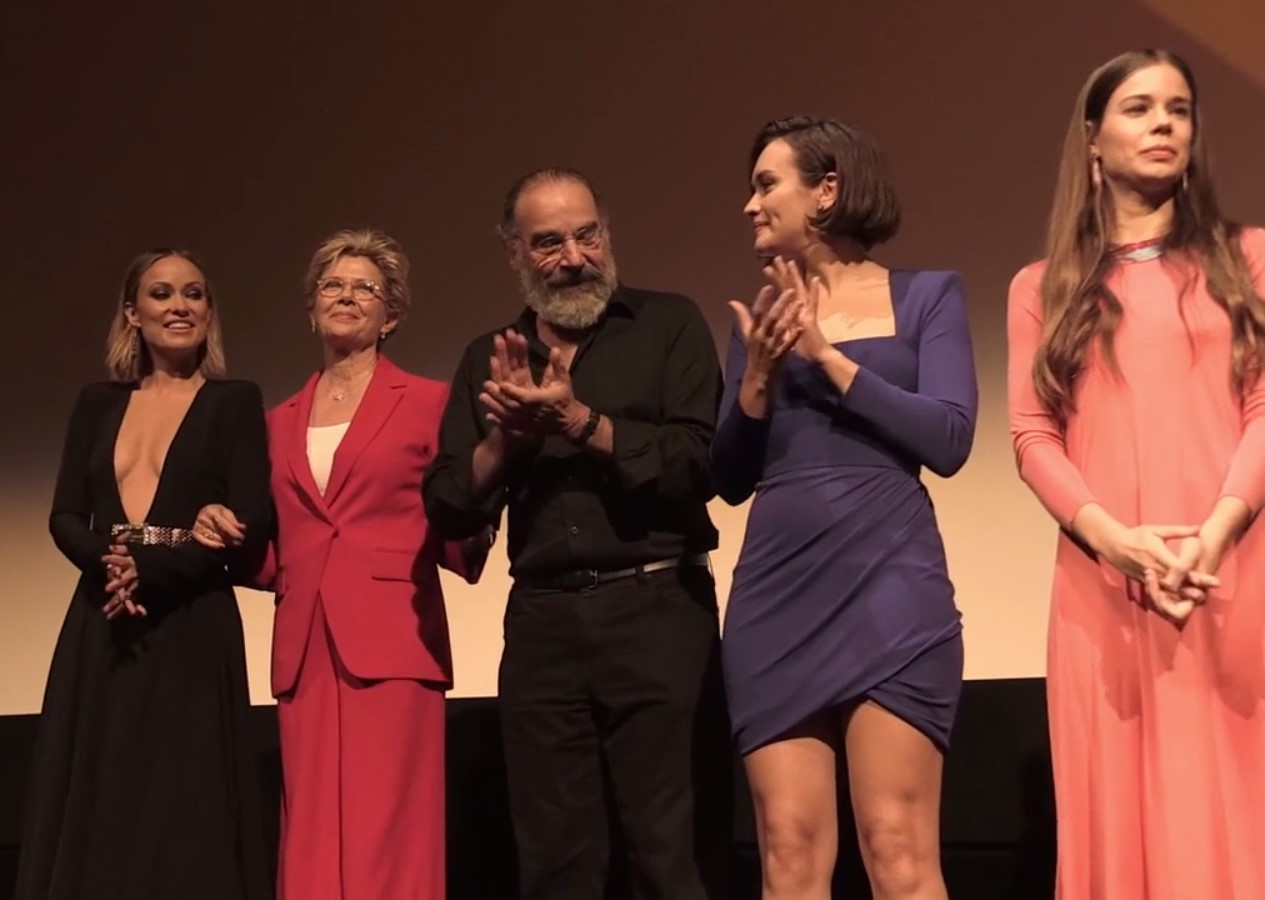
Olivia Wilde, Annette Bening, Patinkin, and Olivia Cooke at the TIFF in 2018

He starred in the new musical Paradise Found, co-directed by Harold Prince and Susan Stroman, at the Menier Chocolate Factory in London. The musical played a limited engagement from May 2010 through June 26, 2010. Patinkin and Patti LuPone performed their concert An Evening with Patti LuPone and Mandy Patinkin on Broadway for a limited 63-performance run starting November 21, 2011, at the Ethel Barrymore Theatre, and ending on January 13, 2012. The concert marked the first time the pair had performed together on Broadway since appearing in Evita.

He costarred with Claire Danes on the Showtime series Homeland, which aired from 2011 until 2020. He portrayed counterterrorism operative Saul Berenson, protagonist Carrie Mathison's (Danes) mentor. For his performance, Patinkin was nominated for a Golden Globe Award for Best Supporting Actor – Series, Miniseries or Television Film and an Primetime Emmy Award for Outstanding Supporting Actor in a Drama Series, among other honors. Explaining what he learned from the character, he stated, "The line between good and evil runs through each one of us."

Patinkin was announced as playing the role of Pierre Bezukhov in the Broadway musical Natasha, Pierre & The Great Comet of 1812 starting August 15, 2017. He was to have a limited run through September 3, replacing former Hamilton star Okieriete Onaodowan, but Patinkin dropped out of the role before performing. His stint was filled in for by the show's Pierre standby Scott Stangland and creator of the musical Dave Malloy. In 2018, Patinkin returned to recorded music with the album Diary: January 27, 2018 which was produced by pianist Thomas Bartlett. He voiced Papa Smurf in the live-action comedy film Smurfs: The Lost Village (2017) opposite Demi Lovato, Rainn Wilson, and Julia Roberts. During this time he also took roles in the animated film The Wind Rises (2013), the comedy-drama Wish I Was Here (2014), the family film Wonder (2017), the drama Life Itself (2018), and the comedy Before You Know It (2019).

=== 2021–present ===
In 2021 he was part of the main cast of the legal drama series The Good Fight on CBS. The following year he voiced Benjamin Franklin in the Ken Burns documentary series Benjamin Franklin on PBS. Also in 2022, Patinkin was the narrator of the miniseries Indivisible: Healing Hate, a Paramount+ show documenting the events that led to the January 6 United States Capitol attack.

In 2024, Patinkin starred as Rufus Cotesworth, a renowned former detective, now heading private security for a business family, in ABC Studios' TV series Death and Other Details.

In January 2026, he was cast as the Norse god Odin for the upcoming Amazon Prime Video live-action adaptation of the two Norse mythology-based video games in the God of War series.

== Activism and politics ==
In May 2012, Patinkin delivered the opening speech at the Annual Convention of the Israeli Left, where he recounted his experiences during a visit to the West Bank with members of the Breaking the Silence organization.

On December 21, 2015, on Charlie Rose on PBS, Patinkin spoke about his recent trip to Greece to help refugees from war-torn Syria and his acting role in the television series Homeland. He stated that he wanted to help "create opportunity and better systems of living and existing, to give freedom, justice and dignity, quality of life to humanity all over the world."

In 2020, Grody and Patinkin partnered with Swing Left, creating viral videos with their sons to encourage people to vote for Joe Biden in the 2020 United States presidential election. Patinkin also stumped for Biden in an ad for the Jewish Democratic Council of America encouraging Jews to vote for Biden. The ad featured Patinkin channeling his Princess Bride character to encourage people to vote.

In a July 2025 New York Times interview with his wife Grody, Patinkin was critical of Israeli Prime Minister Benjamin Netanyahu's policies during the Gaza War, arguing that his actions are "endangering the Jewish population all over the world" and that "to watch what is happening, for the Jewish people to allow this to happen to children and civilians of all ages in Gaza, for whatever reason, is unconscionable and unthinkable."

In late October 2025, Patinkin endorsed Zohran Mamdani for mayor of New York City. He also sang (with the PS22 Chorus) at Mayor Mamdani's inauguration ceremony.

== Personal life ==
Patinkin married actress and writer Kathryn Grody on April 15, 1980. They have two sons.

Patinkin has described himself as "Jewish with a dash of Buddhist" belief. On the Canadian radio program Q, Patinkin called himself a "JewBu" because of this mix of beliefs and "spiritual but not religious".

Patinkin suffered from keratoconus, a progressive eye condition, in the mid-1990s. This led to two corneal transplants, his right cornea in 1997 and his left in 1998. He was also diagnosed with and treated for prostate cancer in 2004. He celebrated his first year of recovery in 2005 by doing a 265-mile (426 km) charity bike ride.

Patinkin has been involved in a variety of Jewish causes and cultural activities. He sings in Yiddish, often in concert, and on his album Mamaloshen. He also wrote introductions for two books on Jewish culture, The Jewish American Family Album, by Dorothy and Thomas Hoobler, and Grandma Doralee Patinkin's Holiday Cookbook: A Jewish Family's Celebrations, by his mother, Doralee Patinkin Rubin.

Patinkin contributed to the children's book Dewey Doo-it Helps Owlie Fly Again: A Musical Storybook, inspired by Christopher Reeve. The award-winning book, published in 2005, benefits the Christopher Reeve Foundation and includes an audio CD with Patinkin singing and reading the story as well as Dana Reeve and Bernadette Peters singing.

In 2020, Patinkin's and Grody's son, Gideon, began filming and photographing their daily lives, posting images and clips to multiple social media outlets. In 2023, they began a series of live stage events, "A Conversation with Mandy Patinkin and Kathryn Grody".

Patinkin is a model railroader.

== Filmography ==
=== Film ===
Year	Title	Role	Director	Notes
1978	The Big Fix	Pool Man	Jeremy Kagan	
1979	French Postcards	Sayyid	Willard Huyck	
1979	Last Embrace	First Commuter	Jonathan Demme	
1980	Night of the Juggler	Allesandro, The Cabbie	Robert Butler	
1981	Ragtime	Tateh	Miloš Forman	
1983	Yentl	Avigdor	Barbra Streisand	
1983	Daniel	Paul Isaacson	Sidney Lumet	
1985	Maxie	Nick Cheyney	Paul Aaron	
1987	The Princess Bride	Inigo Montoya	Rob Reiner	
1988	Alien Nation	Sam Francisco	Graham Baker	
1988	The House on Carroll Street	Ray Salwen	Peter Yates	
1990	Dick Tracy	88 Keys	Warren Beatty	
1991	True Colors	John Palmeri	Herbert Ross	
1991	Impromptu	Alfred de Musset	James Lapine	
1991	The Doctor	Dr. Murray Kaplan	Randa Haines	
1993	The Music of Chance	Jim Nashe	Philip Haas	
1993	Life with Mikey	Irate Man	James Lapine	
1994	Squanto: A Warrior's Tale	Brother Daniel	Xavier Koller	
1998	Lulu on the Bridge	Philip Kleinman	Paul Auster	
1998	Men with Guns	Andrew	John Sayles	
1999	The Adventures of Elmo in Grouchland	Huxley	Gary Halvorson	
2001	Piñero	Joseph Papp	Leon Ichaso	
2002	Run Ronnie Run	Himself	Troy Miller	
2003	Castle in the Sky	Louie	Hayao Miyazaki	English dubbing
2006	Choking Man	Rick	Steve Barron	
2006	Everyone's Hero	Stanley Irving	Christopher Reeve	Voice role
2010	4.3.2.1.	Jago Larofsky	Noel Clarke	
2011	Jock the Hero Dog	Basil	Duncan MacNeillie	Voice role
2013	The Wind Rises	Hattori	Hayao Miyazaki	English dubbing
2014	Wish I Was Here	Gabe Bloom	Zach Braff	
2016	Ali and Nino	Duke Kipiani	Asif Kapadia	
2016	The Queen of Spain	Jordan Berman	Fernando Trueba	
2017	Smurfs: The Lost Village	Papa Smurf	Kelly Asbury	Voice role
2017	Wonder	Mr. Tushman	Stephen Chbosky	
2018	Life Itself	Irwin Dempsey	Dan Fogelman	
2018	André the Giant	Himself	Jason Hehir	Documentary
2019	Before You Know It	Mel Gurner	Hannah Pearl Utt	
2023	The Magician's Elephant	Vilna Lutz	Wendy Rogers	Voice role
TBA	November 1963 †	Tony Accardo	Roland Joffé	Post-production

=== Television ===
Year	Title	Role	Notes
1977	Charleston	Beaudine Croft	Television movie
1978	That Thing on ABC	Performer	Television movie
1978	Taxi	Alan	Episode: "Memories of Cab 804 (Part 2)"
1986	American Playhouse	Georges Seurat / George	Episode: "Sunday in the Park with George"
1986	Follies in Concert	Buddy Plummer	Television special
1994–2000	Chicago Hope	Dr. Jeffrey Geiger	60 episodes
1994	Picket Fences	Dr. Jeffrey Geiger	Episode: "Rebels with Causes"
1994	Some Enchanted Evening: Celebrating Oscar Hammerstein II	Performer	Television special
1995	The Simpsons	Hugh Parkfield	Voice role, Episode: "Lisa's Wedding"
1995	The Larry Sanders Show	Himself	Episode: "Eight"
1996	Broken Glass	Dr. Harry Hyman	Television movie
1997	The Hunchback	Quasimodo	Television movie
1999	Strange Justice	Kenneth Duberstein	Television movie
2001	Touched by an Angel	Satan	Episode: "Netherlands"
2001	Boston Public	Isaac Rice	Episode: "Chapter Twenty-Two"
2003	Law & Order	Levi March	Episode: "Absentia"
2003–2004	Dead Like Me	Rube Sofer	29 episodes
2004	NTSB: The Crash of Flight 323	Al Cummings	Television movie
2005–2007	Criminal Minds	Jason Gideon	47 episodes
2009	Three Rivers	Victor	Episode: "The Luckiest Man"
2010	Sondheim! The Birthday Concert	Performer	Television special
2011	Wonder Pets!	Groundhog	Voice; Episode: "Help the Groundhog!"
2011–2020	Homeland	Saul Berenson	96 episodes
2015	Nina's World	Mr. Lambert	Voice; Episode: "Nina's Library Hop"
2018	Hal Prince: A Director's Life	Performer	Television special
2021	The Good Fight	Hal Wackner	8 episodes
2021	Finding Your Roots	Himself	Episode: "On Broadway"
2022	Benjamin Franklin	Benjamin Franklin	Voice; 2 episodes
2024	Death and Other Details	Rufus Cotesworth	10 episodes
2025	Brilliant Minds	Noah Wolf	2 episodes
2025	The Artist	Norman Henry	6 episodes
2025	The American Revolution	Benjamin Franklin	Voice; 6 episodes
TBA	God of War †	Odin	Supporting role

== Theatre credits ==
Year	Title	Role	Venue	Notes
1975	Trelawny of the 'Wells'	Mr. Arthur Gower	Vivian Beaumont Theatre, Broadway	
1975–76	Hamlet	Fortinbras, Player King	Vivian Beaumont Theatre, Broadway	
1976	Rebel Woman	Major Robert Steele Strong	The Public Theater, Off-Broadway	
1977	Savages	Carlos Esquerdo	Hudson Guild Theater, Off-Broadway	
1977	The Shadow Box	Mark	Morosco Theatre, Broadway	
1978	Split	Paul	Ensemble Studio Theatre, New York	
1979	Leave It to Beaver is Dead	Saverin	The Public Theater, Off-Broadway	
1979–80	Evita	Che	Orpheum Theatre, San Francisco	
1979–80	Evita	Che	Broadway Theatre, Broadway	
1981	Henry IV, Part 1	Hotspur	The Public Theater, Off-Broadway	
1983	Sunday in the Park with George	Georges Seurat / George	Playwrights Horizons, Off-Broadway	
1984–85	Sunday in the Park with George	Georges Seurat / George	Booth Theatre, Broadway	
1985	Follies	Buddy Plummer	Lincoln Center, Broadway	
1987	The Knife	Peter	The Public Theater, Off-Broadway	
1989	The Winter's Tale	Leontes	The Public Theater, Off-Broadway	
1989	Mandy Patinkin in Concert: Dress Casual	Performer	Helen Hayes Theatre, Broadway	
1991	The Secret Garden	Lord Archibald Craven	St. James Theatre, Broadway	
1993	Falsettos	Marvin	John Golden Theatre, Broadway	Replacement
1994	Sunday in the Park with George	Georges Seurat / George	St. James Theatre, Broadway	Concert
1994	Guys and Dolls	Sky Masterson	BBC Radio Theatre	Concert
1995	Carousel	Billy Bigelow	BBC Radio Theatre	Concert
1997	Mandy Patinkin in Concert	Performer	Lyceum Theatre, Broadway	
1998	Mandy Patinkin in Concert: Mamaloshen	Performer	Belasco Theatre, Broadway	
2000	The Wild Party	Burrs	August Wilson Theatre, Broadway	
2001	Mandy Patinkin in Concert	Performer	Neil Simon Theatre, Broadway	
2002	Celebrating Sondheim	Performer	Henry Miller's Theatre, Broadway	
2003	An Enemy of the People	Dr. Stockmann	Williamstown Theater Festival, Massachusetts	
2004	Mandy Patinkin in Concert	Performer	New World Stages, Off-Broadway	
2008	Mandy Patinkin on Broadway	Performer	Gerald Schoenfeld Theatre, Broadway	
2008	The Tempest	Prospero	Classic Stage Company, Off-Broadway	
2010	Paradise Found	Eunuch	Menier Chocolate Factory, Off-West End, London	
2011	Compulsion	Sid Silver	Yale Repertory Theatre; Berkeley Repertory Theatre; The Public Theater	
2011	An Evening with Patti LuPone and Mandy Patinkin	Performer	Ethel Barrymore Theatre, Broadway	
2015	The Last Two People on Earth: An Apocalyptic Vaudeville	Performer	American Repertory Theater	

=== Cast recordings ===
Year	Title	Role	Notes
1979	Evita	Che	Broadway cast recording
1984	Sunday in the Park with George	Georges Seurat / George	Broadway cast recording
1985	Follies	Buddy Plummer	Broadway cast recording
1986	South Pacific	Lieutenant Joseph Cable, USMC	Studio cast recording
1991	The Secret Garden	Lord Archibald Craven	Broadway cast recording
1996	Man of La Mancha	Sancho Panza	Studio cast recording
2000	The Wild Party	Burrs	Broadway cast recording

== Discography ==
- Mandy Patinkin (1989)
- Dress Casual (1990)
- I'm Breathless (1990)
- Experiment (1994)
- Oscar & Steve (1995)
- Mamaloshen (1998)
- Myths and Hymns (cast album, 1999)
- Kidults (2001)
- Mandy Patinkin Sings Sondheim (2002)
- Diary: January 27, 2018 (2018)
- Diary: April/May 2018 (2018)
- Diary: December 2018 (2019)
- Children and Art (2019)

== Awards and nominations ==
Theatre awards

Year	Award	Category	Title	Result	Ref.
1980	Tony Award	Best Featured Actor in a Musical	Evita	Won	
1980	Drama Desk Award	Outstanding Actor in a Musical	Evita	Nominated	
1982	Drama Desk Award	Outstanding Featured Actor in a Play	Henry IV	Nominated	
1984	Tony Award	Best Actor in a Musical	Sunday in the Park with George	Nominated	
1984	Drama Desk Award	Outstanding Actor in a Musical	Sunday in the Park with George	Nominated	
1987	Drama Desk Award	Outstanding Actor in a Musical	The Knife	Nominated	
1990	Drama Desk Award	Outstanding Solo Performance	Mandy Patinkin in Concert: Dress Casual	Nominated	
1990	Outer Critics Circle	Special Award	—N/a	Won	
1991	Outer Critics Circle	Outstanding Actor in a Musical	The Secret Garden	Nominated	
1991	Drama Desk Award	Outstanding Actor in a Musical	The Secret Garden	Nominated	
2000	Drama Desk Award	Outstanding Actor in a Musical	The Wild Party	Nominated	
2000	Tony Award	Best Actor in a Musical	The Wild Party	Nominated	

Film and television awards

Year	Award	Category	Title	Result	Ref.
1995	Primetime Emmy Award	Outstanding Actor in a Drama Series	Chicago Hope	Won	
1996	Primetime Emmy Award	Outstanding Guest Actor in a Comedy Series	The Larry Sanders Show	Nominated	
1999	Primetime Emmy Award	Outstanding Guest Actor in a Drama Series	Chicago Hope	Nominated	
2013	Primetime Emmy Award	Outstanding Supporting Actor in a Drama Series	Homeland	Nominated	
2014	Primetime Emmy Award	Outstanding Supporting Actor in a Drama Series	Homeland	Nominated	
2017	Primetime Emmy Award	Outstanding Supporting Actor in a Drama Series	Homeland	Nominated	
2018	Primetime Emmy Award	Outstanding Supporting Actor in a Drama Series	Homeland	Nominated	
1983	Golden Globe Award	Best Actor - Motion Picture Musical or Comedy	Yentl	Nominated	
1994	Golden Globe Award	Best Actor - Television Drama Series	Chicago Hope	Nominated	
2012	Golden Globe Award	Best Supporting Actor - Television	Homeland	Nominated	
1995	Screen Actors Guild Award	Outstanding Actor in a Drama Series	Chicago Hope	Nominated	
1990	Saturn Award	Best Supporting Actor	Alien Nation	Nominated	

- On February 12, 2018, Patinkin received a Star on the Hollywood Walk of Fame at 6243 Hollywood Blvd for his work on television.

Preceded by Jonathan Winters	Voice of Papa Smurf; 2017 film Smurfs: The Lost Village	Succeeded by Scott Innes
