= List of Billboard Easy Listening number ones of 1969 =

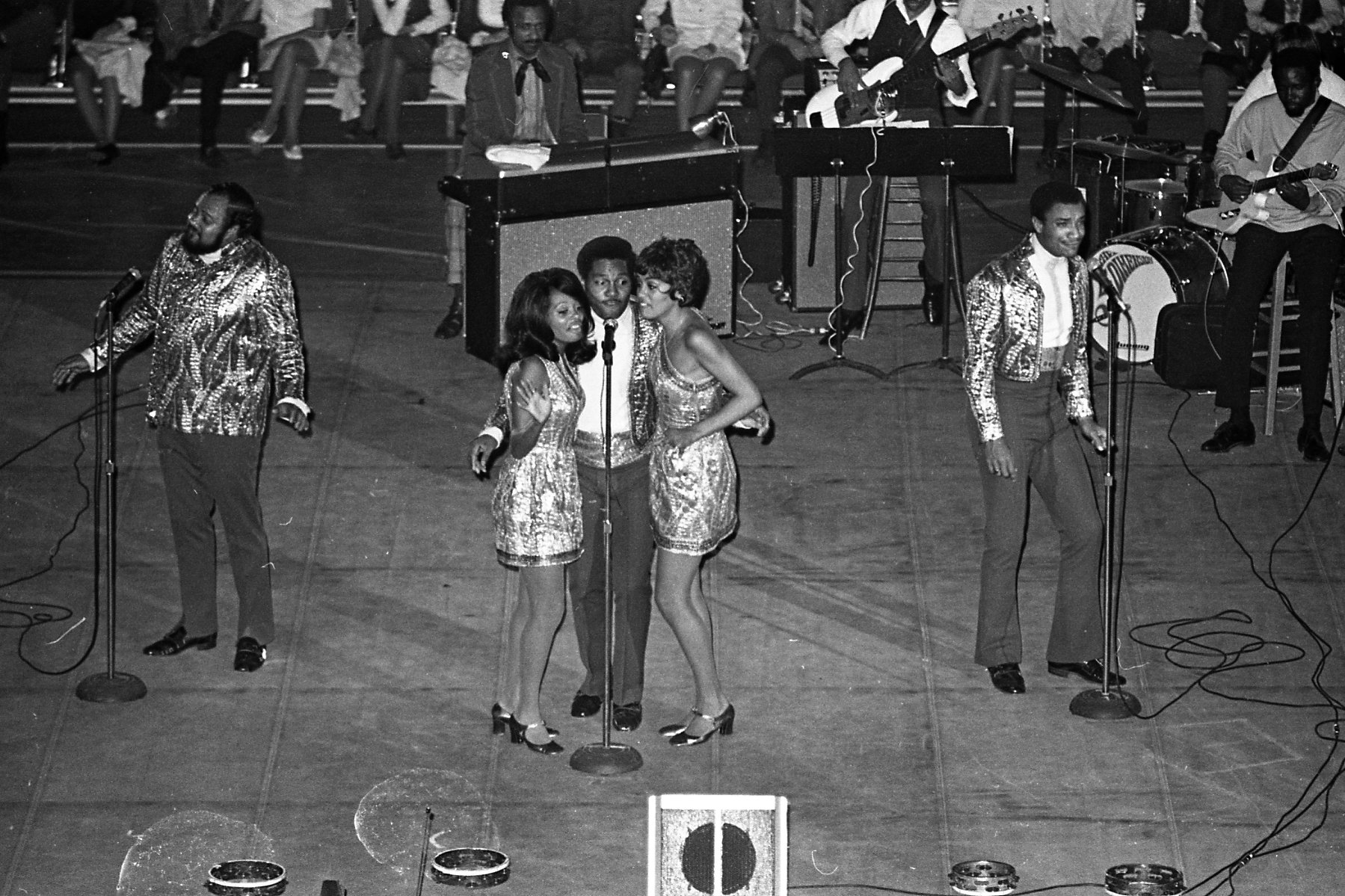
The 5th Dimension had two chart-toppers in 1969.

In 1969, Billboard magazine published a chart ranking the top-performing songs in the United States in the easy listening market. The chart, which in 1969 was entitled Easy Listening, has undergone various name changes and has been published since 1996 under the title Adult Contemporary. In 1969, 17 songs topped the chart based on playlists submitted by easy listening radio stations and sales reports submitted by stores.

On the first chart of 1969, Glen Campbell held the top spot with "Wichita Lineman", which was in its fourth week at number one, and remained atop the chart for a further two weeks. Campbell would go on to top the chart with "Galveston" and "Try a Little Kindness", making him the only act to achieve three Easy Listening number ones in 1969. His total of ten weeks in the top spot was also the highest achieved by any act during the year. The only other act with multiple chart-toppers during the year was the 5th Dimension, who reached the top spot with "Medley: Aquarius/Let the Sunshine In (The Flesh Failures)" and "Wedding Bell Blues". The longest unbroken run at number one by a song was eight weeks, achieved by the conductor Henry Mancini's "Love Theme from Romeo and Juliet". Unusually, the number-one song on Billboard's year-end easy listening chart for the year was a track which did not reach number one in the weekly charts: "Hurt So Bad" by the Lettermen.

Several of 1969's chart-toppers came from films and stage musicals. These included Mancini's theme from the film Romeo and Juliet, Oliver's song "Jean" from the film The Prime of Miss Jean Brodie, "Raindrops Keep Fallin' on My Head" by B. J. Thomas from the film Butch Cassidy and the Sundance Kid, the 5th Dimension's medley of two songs from the musical Hair, and Sammy Davis Jr.'s version of "I've Gotta Be Me", which placed highly on both the easy listening and pop charts even though the musical in which it originated, Golden Rainbow, was unsuccessful. There was considerable crossover in 1969 between the Easy Listening chart and Billboard's pop chart, the Hot 100. Five songs topped both listings during the year: Mancini's "Love Theme from Romeo and Juliet", both of the 5th Dimension's chart-toppers, "In the Year 2525 (Exordium and Terminus)" by Zager and Evans, and "Leaving on a Jet Plane" by Peter, Paul and Mary. Additionally, the final Easy Listening number one of the year, "Raindrops Keep Fallin' on My Head", went on to top the Hot 100 early in 1970. Although Zager and Evans achieved the feat of topping both listings, the duo proved to be a one-hit wonder and never placed another song on either the pop or easy listening chart.

== Chart history ==
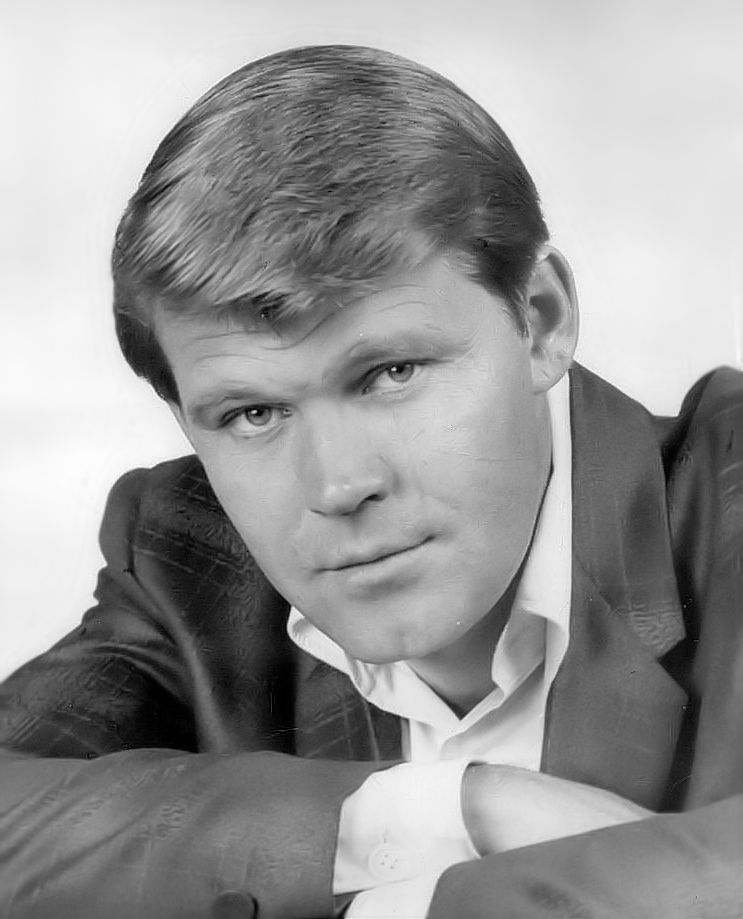
Glen Campbell had three number ones in 1969.

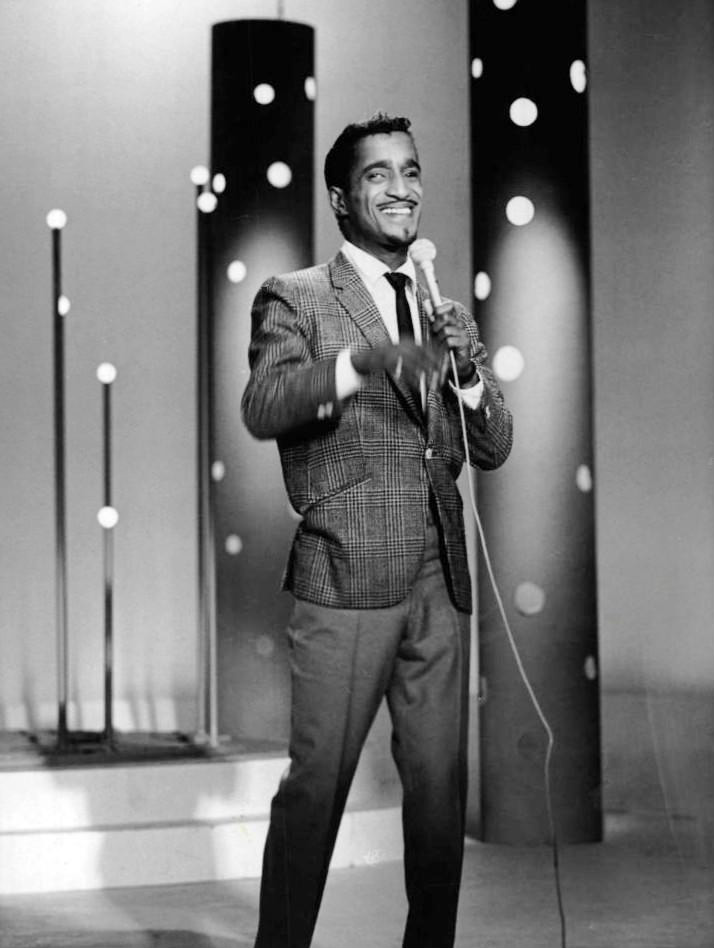
Sammy Davis Jr. spent seven weeks at number one with "I've Gotta Be Me", a song from the short-lived stage musical Golden Rainbow.

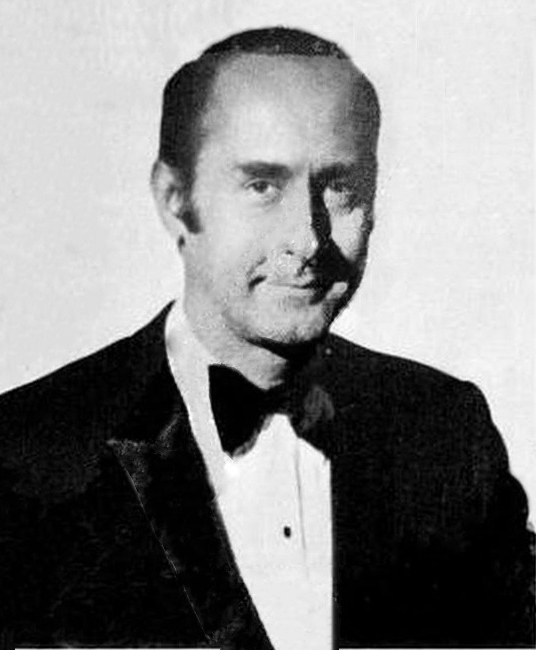
Henry Mancini's "Love Theme from Romeo and Juliet" was the year's longest-running number one.

Chart history
Issue date	Title	Artist(s)	Ref.
January 4	"Wichita Lineman"	Glen Campbell	
January 11	"Wichita Lineman"	Glen Campbell	
January 18	"Wichita Lineman"	Glen Campbell	
January 25	"I've Gotta Be Me"	Sammy Davis Jr.	
February 1	"I've Gotta Be Me"	Sammy Davis Jr.	
February 8	"I've Gotta Be Me"	Sammy Davis Jr.	
February 15	"I've Gotta Be Me"	Sammy Davis Jr.	
February 22	"I've Gotta Be Me"	Sammy Davis Jr.	
March 1	"I've Gotta Be Me"	Sammy Davis Jr.	
March 8	"I've Gotta Be Me"	Sammy Davis Jr.	
March 15	"You Gave Me a Mountain"	Frankie Laine	
March 22	"You Gave Me a Mountain"	Frankie Laine	
March 29	"Galveston"	Glen Campbell	
April 5	"Galveston"	Glen Campbell	
April 12	"Galveston"	Glen Campbell	
April 19	"Galveston"	Glen Campbell	
April 26	"Galveston"	Glen Campbell	
May 3	"Galveston"	Glen Campbell	
May 10	"Medley: Aquarius/Let the Sunshine In (The Flesh Failures)"	The 5th Dimension	
May 17	"Medley: Aquarius/Let the Sunshine In (The Flesh Failures)"	The 5th Dimension	
May 24	"Happy Heart"	Andy Williams	
May 31	"Happy Heart"	Andy Williams	
June 7	"Love Theme from Romeo and Juliet"	Henry Mancini	
June 14	"Love Theme from Romeo and Juliet"	Henry Mancini	
June 21	"Love Theme from Romeo and Juliet"	Henry Mancini	
June 28	"Love Theme from Romeo and Juliet"	Henry Mancini	
July 5	"Love Theme from Romeo and Juliet"	Henry Mancini	
July 12	"Love Theme from Romeo and Juliet"	Henry Mancini	
July 19	"Love Theme from Romeo and Juliet"	Henry Mancini	
July 26	"Love Theme from Romeo and Juliet"	Henry Mancini	
August 2	"Spinning Wheel"	Blood, Sweat & Tears	
August 9	"Spinning Wheel"	Blood, Sweat & Tears	
August 16	"In the Year 2525 (Exordium and Terminus)"	Zager and Evans	
August 23	"In the Year 2525 (Exordium and Terminus)"	Zager and Evans	
August 30	"A Boy Named Sue"	Johnny Cash	
September 6	"A Boy Named Sue"	Johnny Cash	
September 13	"I'll Never Fall in Love Again"	Tom Jones	
September 20	"Jean"	Oliver	
September 27	"Jean"	Oliver	
October 4	"Jean"	Oliver	
October 11	"Jean"	Oliver	
October 18	"Is That All There Is?"	Peggy Lee	
October 25	"Is That All There Is?"	Peggy Lee	
November 1	"Wedding Bell Blues"	The 5th Dimension	
November 8	"Wedding Bell Blues"	The 5th Dimension	
November 15	"Try a Little Kindness"	Glen Campbell	
November 22	"Leaving on a Jet Plane"	Peter, Paul and Mary	
November 29	"Leaving on a Jet Plane"	Peter, Paul and Mary	
December 6	"Leaving on a Jet Plane"	Peter, Paul and Mary	
December 13	"Raindrops Keep Fallin' on My Head"	B. J. Thomas	
December 20	"Raindrops Keep Fallin' on My Head"	B. J. Thomas	
December 27	"Raindrops Keep Fallin' on My Head"	B. J. Thomas	
