= Paul Ford (disambiguation) =

Paul Ford (1901–1976) was an American actor.

Paul Ford may also refer to:

- Paul Leicester Ford (1865–1902), American novelist and biographer
- Paul Ford (technologist) (born 1974), American programmer, writer, and entrepreneur
- Paul Ford, co-founder of MyToons
- Paul Ford (pianist), accompanist for Mandy Patinkin Sings Sondheim

== See also ==
- Christopher Paul Ford, American actor and martial arts black belt master
