= Erik Kriek =

Dutch cartoonist (born 1966)

Erik Kriek (born 18 November 1966, Amsterdam) is a Dutch artist and the winner of the 2008 Stripschapprijs. He writes and draws the comic book, Gutsman. In addition to his work he collects banjos and plays in a bluegrass band.

Some of the most notable books he has illustrated are: The Set-up: The lost classic by the author of The Wild Party by Joseph Moncure March (Korero Press 2021), Welcome to Creek Country: (Concerto 2020) and In the Pines: Murder Ballads (Fantagraphics 2017).
