= The Set-Up (poem) =

1928 book-length poem by Joseph Moncure March

The Set-Up is a book-length narrative poem, written by Joseph Moncure March. It was first published in the winter of 1928 by Pascal Covici, Inc., after the success of March's first poem, The Wild Party (1926), which became a succès de scandale after it was banned in Boston for lewdness. In 1949, it was adapted into a film of the same name, directed by Robert Wise.

The Set-Up was inspired by a painting of James Chapin's, which March first saw in 1928. "Chapin's portrait shows a stolid black figure sitting in his corner between rounds and staring meaninglessly into the ring, eyebrows drawn down low on a much-pummelled face, boxing gloves reposing gently on his knees. Meanwhile, his middle-aged white handler leans back on the ropes in a carefree, hard-to-read posture—is he gesturing to some pal in the crowd? Smiling at the mockery of the fight racket? Just enjoying the moment and the way the light gleams on his pomaded hair? Whatever Chapin's intended meaning, March seems to have taken from the painting, so that later he could put it into his poem, a sharp awareness of the distance between those who fight and those who watch the fighting; those nakedly exposed and those covering something up."

== Plot ==
The narrative tells the story of an ageing African-American boxer used as a "set-up" against a younger boxer, Sailor Gray. The story focuses on the link between crime and professional boxing as it was in the first half of the 20th century. March is interested in the role race plays in the sport, and how racial politics appear when they are transmuted into the boxing ring. "Pansy had the stuff, but his skin was brown; And he never got a chance at the middleweight crown." The world that March depicts is brutal, the people are vicious to each other. We first encounter fighter-managers Cohn and Ed MacPhail in Herman Brecht's bar, where they are due to meet Tony Morelli. Morelli, a fight boss, is in need of a fighter to set against his up-and-coming young fighter Sailor Gray. Cohn and MacPhail suggest Pansy Jones as a candidate, and the fight is fixed. Money is exchanged, Morelli tells Cohn and Ed MacPhail to give a portion to Jones to ensure he "goes down to Gray" but after leaving the bar Cohn and Ed MacPhail decide not to give Jones any of the fixing money. When the fight takes place Pansy Jones discovers the truth and, pride bruised, angrily wins the fight against Gray. Much to the resentment of the fight-managers who, accompanied by Gray, subsequently, chase Pansy Jones down. They run him into the subway, and Pansy Jones falls onto the tracks of an oncoming train. The ending is ambiguous, but it is assumed he dies.

== History ==
A new hardcover edition of The Set-Up was released in 1968, called A Certain Wildness, which contained both The Set-Up and The Wild Party coupled with an introductory piece by March himself, which functioned as a short memoir. This edition also featured an introduction by the American poet and critic Louis Untermeyer and black-and-white illustrations by the artist Paul Busch. This edition was different from the original text for the characters were de-ethnicized. Herman was no longer German, Morelli was no longer Italian and Cohn was no longer Jewish. This is because The Set-Up was met with criticism after the Second World War because of its stereotypical depictions of race, which were seen as derogatory and insensitive. March wrote that he "was trying to reflect the melting-pot character of New York as it was in those days". Yet he nevertheless concedes the critics' point and writes in the introduction to the volume:

"There was an ugly aftermath to The Set-Up. When I came back to New York, I found that the narrative was considered by some to be "anti-Semitic". This was because I had made one of the Negro boxer's managers a Jew, and had drawn him as a thoroughly obnoxious and unscrupulous character. I was appalled by this accusation, and it rankled – the more so since I had always regarded anti-Semitism as a prejudice espoused by morons and illiterates; a viewpoint so unreasonable that no educated or right-thinking person could entertain it. [...] But, the era in which no one considered The Set-Up anti-Semitic has long since vanished. The prevailing mood of today would have no patience with my obnoxious Jewish fight-manager. The truth is, my own attitudes have changed with the times, just as everyone else's have, and today I find the Jewish character I created forty years ago distasteful too. So when a new edition of The Set-Up seemed probable, I decided to re-write portions of the narrative and eliminate this undesirable character [...] and while I as at it, I went through the book and carefully denationalised all the characters. By today's ethnic standards, the narrative is now clean."

The Set-Up was adapted into a film by RKO in 1949, directed by Robert Wise and adapted for screen by Art Cohn. The Set-Up gained critical approval (it won two awards at Cannes Film Festival). But March was not involved, despite offering his help to production. He did not gain anything from Robert Wise's success with The Set-Up (1949), "not least because it didn't bear any resemblance to March's original text." Wise decided to change Pansy to a white man, much to March's dismay. He had "scrapped enough money together for balcony seats" and saw the film with his wife Peggy in Times Square. In his memoir he recalls: "I was really disgusted to find that the hero of the picture was no longer a Negro fighter: they had turned him into a white man! The whole point of the narrative had been tossed out the window. Ah, Hollywood… !"

A new edition of The Set-Up was published by Korero Press in 2022, with an introduction by Masha Thorpe and illustrations by Erik Kriek.
