= The Wild Party (Lippa musical) =

Musical by Andrew Lippa

- Original cast album
- Music: Andrew Lippa
- Lyrics: Andrew Lippa
- Book: Andrew Lippa
- Basis: The Wild Party by Joseph Moncure March
- Productions: 1997 Eugene O'Neill Theatre Center; 2000 Off-Broadway; 2004 Edinburgh Festival Fringe; 2008 Brooklyn; 2010 St. Louis; 2015 Encores!

The Wild Party is a musical with book, lyrics, and music by Andrew Lippa.

Based on Joseph Moncure March's 1928 narrative poem of the same name, it coincidentally made its debut off-Broadway during the same theatre season (1999–2000) as a Broadway production with the same name and source material.

== Synopsis ==
=== Act I ===
It's the roaring 1920s and the beautiful, young Queenie, although she tries, cannot find a lover able to satisfy her desires – until she meets Burrs, a vaudevillian clown with a voracious appetite for women. Both Queenie and Burrs have now met their emotional and sexual match ("Queenie Was a Blonde").

For a while, they live together happily sated. However, the relationship eventually sours. Burrs' violent nature, which once thrilled Queenie, now scares her ("The Apartment"). Still, she longs to generate the same excitement that brought them together. She suggests a party, and Burrs agrees ("Out of the Blue").

The party begins with a parade of guests: Madelaine the lesbian, Eddie the thug, Mae the dimwit, Jackie the dancer, lover-brothers d'Armano, Dolores the hooker, and Nadine the minor ("What a Party"). Although Queenie radiates beauty and confidence, Burrs preys on other women. He makes his move on their youngest guest, Nadine. Despite her casual reprimand of his behavior, Queenie wants to hurt Burrs in return ("Raise the Roof").

The vivacious Kate arrives with her new friend, Mr. Black ("Look at Me Now"). Queenie, quite taken by Black, plans to make her move on him. Kate drags him away to meet the other guests. Queenie's plans are momentarily undermined ("He Was Calm"). The party's revelry continues: Burrs hits on Kate; Madelaine hits on Nadine, Eddie chugs beer and almost fights with Burrs. During the chaos, Black finds himself equally as taken by Queenie as she with him - much to the chagrin of Kate ("Poor Child"). As revenge, Kate plans on seducing Burrs. Meanwhile, in a corner of the room, Madelaine is in a drunken stupor and on the prowl for a woman with very little success ("An Old-Fashioned Love Story").

Meanwhile, the rest of the party guests begin to get comfortable, indulging in alcohol and cocaine and growing increasingly intoxicated ("By Now the Room Was Moving"). Though Queenie is fully aware that Burrs will threaten her physically, she makes her move on Mr. Black, easily getting him to dance with her. Burrs watches them, his ire rising. Unsuccessfully, Kate tries to get Burrs to dance – then to defuse the situation, Kate takes Queenie out of Mr. Black's arms and dances with her instead.

Burrs' violent reaction against Mr. Black and Queenie is prohibited by the whole company dancing the Juggernaut ("The Juggernaut"). At its end, Mr. Black and Queenie are together again. To get the reaction he wants from Queenie, Burrs grabs Nadine, the minor, and makes out with her. This enrages Kate who throws Nadine to the ground by her hair. Madelaine rushes to aid Nadine. Burrs cuts into Mr. Black and Queenie's dancing.

Managing to have her to himself, Burrs tells Queenie to stay away from Mr. Black. Laughing at him, Queenie says she will do whatever she chooses. He twists her arm. They are interrupted by Oscar and Phil at the piano ("Intro to 'Wild, Wild Party'"). Burrs releases Queenie, seeing that too many people are watching.

Burrs and Queenie join Oscar and Phil's epic musical number based on the story of Adam and Eve – Burrs plays Adam and Queenie, Eve ("A Wild, Wild Party"). Their number is interrupted by a discontented neighbor. Eddie and Mae yell insults to the man and the crowd goes wild. The two celebrate their togetherness ("Two of a Kind").

Suddenly, Mr. Black approaches Queenie and pointedly asks why she stays with an abusive brute ("Of All the Luck"). She reflects on her situation and comes to the conclusion that, perhaps, she has just learned to like the aggressive treatment ("Maybe I Like It This Way").

Elsewhere, Kate is attempting to seduce Burrs. He refuses her advances and expresses his deepest, darkest feelings for Queenie - she is driving him crazy ("What Is It About Her?"). Kate tries to kiss Burrs, but he pushes away. Black kisses Queenie. She embraces him.

=== Act II ===
The party rages on. Kate is alone and reflecting on her youthful indulgence ("The Life of the Party").

Alone in the bathroom, Queenie is taking stock of her predicament. Although she's angry that she has confided in Black, a virtual stranger, she recognizes his goodness ("Who Is This Man?"). This both stirs and confuses her feelings. Black enters the bathroom with a drink. The two share a moment as Black conveys his admiration for Queenie ("I'll Be Here"). Suddenly, Burrs comes in seeking Queenie's attention. He apologizes for his behavior and asks her forgiveness. Before she can respond, Kate arrives. She unsuccessfully tries to draw Burrs back onto the dance floor. Both men pull for her affections and devotion—Mr. Black asks Queenie to leave the apartment with him. Burrs ask her to stop the party and let them return to their isolation. Queenie is unable to respond to either man ("Listen to Me").

Frustrated and hurt, Burrs lashes out by physically threatening her. His outburst causes Queenie to leave the bathroom and Black quickly follows. It is clear that Burrs is quickly becoming desperate and depressed ("Let Me Drown"). Soon after, he hallucinates and hears Queenie's voice in his head. Thinking Mae is Queenie, he mistakenly attacks her and angers Eddie. A fight ensues ("The Fight").

Mr. Black and Queenie return to find Eddie viciously beating Burrs. Queenie is afraid that Burrs will be killed if it is not stopped. Black rushes in and knocks Eddie unconscious with a chair out of concern. Mae tends to Eddie and Kate comes to the aid of a passed-out Burrs (“Take A Hit”). Realizing all of the trouble he is causing, Mr. Black tells Queenie that he will leave. Queenie, however, cannot let him go and leads him into the bedroom ("Tell Me Something"). In a moment of passion, the two begin making love. The party guests follow suit in the living room ("Come With Me").

Early the next morning, the revelers lie asleep in the living room, and Jackie dances for the last time before he departs ("Jackie's Last Dance"). Kate wakes Burrs who is beside her. Queenie is strikingly absent. Burrs, fearing the worst, staggers to the bedroom to find her in the bed with Black. When the two lovers wake, Queenie recoils in shock; Black jumps up and attempts to tackle Burrs but fails. Burrs moves to the dresser and locates a gun. Full of rage, he vacillates between trying to force Queenie to choose between the two men and threatening to kill Black, Queenie, or himself, claiming that when one of them dies, whoever it is, it will satisfy him ("Make Me Happy").

Black, who realizes that Burrs is about to make a decision, takes the chance and lunges at Burrs. The gun goes off. Burrs is dead. Fearing that Mr. Black will now be executed for the death, Queenie urges him to flee. Before leaving, Black professes his love for her ("Poor Child [Reprise]"). Queenie, now having lost both men, questions how things managed to reach that point of loss. She exits the apartment - with her coat - all eyes upon her sad, beautiful grace ("How Did We Come to This?/Queenie Was a Blonde [Reprise]").

== Productions ==
The musical was performed at the Eugene O'Neill Theatre Center in 1997 as a workshop; Kristin Chenoweth was Mae.

The musical opened Off-Broadway on February 24, 2000, at the Manhattan Theatre Club and ran for 54 performances. Directed by Gabriel Barre, choreographed by Mark Dendy, and with musical direction by Stephen Oremus, it starred Julia Murney as Queenie, Brian d'Arcy James as Burrs, Taye Diggs as Mr. Black, Idina Menzel as Kate and Alix Korey as Madelaine True.

A cast album was released in 2000 by RCA Records.

In 2004, The Wild Party was produced as part of the Edinburgh Festival Fringe. The musical has been staged in cities throughout the United States including Brooklyn, St. Louis, Chicago, Baltimore in 2011, Cincinnati in 2013, Memphis in 2007, Valparaiso, Indiana, and Reno.

New York City Center's Encores! Off-Center series presented a staged concert version of The Wild Party as the final production of its 2015 season, running July 15–18. With direction by Leigh Silverman and choreography by Sonya Tayeh, it featured Sutton Foster as Queenie, Steven Pasquale (who was a member of the original off-Broadway company) as Burrs, Brandon Victor Dixon as Mr. Black, Joaquina Kalukango as Kate, Miriam Shor as Madelaine True, and Ryan Andes as Eddie.

== Casts ==
| Character | Original Off-Broadway Cast 2000 | Encores! Off-Center 2015 |
|---|---|---|
| Queenie | Julia Murney | Sutton Foster |
| Burrs | Brian d'Arcy James | Steven Pasquale |
| Mr. Black | Taye Diggs | Brandon Victor Dixon |
| Kate | Idina Menzel | Joaquina Kalukango |
| Madelaine True | Alix Korey | Miriam Shor |
| Eddie | Raymond Jaramillo McLeod | Ryan Andes |
| Mae | Jennifer Cody | Talene Monahon |
| Phil D’Armano | Kevin Cahoon | Britton Smith |
| Oscar D’Armano | Charles Dillon | Clifton Oliver |
| Jackie | Lawrence Keigwin | Ryan Steele |
| Sam Himmelstein | Peter Kapetan | Charlie Pollock |
| Max | James Delisco Beeks | Raymond J. Lee |
| Dolores | Kena Tangi Dorsey | Rachel DeBenedet |
| Nadine | Kristin McDonald | Renée Albulario |

== Song list ==
Act I

- "Queenie was a Blonde" – Queenie, Burrs and Company
- "The Apartment" – Queenie, Burrs and Company
- "Out of the Blue" – Queenie and Burrs
- "What a Party" – Company
- "Raise the Roof" – Queenie and Company
- "Look at Me Now" – Kate, Max and Black
- "He Was Calm" – Company
- "Poor Child" – Black, Burrs, Kate and Queenie
- "An Old-Fashioned Love Story" – Madelaine
- "By Now the Room Was Moving" – Company
- "The Juggernaut" – Queenie, Black, Kate, Burrs and Company
- "A Wild, Wild Party" – D'Armano Brothers, Queenie, Max, Eddie, Burrs and Company
- "Two of a Kind" – Eddie and Mae
- "Of All the Luck" – Black and Queenie
- "Maybe I Like it This Way" – Queenie
- "What Is It About Her?" – Burrs and Queenie

Act II

- "The Life of the Party" – Kate
- "Who Is This Man?" – Queenie
- "The Gal for Me" — Queenie and Black
- "I'll Be Here" – Black
- "Listen to Me" – Queenie, Burrs, Black and Kate
- "Let Me Drown" – Burrs, Kate and Company
- "The Fight" – Company
- “Take a Hit” — Kate and Burrs
- "Tell Me Something" – Queenie and Black
- "Come With Me" – Black, Queenie and Company
- "Jackie's Last Dance" – Instrumental
- "Make Me Happy" – Burrs, Black and Queenie
- "Poor Child [Reprise]" – Queenie and Black
- "How Did We Come to This?" / "Queenie was a Blonde" (Reprise) – Queenie and Company

== Critical reception ==
Ben Brantley of the New York Times said Lippa's score "has a jittery, wandering quality, conscientiously shifting styles and tempos as if in search of a lost chord. ... The ballads... are of the high-decibel, swooning pop variety made popular by Frank Wildhorn. ... Mr. Lippa fares better with pastiches of jazz, vaudeville and gospel vintage, although these, too, suffer by comparison to the Kander-Ebb songs for Chicago." The CurtainUp reviewer wrote: "The Wild Party may not be the perfect musical we've all been looking for but it's great fun to watch and puts enough talent on display to have warranted a longer run than it will have."

== Awards and honors ==
The Wild Party won the 2000 Drama Desk Award for Outstanding Music, the Outer Critics Circle Award for Outstanding Off-Broadway Musical, Lucille Lortel Awards for Scenic, Costume, and Lighting Design, and the 1999-2000 Obie Award for Best Choreography. It was nominated for four additional 2000 Outer Critics Circle Awards: Outstanding Actor in a Musical (Taye Diggs), Outstanding Director of a Musical (Gabriel Barre), Outstanding Choreography (Mark Dendy), and Outstanding Lighting Design (Kenneth Posner). The musical received a total of thirteen Drama Desk Award nominations, including Best Actor in a Musical (Brian D'Arcy James), Best Actress in a Musical (Julia Murney), and Featured Actress in a Musical (Alix Korey and Idina Menzel).

== Comparison with LaChiusa's Wild Party ==
The Andrew Lippa and Michael John LaChiusa versions of The Wild Party are markedly different in their storylines. In Lippa's version, the plot is centered on the central love triangle of Joseph Moncure March's original poem, and the cast is much smaller. Many of the characters in LaChiusa's version do not appear in Lippa's version at all, or have much smaller roles (notably Dolores, who in LaChiusa's version was a major supporting role originated by Eartha Kitt).

There are major differences in the music and tone of the two shows as well. Lippa's songs are less tied to the plot of the show and can be understood out of context. Comparatively, the LaChiusa score is tightly interwoven with the plot of the show. Stylistically, LaChiusa mimics the jazz of the era while Lippa uses a deliberately anachronistic pop-rock sound, complete with electric guitars.
