= I've Gotta Be Me =

- 2017 re-release

Single by Sammy Davis Jr.

from the album I've Gotta Be Me
- B-side: "Bein' Natural Bein' Me"
- Released: 1968
- Recorded: 1968
- Genre: Traditional Pop
- Length: 2:53
- Label: Reprise
- Songwriter: Walter Marks
- Producer: Jimmy Bowen

Sammy Davis Jr. singles chronology
"Break My Mind" (1968)	"I've Gotta Be Me" (1968)	"Salt and Pepper" (1968)

"I've Gotta Be Me" is a popular song that appeared in the Broadway musical Golden Rainbow, which starred Steve Lawrence and Eydie Gormé. It opened in New York City at the Shubert Theatre on February 4, 1968, and closed just under a year later, on January 11, 1969. The music and lyrics for the musical were composed and written by Walter Marks in 1967; the production featured a book by Ernest Kinoy. This song was listed in the musical as "I've Got to Be Me" and, at the end of the first act, it was sung by Lawrence's character, Larry Davis. Lawrence released it as a single in 1967, and hit #6 on the Billboard Easy Listening chart the following year, with little or no support from traditional Top 40 radio.

Sammy Davis Jr. recorded the song in 1968 while the musical was still running on Broadway, altering the title slightly to "I've Gotta Be Me", and released it as a single late in the year. This version was a surprise hit for Davis, since "Golden Rainbow" was not among the more successful shows on Broadway that season. Produced by Jimmy Bowen, Davis's cover peaked at #11 on the Billboard Hot 100 chart in early 1969 and remained in the Top 40 for 11 weeks. "I've Gotta Be Me" spent seven weeks at #1 on the Easy Listening chart. The song lent its title to Davis's 1968 album I've Gotta Be Me.

The song has been featured in at least two soft drink advertising campaigns. Welsh pop singer Duffy performed it while riding a bicycle in European television advertisements for Diet Coke, beginning in February 2009. The 60 second commercial was first aired in the end break of the 2009 BRIT Awards on February 18. A version by Ryan Tedder was used by Dr Pepper in 2012. The song was used in the 2001 film Freddy Got Fingered, the 2020 film Timmy Failure: Mistakes Were Made and the 2021 film Nobody.

== See also ==
- List of number-one adult contemporary singles of 1969 (U.S.)
