= Sammy Davis Jr. Sings the Complete "Dr. Dolittle" =

Studio album by Sammy Davis Jr.
- Released: October 1967
- Recorded: June 28 and 29, 1967
- Genre: Vocal jazz
- Length: 42:42
- Label: Reprise
- Producer: Alan A. Freeman

Sammy Davis Jr. chronology
That's All! (1967)	Sammy Davis Jr. Sings the Complete "Dr. Dolittle" (1967)	Lonely Is the Name (1968)

Professional ratings
Review scores
Source	Rating
Allmusic	4.5/5 stars

Sammy Davis Jr. Sings the Complete "Dr. Dolittle" is a 1967 studio album by Sammy Davis Jr., of songs from the 1967 musical Doctor Dolittle.

== Track listing ==
1. "My Friend the Doctor" – 2:53
2. "Beautiful Things" – 4:46
3. "Fabulous Places" – 2:31
4. "I've Never Seen Anything Like It" – 2:04
5. "Where Are the Words" – 2:53
6. "At the Crossroads" – 2:18
7. "Doctor Dolittle" – 2:00
8. "Something in Your Smile" – 4:08
9. "I Think I Like You" – 2:57
10. "When I Look in Your Eyes" – 3:10
11. "After Today" – 2:23
12. "Talk to the Animals" – 2:55

All songs written by Leslie Bricusse.

== Personnel ==
Recorded June 28 and 29 1967, Olympic Studios Barnes, London:

- Sammy Davis Jr.: vocals
- Marty Paich: arranger, conductor
- Keith Grant: engineer
