= Peter Kapetan =

American actor (1956–2008)

- Born: October 21, 1956
- Died: June 4, 2008 (aged 51); New York City, US
- Education: Andover
- Alma mater: Northwestern
- Occupations: Actor; singer; dancer
- Years active: 1979–2008

Peter Murray Kapetan (October 21, 1956 – June 4, 2008) was an American Broadway actor, singer and dancer. He performed in the musical The Wedding Singer as a Ronald Reagan impersonator. He appeared in Titanic, Sunset Boulevard, Joseph and the Amazing Technicolor Dreamcoat, and Got Tu Go Disco. He appeared in many national tours and off–Broadway productions. He died of cancer on June 4, 2008.

== Early life ==
Kapetan was a graduate of Phillips Academy in Andover and was part of the school's first co–educational class. In 1974, he played the lead role of the French planter Emile in the school's production of the musical South Pacific, playing opposite classmate Dana Delany. He attended Northwestern University and graduated in 1978.

== Career ==
Kapetan played the role of Oliver Webb in the production of On the Twentieth Century. He played one of the brothers in the original cast of Joseph and the Amazing Technicolor Dreamcoat. He played a leading role in the off-Broadway production of Camelot with Richard Burton. He had leading roles in The Wedding Singer and Aida. He appeared in the movie Farm Girl in New York in 2008 and also in the Disney production of Confessions of a Shopaholic. He played the role of Sam Himmelsteen in The Wild Party. He was in the show The Scarlet Pimpernel.
