= I've Gotta Be Me (Sammy Davis Jr. album) =

Studio album by Sammy Davis Jr.
- Released: October 1968
- Genre: Traditional pop, vocal jazz
- Length: 42:42
- Label: Reprise
- Producer: Jimmy Bowen

Sammy Davis Jr. chronology
Lonely Is the Name (1968)	I've Gotta Be Me (1968)	Sammy Davis Jr's Greatest Hits – The Top Twelve (1968)

Singles from I've Gotta Be Me
- 1. "I've Gotta Be Me" Released: October 26, 1968

I've Gotta Be Me is a 1968 studio album by Sammy Davis Jr. The album includes covers of three songs from the musical Sweet Charity.

== Chart performance ==
The album debuted on Billboard magazine's Top LP's chart in the issue dated January 11, 1969, peaking at No. 24 during a twenty-five-week run on the chart.

== Track listing ==
1. "I've Gotta Be Me" (Walter Marks) – 2:58
2. "My Personal Property" (Cy Coleman and Dorothy Fields) – 2:26
3. "I'm Glad There Is You" (Jimmy Dorsey and Paul Mertz) – 2:30
4. "Here I'll Stay" (Alan Jay Lerner, Kurt Weill) – 3:10
5. "I'm a Brass Band" (Cy Coleman and Dorothy Fields) – 1:35
6. "If My Friends Could See Me Now" (Cy Coleman and Dorothy Fields) – 2:42
7. "I've Got You Under My Skin" (Cole Porter) – 2:26
8. "Somebody" (Sid Wayne, Ben Weisman) – 2:26
9. "She Believes in Me" (Baker Knight) – 2:55
10. "Sweet November" (Leslie Bricusse, Anthony Newley) – 2:39

== Personnel ==
- Sammy Davis Jr. – vocals
- Richard Wess – arranger
