= The Wild Party (LaChiusa musical) =

- Original Cast Album
- Music: Michael John LaChiusa
- Lyrics: Michael John LaChiusa
- Book: George C. Wolfe; Michael John LaChiusa
- Basis: The Wild Party by Joseph Moncure March
- Premiere: April 13, 2000: Virginia Theatre
- Productions: 2000 Broadway; 2017 Off-West End; 2026 Encores!

The Wild Party is a musical with a book by Michael John LaChiusa and George C. Wolfe and music and lyrics by LaChiusa. It is based on the 1928 Joseph Moncure March narrative poem of the same name. The Broadway production coincidentally opened during the same theatrical season (1999–2000) as an off-Broadway musical with the same title and source material.

The show is presented as a series of vaudeville sketches, complete with signs at the beginning and the end (but abandoned for most of the show) announcing the next scene propped on an easel at the side of the stage. Queenie and Burrs, whose relationship is disintegrating, host a party fueled by bathtub gin, cocaine, and uninhibited sexual behavior. It quickly devolves into an orgy that culminates in tragedy. The guests include fading star Dolores; Kate, Queenie's best friend and rival; Black, Kate's younger lover, who has his eye on Queenie; Jackie, a rich, "ambisextrous" kid who has his eye on everyone, regardless of gender or age; Oscar and Phil D'Armano, a gay couple/brother act; lesbian stripper Miss Madelaine True and her morphine-addicted girlfriend Sally; Black prizefighter Eddie, his white wife Mae and Mae's underaged Lolita-like sister, Nadine.

== Production ==
The Wild Party opened at the Virginia Theatre (now known as the August Wilson Theatre) on April 13, 2000, after 36 previews, and closed on June 11, 2000, after 68 performances. It was directed by Wolfe and choreographed by Joey McKneely. The cast included Toni Collette (making her Broadway debut) as Queenie, Mandy Patinkin as Burrs, and Yancey Arias as Black.

Although her role was reduced over the course of workshop productions, Eartha Kitt, returning to Broadway after an absence of more than twenty years, created the role of Dolores. The four were backed by a large ensemble cast, each of whom has a featured song or key moments to take center stage.

In 2001, LaChiusa said that the role of Queenie was written for African-American actress and singer Vanessa Williams, who was replaced with Collette when the former became pregnant.

LaChiusa said: "I don't think of it as something that was lost in the piece, but it would have been fascinating to see how an audience responded to a black Queenie. The show is all about the masks that we wear culturally and the removal of those masks over the course of the party. So it's all there...".

A cast album was released on the Decca Records label.

A revival was staged in London in 2017 at The Other Palace Theatre, directed by Drew McOnie. The production starred Frances Ruffelle and John Owen-Jones.

A revival opened in March 2026 at New York City Center, starring Jasmine Amy Rogers, Adrienne Warren, Jordan Donica, Claybourne Elder, Andrew Kober, Tonya Pinkins, Lesli Margherita, and Jelani Alladin.

== Synopsis ==
The Vaudeville The company recounts the story of Queenie, a blonde who works as a showgirl in the Vaudeville, who is attracted to "violent and vicious" men ("Queenie Was A Blonde"). She is currently living with a man named Burrs, who works in the same vaudeville, as the act after her. His act is a minstrel show, where he performs in black face ("Marie Is Tricky"). One Sunday, Queenie wakes up restless and she and Burrs soon come to blows. To try to put less strain on their relationship (and to convince her to put a knife down), Burrs suggest they throw a huge party and invite "all the old gang". Queenie is ecstatic and they get prepared for the evening ("Wild Party").

Promenade of Guests The guests soon arrive and exchange words with Burrs, and alcohol starts flowing ("Dry"). Queenie makes her appearance in a "new" dress ("My Beautiful Blonde"), and welcomes everyone, meeting Nadine, a minor who wants to be a blonde and drink bathtub gin ("Welcome To My Party"). Queenie takes her under her wing as she mingles with the other guests. Madelaine, an "almost famous" stripper, introduces Queenie to her new girlfriend, the catatonic morphine-addicted Sally, who she met crawling outside the theatre in a drugged stupor. Madelaine believes Sally is a "post-modernist", to which Burrs replies "in need of a post mortem".

Madelaine tells Queenie of their love and of Sally's genius ("Like Sally"). Next up is Jackie, an "ambisextrous" rich kid with his eye on anybody and everybody ("Breezin' Through Another Day"). The incestuously devoted D'Armono Brothers, Oscar and Phil sing a new ditty as Gold and Goldberg, two would-be producers, arrive. They are planning to move uptown, and Burrs is convinced that they want to take him. He joins in with the brothers to impress them ("Uptown").

Queenie wonders where her friend Kate is, and Burrs expresses his dislike for her. Eddie, a successful black boxer and his white wife Mae talk of their marriage ("Eddie and Mae"). Dolores, a faded star, hints to Burrs that she knows his secrets, and forces him to introduce her to Gold and Goldberg. The producers are fighting over their name (With Gold wanting to change Goldberg's name to "Golden" to hide their Jewish heritage) and how to become successful ("Gold and Goldberg"). Burrs introduces them to Dolores, who begins to seduce them with her feminine wiles ("Moving Uptown").

The Party Queenie starts a dance to raise the energy ("Black Bottom"), but Kate soon interrupts with her arrival. She has come with Mr. Black, an attractive gigolo. Queenie and Kate trade insults and love, telling Nadine of their double-edged friendship ("Best Friend").

Burrs and Kate do not get along, with Kate disapproving of Queenie's romantic entanglement with him, while Queenie and Black begin to feel an attraction to each other. Meanwhile, Jackie tries to separate the D'Armano brothers, flirting with Oscar ("A Little M-M-M"). Dolores hints to Queenie about troubles in Burrs' past ("Everybody Has Their Secrets") while Nadine sings a paean to Broadway, only to be cut off by Queenie ("The Lights Of Broadway").

Queenie and Black meet up and find their attraction growing stronger ("Tabu"). Queenie asks him to show her how he picks up ladies, and his hypothetical soon turns into a real proposition ("Takin' Care Of The Ladies") and he pulls her up to dance ("Tabu Dance"). Kate and Burrs notice how close Queenie and Black are becoming, and Burrs wonders about the demise of fidelity ("Wouldn't It Be Nice?"). Queenie tells Black of her troubled existence, wondering why she was born ("Lowdown-Down"), as Burrs hypes up the party with Gin ("Gin").

The party quickly escalates, with everybody drinking, dancing, and arguing. Dolores warns Queenie of Burrs' first wife, who he beat to death, and Queenie escapes to the bathroom. There, she is confronted by Burrs about her entanglement with Black, and he begins to assault her. Kate barges in and saves Queenie, and Burrs furiously rejoins the party with a coked-up Jackie. Kate and Queenie argue about her relationship with Burrs, as Jackie and Oscar are found having sex in the bathroom.

Oscar and Phil argue publicly, while Mae and Eddie exchange heated words. Kate warns Queenie that Burrs will kill her, and when Queenie refuses to listen, Kate jumps back into the party. Eddie and Mae soon come to blows - hitting each other, as Dolores seduces Gold and Goldberg, bringing them into the bedroom. Distraught with the state of the party, Queenie is dragged out by Black, as the party continues in full swing ("Wild"). Madelaine searches for Sally and asks her to say her name. The guests all gather and culminate in an orgy ("Need") as Burrs asks Kate about Black. Kate reveals that she knows Black is using her, but she is fine with it ("Black Is A Moocher").

Outside, Queenie and Black bond at the fact that they are different from the rest, wondering where they belong and what will become of them ("People Like Us").

After Midnight Dies Sally, naked, carrying her clothes, reveals she can see clearly now what she and everyone else is ("After Midnight Dies"). She finds Eddie recounting how it feels to beat someone acclaimed, but still be detested ("Golden Boy").

She notices Oscar and Phil making up, and turns to find Gold and Goldberg, pants nowhere to be found, wondering what has happened to them. Dolores appears and warns them that their promise must be kept, or terrible things will occur ("The Movin' Uptown Blues"). She then sneaks into the bedroom, where Nadine has just done her first line of coke with Jackie ("The Lights Of Broadway (Reprise)"). At Nadine's request for more, Jackie laments how he can never get enough of anything, culminating in rape ("More").

Mae hears Nadine's muffled screams and Eddie charges in and beats Jackie. Eddie goes wild, threatening everyone as Queenie and Black arrive. When Eddie charges at Queenie, Black hits him. Queenie questions Nadine on what had happened with Jackie, but she refuses to call him out, instead saying she was scared and screamed. Jackie tries to start the party up again and takes out more cocaine. Seeing the coke, Sally goes to him, leaving Madelaine. Madelaine chases after her, but is stopped when Sally asks, "Who's Sally?"

The guests are told to leave by Burrs, and they disappear into the background. Kate confronts Black, telling him that Queenie will choose Burrs and he will have nowhere to go. Burrs and Queenie come to blows as she reveals she knows about his wife ("Love Ain't Nothin'/Welcome To Her Party").

Queenie refuses to let Burrs make up her mind ("What I Need") and leaves with Black. Burrs wonders how many other women could make him feel the way she does, before concluding it is just her ("How Many Women In The World?"). Gold and Goldberg tell him they had no intention of taking him uptown with them, and he begins to put on his vaudeville makeup. Dolores recounts how she used to love the dark, but now she loves the cold hard light that spares no one. She enjoys knowing who has the stuff and who doesn't to survive ("When It Ends").

Finale Queenie and Black lie in bed as Queenie wonders what it is to live in light and love ("This Is What It Is"). Burrs, done up in blackface, mimics the guests, before entering the bedroom ("Marie Is Tricky (Reprise)"). He pulls out a gun and threatens to kill Queenie ("How Many Women In The World? (Reprise)").

Black fights back and Burrs is shot dead and falls on the bed. Kate rushes in and hurries Black to safety. The company does the opening vaudeville, trying to lure Queenie into its revelry ("Queenie Was A Blonde (Reprise)").

Queenie tries, but soon begins to take off her makeup, the company dropping the vaudeville and joining her ("This Is What It Is" (Reprise)). Queenie is bathed in morning light. Scared, unsure but hopeful, she smiles at the dawn.

== Song list ==
The Vaudeville

- Queenie was a Blonde - Company
- Marie Is Tricky - Company, Burrs
- Wild Party - Queenie, Burrs

Promenade of Guests

- Dry - Burrs, Jackie, Madelaine, Sally, Eddie, Mae, Nadine, Brothers D’Armano, Dolores
- My Beautiful Blonde - Brothers D'Armano
- Welcome To My Party - Queenie
- Like Sally - Madelaine
- Breezin’ Through Another Day - Jackie
- Uptown - Brothers D’Armano
- Eddie and Mae - Eddie, Mae
- Gold and Goldberg - Gold, Goldberg
- Moving Uptown - Dolores

The Party

- Black Bottom - Queenie, Company
- Best Friend - Queenie, Kate
- A Little M-M-M - Brothers D’Armano
- Everybody Has Their Secrets - Madelaine
- The Lights Of Broadway - Nadine
- Taboo - Oscar
- Taking Care of the Ladies - Black
- Tabu Dance - Sally, Oscar, Queenie
- Wouldn't It Be Nice? - Burrs
- Lowdown-Down - Queenie
- Gin - Burrs, Company
- Wild - Company
- Need - Madelaine, Company
- Black Is a Moocher - Kate
- People Like Us - Queenie, Black

After Midnight Dies

- After Midnight Dies - Sally
- Golden Boy - Eddie, Brothers D’Armano
- The Movin’ Uptown Blues - Gold, Goldberg
- The Lights of Broadway (Reprise) - Nadine
- More - Jackie
- Love Ain’t Nothin’/Welcome to Her Party - Kate, Burrs
- What I Need - Queenie
- How Many Women in the World? - Burrs
- When It Ends - Dolores

Finale

- This is What It Is - Queenie
- Marie Is Tricky (Reprise) - Burrs
- How Many Women In The World (Reprise) - Burrs
- Queenie Was A Blonde (Reprise) - Company
- This Is What It Is (Reprise) - Queenie, Company

In the London production, "When It Ends" comes after "More".

== Cast ==
Role	Broadway 2000	Off-West End 2017	Off-Broadway 2026
Queenie	Toni Collette	Frances Ruffelle	Jasmine Amy Rogers
Burrs	Mandy Patinkin	John Owen-Jones	Jordan Donica
Mr. Black	Yancey Arias	Simon Thomas	Jelani Alladin
Dolores Montoya	Eartha Kitt	Donna McKechnie	Tonya Pinkins
Jackie	Marc Kudisch	Dex Lee	Claybourne Elder
Kate	Tonya Pinkins	Victoria Hamilton-Barritt	Adrienne Warren
Eddie Mackrel	Norm Lewis	Ako Mitchell	Evan Tyrone Martin
Mae	Leah Hocking	Lizzy Connolly	Lesli Margherita
Nadine	Brooke Sunny Moriber	Bronté Barbé	Maya Rowe
Phil D'Armano	Nathan Lee Graham	Gloria Obianyo	Joseph Anthony Byrd
Oscar D'Armano	Michael McElroy	Genesis Lynea	Wesley J. Barnes
Miss Madelaine True	Jane Summerhays	Tiffany Graves	Meghan Murphy
Sally	Sally Murphy	Melanie Bright	Betsy Morgan
Gold	Adam Grupper	Steven Serlin	KJ Hippensteel
Goldberg	Stuart Zagnit	Sebastian Torkia	Andrew Kober

== Critical reception ==
Ben Brantley of The New York Times called it "a parade of personalities in search of a missing party . . . what has wound up on the stage is a portrait of desperation that itself feels harshly, wantonly desperate." The CurtainUp reviewer wrote: "Overall, it adds up to a polished theatrical entertainment, with a distinctive edginess." The Talkin' Broadway reviewer described the musical as "a dark, sensual, and glittering musical. LaChiusa has written several tuneful, witty, and character driven songs, which George C. Wolfe has expertly arranged and staged around the narrative provided by the source material; an interesting story gets told in appealing music and believable dialogue."

== Awards and nominations ==
=== Original Broadway production ===
Year	Award Ceremony	Category	Nominee	Result
2000	Drama Desk Award	Outstanding Actor in a Musical	Mandy Patinkin	Nominated
2000	Drama Desk Award	Outstanding Actress in a Musical	Toni Collette	Nominated
2000	Drama Desk Award	Outstanding Featured Actress in a Musical	Eartha Kitt	Nominated
2000	Theatre World Award		Toni Collette	Won
2000	Tony Award	Best Musical		Nominated
2000	Tony Award	Best Book of a Musical	Michael John LaChiusa and George C. Wolfe	Nominated
2000	Tony Award	Best Original Score	Michael John LaChiusa	Nominated
2000	Tony Award	Best Actor in a Musical	Mandy Patinkin	Nominated
2000	Tony Award	Best Actress in a Musical	Toni Collette	Nominated
2000	Tony Award	Best Featured Actress in a Musical	Eartha Kitt	Nominated
2000	Tony Award	Best Lighting Design	Jules Fisher and Peggy Eisenhauer	Nominated

=== 2026 Encores! Off-Broadway revival ===
Year	Award	Category	Work	Result	Ref.
2026	Drama League Awards	Outstanding Revival of a Musical		Nominated	
2026	Drama League Awards	Outstanding Direction of a Musical	Lili-Anne Brown	Nominated	
2026	Drama League Awards	Distinguished Performance	Jasmine Amy Rogers	Nominated	

== Comparison with the off-Broadway Wild Party ==
The Michael John LaChiusa and Andrew Lippa versions of The Wild Party are markedly different in their storylines. In Lippa's version, the plot is tightly focused on the central love triangle of Joseph Moncure March's poem, while the LaChiusa play, while also focusing on the love triangle, has fifteen characters, nearly all of whom are given story arcs of their own within the narrative. Within those individual stories, broader themes such as racism, sexism, bisexuality, antisemitism, and the concept of the American Dream are included.

There are major differences in the music and tone of the two shows, as well. While Lippa takes a more abstract, non-date specific approach to his compositions and orchestrations, the LaChiusa score is both more traditional in terms of musical theatre conventions as well as more period with regard to the Roaring Twenties setting.
