= The Set-Up (1949 film) =

1949 film by Robert Wise

- Theatrical release poster
- Directed by: Robert Wise
- Screenplay by: Art Cohn
- Based on: The Set-Up (poem); 1928 poem by Joseph Moncure March
- Produced by: Richard Goldstone
- Starring: Robert Ryan; Audrey Totter; George Tobias
- Cinematography: Milton R. Krasner
- Edited by: Roland Gross
- Music by: C. Bakaleinikoff
- Distributed by: RKO Radio Pictures
- Release date: March 29, 1949 (United States)
- Running time: 72 minutes
- Country: United States
- Language: English

The Set-Up is a 1949 American film noir boxing drama directed by Robert Wise and starring Robert Ryan and Audrey Totter. The screenplay was adapted by Art Cohn from a 1928 narrative poem of the same name by Joseph Moncure March. The Set-Up was the last film Wise made for RKO, and he named it his favorite of the pictures he directed for the studio, as well as one of his top ten of his career.

== Plot ==
Bill "Stoker" Thompson, a 35-year-old has-been boxer, is about to take on a 23-year old, gangster-backed opponent called Tiger Nelson, at the Paradise City Arena. His wife, Julie, fears that this fight may be his last and wants him to forfeit the match. Tiny, Stoker's manager, is sure he will continue to lose fights, so he takes money for a "dive" from a mobster. He is so certain of Stoker's failure that he does not inform the boxer of the set-up.

Stoker and Julie passionately debate whether he should participate in the fight. Julie tells him that she has a headache and won't attend. Stoker says that winning tonight's fight might let him "get a top spot" in his next fight, a fight which might pay him $500 or $600. A $500 prize could allow them to buy a cigar stand or invest in another boxer, Tony Martinez, and start a new life. Julie says she cares more about his well-being than money, but Stoker responds: "If you're a fighter, you gotta fight."

After Stoker departs for the arena, Julie continues to struggle with her fear and desire to support his boxing. Ultimately she doesn't use her ticket to the event, and instead roams the streets surrounding the arena.

At the beginning of the fourth round of what is a vicious match with the much younger and heavily favored Tiger Nelson, Stoker learns about the fix. Even though he is told that Little Boy, a feared gangster, is behind the set-up, he refuses to give up the fight.

Stoker wins the vocal support of blood-thirsty fans who had at first rooted against him. He eventually defeats Nelson. Little Boy exacts revenge by having him beaten in an alley outside the arena. In spite of his gameness against the thugs he is overcome and has his hand irreparably smashed with a brick.

He staggers out of the alley and collapses into Julie's arms. "I won tonight," he tells her, both of them realizing he can never fight again. "Yes," she answers. "You won tonight. We both won tonight."

== Cast ==
- Robert Ryan as Bill "Stoker" Thompson
- Audrey Totter as Julie Thompson
- George Tobias as Tiny
- Alan Baxter as Little Boy
- Wallace Ford as Gus
- Percy Helton as Red
- Hal Fieberling as "Tiger" Nelson
- Darryl Hickman as Shanley
- Kenny O'Morrison as Moore
- James Edwards as Luther Hawkins
- David Clarke as "Gunboat" Johnson
- Phillip Pine as Tony Souza
- Edwin Max as Danny
- Arthur 'Weegee' Fellig (New York photographer) has a cameo as the timekeeper

== Production ==
=== Background ===
In 1947, almost two decades after March's poem was published, RKO paid him approximately $1,000 for the rights. Although March had nearly a decade of Hollywood writing credits during the 1930s, RKO did not ask him to adapt the poem and rejected his offer of help.

The screen adaptation included a number of alterations to the original text. The protagonist's name was changed from Pansy Jones to Stoker Thompson, his race was changed from black to white, he went from being a bigamist to being devotedly married and his beating and subsequent death on a subway track were changed to an alley assault and a shattered hand. The opponent's name was changed from Sailor Gray to Tiger Nelson.

When March finally saw the film, he was horrified by how the story had been de-ethnicized, saying, “The whole point of the narrative had been tossed out the window.”

=== Casting ===
In an audio commentary accompanying the 2004 DVD release of the film, Robert Wise attributes the change in the protagonist's race to the fact that RKO had no star black actors under contract. Although the film did have a black actor (James Edwards) in a minor role as another boxer, Edwards was not considered a star under the existing studio rules. March later commented in an Ebony interview, saying:

[N]ot only [did they throw] away the mainspring of the story, they evaded the whole basic issue of discrimination against the Negro... Hollywood's attitude to the Negro in films has been dictated all too often by box-office considerations: they are afraid of losing money in the Jim Crow South.

Robert Ryan, who was cast as Stoker Thompson, had boxing experience from his time at Dartmouth College, where he was heavyweight champion for four consecutive years.

Wise and Sid Rogell wanted Joan Blondell to play Julie following her performance as Zeena Krumbein in Nightmare Alley, but RKO owner Howard Hughes refused, saying "Blondell looks like she was shot out of the wrong end of a cannon now."

=== Filming ===
Dore Schary, the uncredited executive producer who launched the project at RKO before his 1948 move to MGM, is credited with endowing the film with a real-time narrative structure, three years before the device was used in High Noon. The passage of time is shown throughout the film:

- 9:05 pm: The opening sequence features a clock in the town's square.
- 9:11 pm: An alarm clock wakes Stoker.
- 9:17 pm: Stoker leaves for the fight.
- 9:35 pm: Julie paces with indecision, takes her ticket to the event, and leaves their room. Stoker sees the lights extinguished from across the street and believes that she will be at the match.
- 10:10 pm: Having returned to the room, Julie warms soup on the stove while Stoker is beaten in an alley across the street.
- 10:16 pm: The long shot of the clock and the town square returns for the closing sequence.

Before The Set-Up, Richard Goldstone's production credits had been limited to six Our Gang comedy shorts.

The fight scene, which features an exchange of blows between Stoker and his opponent that is very close to the original poem, was choreographed by former professional boxer Johnny Indrisano. Wise used three cameras to capture the action: one focused on the ring in its entirety, one on the fighters and a third hand-held device to catch details such as a glove connecting with a body.

=== Legal issues ===
RKO Pictures was permitted to view Champion (1949) before its release and noticed troubling similarities between the film and The Set-Up. RKO asked Stanley Kramer, the producer of Champion, to reshoot a similar scene, but Kramer denied any similarities and refused to alter Champion. RKO alleged that Mark Robson, the director of Champion, had access to material from The Set-Up because he was working as a director for the studio when the film was produced, although he did not work on the film itself. In response, in March 1949, RKO rushed The Set-Up for release and sued the filmmakers of Champion in federal court for $500,000 in damages and petitioned for an injunction to halt the release of Champion. In early May, a judge recommended that specific scenes be removed and that the resulting film should then be reviewed by the court to confirm that Champion was not significantly weakened by the deleted sequences. Later in the month, RKO and United Artists settled out of court when United Artists agreed to remove 101 feet of film from Champion (approximately 1% of its total length) and two additional words of dialogue.

RKO and United Artists had been involved in a similar dispute the previous year regarding RKO's The Outlaw (1943) and United Artists' Red River (1948). The case was resolved when United Artists agreed to remove a scene from Red River.

== Reception ==
=== Critical response ===
In a contemporary review for The New York Times, critic Thomas M. Pryor wrote:

This RKO production ... is a sizzling melodrama. The men who made it have nothing good to say about the sordid phase of the business under examination and their roving, revealing camera paints an even blacker picture of the type of fight fan who revels in sheer brutality. The sweaty, stale-smoke atmosphere of an ill-ventilated smalltime arena and the ringside types who work themselves into a savage frenzy have been put on the screen in harsh, realistic terms. And the great expectations and shattered hopes which are the drama of the dressing room also have been brought to vivid, throbbing life in the shrewd direction of Robert Wise and the understanding, colloquial dialogue written into the script by Art Cohn. ... 'The Set-Up' is a real dilly for those who go for muscular entertainment.

Critic Edwin Schallert of the Los Angeles Times wrote:

This is no ordinary feature dealing with winner take all. It is about as non-American as a picture can be from a sports standpoint. ... [The] film is not for sensitive souls but it will make those who see it think—about what the fight game is all about. Ryan scores terrifically. He is so dominant in his portrayal, so excellent and so real that he sometimes seems almost alone in the screen unfoldment. This is the kind of effort that should bid for an Academy Award.

=== Box office ===
The film opened in 13 key markets and grossed $245,000 for the week, becoming the top film in the United States for two weeks.

=== Awards ===
Wins

- 1949 Cannes Film Festival: Best Cinematography, Milton R. Krasner; FIPRESCI Prize, Robert Wise; 1949.

Nominated

- British Academy of Film and Television Arts: BAFTA Film Award, Best Film from Any Source, United States; 1950.

== See also ==
- List of boxing films
