= Lonely Is the Name =

Studio album by Sammy Davis Jr.
- Released: August 1968
- Recorded: 1968
- Genre: Vocal jazz
- Length: 37:02
- Label: Reprise

Sammy Davis Jr. chronology
Sammy Davis Jr. Sings the Complete "Dr. Dolittle" (1967)	Lonely Is the Name (1968)	I've Gotta Be Me (1968)

Lonely Is the Name is a 1968 studio album by Sammy Davis Jr.

== Reception ==
Professional ratings
Review scores
Source	Rating
Allmusic	3.5/5 stars

The Allmusic review by Lindsay Planer awarded the album three and a half stars and said that Davis "once again blended his interminable hipness with a batch of popular standards and fresh interpretations of selections that he had previously delivered in a distinctly different style".

== Track listing ==
1. "Lonely Is the Name" (Bert Kaempfert, Herbert Rehbein, Carl Sigman) — 3:15
2. "Up, Up and Away" (Jimmy Webb) — 3:28
3. "The Good Life" (Sacha Distel, Jack Reardon) — 2:43
4. "Shake, Shake, Shake" (Clark, Resnick) — 3:02
5. "We'll Be Together Again" (Carl Fischer, Frankie Laine) — 2:50
6. "Don't Take Your Time" (Roger Nichols, Tony Asher) — 2:38
7. "Children, Children" (Ken Kaganovitch, Ron Rose) — 3:26
8. Medley: "Uptight (Everything's Alright)"/"You've Got Your Troubles" (Stevie Wonder, Sylvia Moy, Henry Cosby)/(Roger Greenaway, Roger Cook) — 3:04
9. "All That Jazz (From A Man Called Adam)" (Benny Carter, Al Stillman) — 2:16
10. "Ev'ry Time We Say Goodbye" (Cole Porter) — 2:34

== Personnel ==
- Sammy Davis Jr. - vocals
