= Children and Art (album) =

Studio album by Mandy Patinkin
- Released: October 25, 2019
- Label: Nonesuch

Children and Art is an album by Mandy Patinkin, released by Nonesuch Records on October 25, 2019.

== Track listing ==
1. "Going to a Town" (Rufus Wainwright)
2. "Kentucky Avenue"
3. "If I Had a Boat"
4. "From the Air" (Laurie Anderson)
5. "So Long Dad"
6. "Children and Art"
7. "To Be of Use"
8. "My Mom"
9. "Wandering Boy" (Randy Newman)
10. "Fear Itself / Sarabande"
11. "Raggedy Ann"
12. "Refugees / Song of the Titanic"

Track listing adapted from Playbill
