= Walter Marks (composer) =

Walter Marks (born January 15, 1934, in New York) is an American songwriter, playwright, screenwriter, and novelist. He is probably best known for his song "I've Gotta Be Me", recorded by Sammy Davis Jr, Tony Bennett, Michael Jackson and many others. He has also written songs recorded by Barbra Streisand, The Temptations, Della Reese, Little Anthony and the Imperials, Steve Lawrence, Eydie Gorme, and other artists.

== Career ==
He wrote the songs for the Broadway musicals Bajour and Golden Rainbow, the book, music and lyrics for the off-Broadway musical Body Shop, the screenplay and songs for the motion picture The Wild Party (Merchant-Ivory Films – directed by James Ivory). He also wrote the off-Broadway comedy-mystery The Butler Did It.

On television, he won an Emmy award for his music on the PBS Series Getting On, and wrote songs for the ABC series That’s Life, and the NBC Hallmark Hall of Fame production of Pinocchio.

His musical Langston in Harlem was produced in New York City at Urban Stages in April 2010. The show won 4 Audelco/Vivian Robinson Awards for Excellence in Black Theater, including best musical.

His other current theatre projects are Dig Lenny Bruce, a musical about the controversial comedian, and Black Jack, a show about Jack Johnson, the first black heavyweight champion of the world. Most recently, Accentuate the Positive, a show integrating the songs of Johnny Mercer into a book musical, for which Marks has written the libretto.

Walter Marks’ first novel, Dangerous Behavior, a psychological thriller, was published in 2002 in hardcover by Carroll & Graf. The film rights were purchased by Paramount Pictures. His second book, a crime/thriller Death Hampton, will be launched in June 2014 (Top Tier Publishers) on Amazon (print) and Kindle. The sequel The Battle of Jericho was expected to follow later in 2014.

In addition, he has produced and written the musical score for a feature-length documentary film on Hustler publisher Larry Flynt, which is directed by his wife, prizewinning documentary filmmaker, Joan Brooker-Marks.

He lives in Manhattan and East Hampton.

== Works ==
Broadway theatre

- Bajour (1964); music and lyrics
- Golden Rainbow (1968); music and lyrics
- Broadway Follies (1981); music and lyrics

Other musical theatre

- Go Fly a Kite (1966); music and lyrics; music and lyrics also by John Kander and Fred Ebb; written for General Electric's 5th Electric Utility Executives Conference in Williamsburg, Virginia
- Body Shop (1994); Off-Broadway; book, music and lyrics

Novels

- Dangerous Behavior (2002)
- Death Hampton (2014)

Filmography

- Pinocchio (1968)
- Here Comes the Judge (1972); TV movie
- The Wild Party (1975)
- Larry Flynt: The Right to Be Left Alone (2007); documentary
- The Silent Truth (2010); documentary

== See also ==
- I've Gotta Be Me (Sammy Davis, Jr. album)
