= Art Cohn =

American screenwriter

- Cohn, at left, with Mike Todd
- Born: April 5, 1909; New York City, US
- Died: March 22, 1958 (aged 48); Grants, New Mexico, US
- Resting place: Hollywood Forever Cemetery
- Occupations: Sportswriter, screenwriter, author
- Spouse: Marta Frank

Art Cohn (April 5, 1909 – March 22, 1958) was an American sportswriter, screenwriter and author. Cohn and Hollywood producer Mike Todd died in a plane crash in New Mexico in 1958.

== Career ==
=== Sportswriter ===
Cohn was born in New York City. Early in his career he wrote for the Long Beach Press-Telegram. From 1936 to 1943, he was a sportswriter and sports editor for the Oakland Tribune, which published his sports column Cohn-ing Tower (wordplay on "conning tower"). He worked as a press correspondent during World War II. In January 1958, after being away from newspaper work for 14 years, Cohn joined The San Francisco Examiner; in his first column there, he wrote, "Things seem to happen where I happen to be."

Cohn was a controversial opinion writer of the time; he "afflicted the sports world with hard questions about racial equality long before the civil rights movement." He was also a boxing fan.

=== Screenwriter ===
Cohn was a Hollywood screenwriter on many movies, including:

- The Set-Up (1949)
- Stromboli (1950)
- The Tall Target (1951)
- Tomorrow Is Another Day (1951)
- Carbine Williams (1952)
- Glory Alley (1952)
- Red Skies of Montana (1952)
- Fatal Desire (1953)
- The Girl Who Had Everything (1953)
- Tennessee Champ (1954)
- Men of the Fighting Lady (1954)
- Ten Thousand Bedrooms (1957)
- Seven Hills of Rome (1958)

He also wrote teleplays for unsold television pilots Plane for Hire in 1957 and The Celeste Holm Show in 1958.

=== Author ===
Cohn was the author of the Joe E. Lewis biography The Joker Is Wild, published by Random House in 1955, on which the movie The Joker Is Wild (1957) was based. At the time of his death, Cohn was writing a biography of Mike Todd, The Nine Lives of Michael Todd, which was finished by Cohn's wife and released by Random House in 1958.

== Death ==
Cohn died on March 22, 1958, in the same plane crash that killed Broadway theatre and Hollywood film producer Mike Todd, pilot Bill Verner and co-pilot Tom Barclay. The twin-engine, 12-passenger Lockheed Lodestar crashed in bad weather in the Zuni Mountains near Grants, New Mexico. Ironically, Todd had named the plane The Lucky Liz after wife Elizabeth Taylor. Cohn, a resident of Beverly Hills, was survived by his wife, Marta, and his two sons, Ian and Ted.

== Works ==
- Cohn, Art (1955). The Joker is Wild: The Story of Joe E. Lewis. Random House. ASIN B0007DEU8S.
- Cohn, Art (1959). The Nine Lives of Michael Todd. Pocket Books. ASIN B001Q6TNF0.
