= Golden Rainbow (musical) =

- Music: Walter Marks
- Lyrics: Walter Marks
- Book: Ernest Kinoy
- Basis: A Hole in the Head by Arnold Schulman
- Productions: 1968-1969 (Broadway)

Golden Rainbow is a musical in two acts with music and lyrics by Walter Marks and a book by Ernest Kinoy. The musical was based on the film adaptation (by screenwriter Arnold Schulman) of the play A Hole in the Head. It opened on Broadway in 1968. It starred Steve Lawrence and Eydie Gormé until it closed in early 1969.

The stars of Golden Rainbow, Steve Lawrence and Eydie Gormé, were well-known from their extensive work in music, film, and television during the 1950s and 1960s. The musical featured the song "I've Gotta Be Me", released as a single in the late 1960s by both Lawrence and Sammy Davis Jr. The Osmond Brothers sang the title song "Golden Rainbow" on an episode of The Magical World of Disney.

Author William Goldman had a chapter about Golden Rainbow in his book The Season: A Candid Look at Broadway, which was written while the show was preparing for Broadway. The chapter, titled "Washing Garbage," stated that the material suffered from attempts to bring it to expected levels.

== Production history ==
The musical was based on the 1957 play A Hole in the Head by Arnold Schulman which ran for 156 performances and had been turned into a 1959 Frank Capra movie with Frank Sinatra. Music and lyrics were by Walter Marks who had written the music for Bajour. Arthur Storch signed to direct.

The story originally involved a single father looking after his son in Miami whose married brother wants to take custody of the son; the father has a brief romance with a widow. Steve Lawrence was interested in playing the father, and Lawrence's wife Eydie Gorme was going to play the widow. It was the first time they appeared in a Broadway show together, although two years previous Lawrence had starred in What Makes Sammy Run?. Gorme wanted to play a lead role, and the part of the brother was turned into a woman, the father's sister-in-law.

The show had a huge advance order of ticket sales - over $1 million - due to the popularity of its stars. Production was problematic, and Arnold Schulman left the show. The producers tried to replace him with Mike Stewart; instead Ernest Kinoy was hired. There was a large number of previews (43) as various choreographers and book writers were bought to help the production.

Rehearsals started 14 August 1967. The previews for Golden Rainbow began at the Forrest Theatre in Philadelphia on November 28, 1967, moving to its location in New York City at the Shubert Theatre on Broadway on December 27, 1967. The musical officially opened on February 4, 1968 at the Shubert, where it played until November 17, 1968. On November 19, 1968, its run resumed at the George Abbott Theatre on Broadway, where Golden Rainbow played until it closed on January 11, 1969, after 43 previews and 383 performances.

== Awards ==
Although the musical did not win any Tony Awards, child actor Scott Jacoby was nominated for Best Featured Actor in a Musical, and Robert Randolph was nominated for Best Scenic Design.

On September 23 to October 1, 2023, the York Theater produced a limited run Off-Broadway revival of the musical. It starred Max Von Essen as Larry, Benjamin Pajak as Ally and Mara Davi as Judy. The composer and lyricist, Walter Marks, was directly involved in this production.

== Synopsis ==
The show concerns Larry Davis, a man living in Las Vegas and raising his young son alone. His late wife's sister arrives and tries to bring stability to the boy's life, but unintentionally falls in love with her brother-in-law.

== Musical numbers ==
Act I

- "Overture" - Orchestra
- "24 Hours A Day" - Las Vegas
- "We Got Us" - Larry and Ally
- "He Needs Me Now" - Judy
- "Kid" - Larry
- "For Once in Your Life" - Judy, Larry and the boys
- "Taking Care of You" - Judy, Ally and Friends
- "I've Got to Be Me" - Larry

Act II

- "Entr'acte" - Orchestra
- "The Fall of Babylon" - Babylonians
- "Taste" - Lou and friends
- "Desert Moon" - Larry and Judy
- "All in Fun" - Larry and Judy
- "It's You Again" - Judy
- "I've Got to Be Me (Reprise)" - Larry
- "Golden Rainbow" - Larry
- "How Can I Be So Wrong?" - Judy
- "We Got Us (Reprise)" - Larry, Judy and Ally
- "Finale" - Company
