= The Wild Party (poem) =

1926 narrative poem by Joseph Moncure March

The Wild Party is a book-length narrative poem, written by Joseph Moncure March, who also wrote The Set-Up.

Published in 1928 by Pascal Covici, the poem was widely banned, first in Boston, for having content viewed as lewd. The poem was a success notwithstanding, and perhaps in part due to, the controversy surrounding the work. March's subsequent projects were more mainstream.

The poem tells the story of show people Queenie and her lover Burrs, who live in a decadent style that March depicts as unique to Hollywood. They decide to have one of their parties, complete with illegal bathtub gin and the couple's colorful, eccentric and egocentric friends, but the party unfolds with more tumultuous goings-on than planned.

Some love is fire: some love is rust:
But the fiercest, cleanest love is lust.
And their lust was tremendous. It had the feel
Of hammers clanging; and stone; and steel:
And torches of the savage, roaring kind
That rip through iron, and strike men blind:
Of long trains crashing through caverns under
Grey trembling streets, like angry thunder:
Of engines throbbing; and hoarse steam spouting;
And feet tramping; and great crowds shouting.
A lust so savage, they could have wrenched
The flesh from bone, and not have blenched.

A new hardcover edition was released in 1994 with the subtitle The Lost Classic. It featured about fifty black-and-white illustrations by Art Spiegelman, a long-time admirer of the poem. In his introduction to the volume, Spiegelman recalls his first meeting with writer William Burroughs. He indicates that the conversation was stilted until Spiegelman asked if the elderly Burroughs had ever encountered March's poem. "Burroughs had first read the book in 1938, when he was a graduate student at Harvard," Spiegelman wrote. "'The Wild Party,' [Burroughs] mused '...It's the book that made me want to be a writer.'" Spiegelman recalls that Burroughs then recited the opening couplet of the poem, in a manner that gave Spiegelman the impression that Burroughs could have continued the recitation, perhaps even to the final lines.

The Wild Party was adapted into a film version in 1975, and two stage musicals, both produced in New York City in the same 1999–2000 theater season. Michael John LaChiusa's version, directed by George C. Wolfe was mounted on Broadway and the other version, by Andrew Lippa, performed off-Broadway. The Wild Party has been translated into French, German, Spanish, and Danish.

An altered quote from the first two lines of "Part II, ch. 9" was used in the 1959 Ian Fleming novel Goldfinger, although Fleming did not credit March. He also changed the word "fiercest" to "finest".
