= Mandy Patinkin Sings Sondheim =

Mandy Patinkin sings Sondheim

Live album by Mandy Patinkin
- Released: 2002
- Recorded: 2002
- Label: Nonesuch Records

Mandy Patinkin Sings Sondheim is a solo album by Mandy Patinkin, recorded live in concert at Prince Music Theater, Philadelphia in February 2002. The music accompaniment was provided by Paul Ford (piano). All of the songs of Patinkin's repertoire for this album came from works of Stephen Sondheim.

== Track listing ==
=== 1st disc ===
1. Opening (dialogue from Sunday in the Park with George)
2. Lesson #8 (from Sunday in the Park with George)
3. Another Hundred People (from Company)
4. When? (from Evening Primrose)
5. Someone is Waiting (from Company)
6. Johanna (from Sweeney Todd: The Demon Barber of Fleet Street)
7. Green Finch and Linnet Bird (from Sweeney Todd)
8. Pretty Women (from Sweeney Todd)
9. Finishing the Hat (from Sunday in the Park with George)
10. If You Can Find Me, I'm Here (from Evening Primrose)
11. Live, Laugh, Love (from Follies)
12. Live Alone and Like It (from Dick Tracy)
13. Everybody Says Don't (from Anyone Can Whistle)
14. Rich and Happy (from Merrily We Roll Along)
15. Our Time (from Merrily We Roll Along)
16. Broadway Baby (from Follies)
17. Rich and Happy (Part Two) (from Merrily We Roll Along)
18. Uptown, Downtown (cut from Follies)
19. Liaisons (from A Little Night Music)
20. Send in the Clowns (from A Little Night Music)
21. Live, Laugh, Love (reprise) (from Follies)
22. You Could Drive a Person Crazy (from Company)

=== 2nd disc ===
1. Free (from A Funny Thing Happened on the Way to the Forum)
2. Company (from Company)
3. Waiting for the Girls Upstairs (from Follies)
4. Pleasant Little Kingdom / Too Many Mornings (from Follies)
5. Not While I'm Around (from Sweeney Todd)
6. All Things Bright and Beautiful (cut from Follies)
7. It Takes Two (from Into the Woods)
8. In Someone's Eyes [In Buddy's Eyes] (from Follies)
9. Beautiful (from Sunday in the Park with George)
10. Losing My Mind (from Follies)
11. Take the Moment (from Do I Hear a Waltz?)
12. Sunday (from Sunday in the Park with George)
