= Joseph Moncure March =

American poet

- Born: July 27, 1899; New York City, U.S.
- Died: February 14, 1977 (aged 77); Los Angeles, California, U.S.
- Education: DeWitt Clinton High School
- Alma mater: Amherst College
- Occupations: Poet; screenwriter; essayist; editor
- Spouses: Cyra Thomas (m. 1921, divorced); Sue Wise (m. 1928, divorced); Peggy Prior (m. 1932)
- Writing career
- Years active: 1921–1964
- Notable work: The Wild Party; The Set-Up

Joseph Moncure March (July 27, 1899 – February 14, 1977) was an American poet, screenwriter, and essayist, best known for his long narrative poems The Wild Party and The Set-Up.

== Life ==
March was born in New York City in July 1899, where he attended DeWitt Clinton High School. He served in the U.S. Army during World War I, and graduated from Amherst College in 1920 (where he was a protégé of Robert Frost). He married Cyra Thomas in 1921, and they later divorced. He was also married to and divorced from Sue Wise after 1928.

After a four-year stint as managing editor for The Telephone Review, March became managing editor of The New Yorker in 1925, and helped create the magazine's "Talk of the Town" front section. He left the magazine, and wrote the first of his two important long Jazz Age narrative poems, The Wild Party. Due to its risqué content, this violent story of a vaudeville dancer who throws a booze and sex-filled party could not find a publisher until 1928. Once published, however, the poem was a great success despite being banned in Boston. March followed with The Set-Up, a poem about a black boxer who had just been released from prison.

In 1929, March moved to Hollywood to provide additional dialogue for the film Journey's End and, more famously, to turn the silent version of Howard Hughes' classic Hell's Angels into a talkie — a rewrite that brought the phrase "Excuse me while I put on something more comfortable" into the American lexicon. March stayed with Hughes' Caddo Pictures studio for several years, temporarily running the office, overseeing the release of Hell's Angels, and getting into legal trouble after an attempt to steal the script for rival Warner Bros.' flying picture The Dawn Patrol.

March worked as a screenwriter in Hollywood until 1940, under contract to MGM and Paramount and later as a freelancer for Republic Pictures and other studios; he wrote at least 19 produced scripts in his Hollywood career. His most prominent late script is probably the left-leaning John Wayne curio Three Faces West, a knockoff of The Grapes of Wrath that ends with a faceoff between Okies and Nazis.

With his third wife, Peggy Prior (a Pathé screenwriter whom he married in 1932) and her two children, March returned to the East Coast in 1940. During World War II, he worked at a shipbuilding plant in Groton, Connecticut, and wrote features (mostly acid assessments of the movie business) for the New York Times Magazine. In later years, he wrote documentaries for the United States Department of State and industrial films for Ford Motor Company, General Motors, Monsanto Company, American Airlines, and others. Several films starring industrial films icon Thelma "Tad" Tadlock, including Design for Dreaming (1956) and A Touch of Magic (1961) were made from March's rhyming scripts. He retired from writing in 1964 and returned to California, where he died at a nursing home in Los Angeles on February 14, 1977.

== Works and legacy ==
March revised both The Set-Up and The Wild Party in 1968. Most critics deplored these changes, and Art Spiegelman returned to the original text when he published his illustrated version of The Wild Party in 1994. The Set-Up was reprinted in 2022 by Korero Press with illustrations by the Dutch artist Erik Kriek.

Both of March's long poems were made into films. Robert Wise's 1949 film version of The Set-Up loses the poem's racial dimension by casting the white actor Robert Ryan in the lead, while the Merchant Ivory Productions 1975 version of The Wild Party changes March's plot to conflate the poem with the Fatty Arbuckle scandal.

The Wild Party continues to attract new readers and adaptations. In 2000, two separate musical versions played in New York, one on Broadway, composed by Michael John LaChiusa, and the other off-Broadway, composed by Andrew Lippa, with mixed critical and popular success. The Archives & Special Collections at Amherst College holds a substantial collection of March's personal papers, including unpublished poems, scripts, and a memoir entitled Hollywood Idyll.

March's uncle, General Peyton Conway March, was once Chief of Staff of the U.S. Army in World War I. His grandfather was the philologist Francis Andrew March, and his adopted daughter is the retired actress Lori March Williams.

== Bibliography ==
=== Books ===
- The Wild Party. Covici Friede. 1928.
- The Set-up. Covici Friede. 1928.
- Fifteen Lyrics. Fountain Press. 1929.

=== Essays and reporting ===
- March, Joseph Moncure (March 21, 1925). "The age of skepticism". The New Yorker. Vol. 1, no. 5. p. 25.
