= American Film Festival =

Polish film festival

- Location: Wrocław, Poland
- Founded: October 2010
- Language: English, Polish
- Website: americanfilmfestival.pl

American Film Festival is a film festival held annually in October in Wrocław, Poland. The first festival was held from 20 to 24 October 2010. The festival is organized by Stowarzyszenie Nowe Horyzonty and co-funded by the Wrocław Municipality and Polish Ministry of Culture and National Heritage.

== Festival Programme 2010 ==
- Highlights – new American films
- Spectrum – contemporary American cinema
- American docs – documentaries
- On the edge – experimental films
- Retrospective: John Cassavetes
- A decade of independent – independent films
- Classic films

On the first edition of the festival, audience award in the category of "Spectrum" was awarded to the film Winter's Bone by Debra Granik. The award for "American Docs" was awarded to the film The Two Escobars by Jeff and Michael Zimbalist.

== Festival programme 2011 ==
The second edition took place on 15–20 November 2011.

- Highlights – new American films
- Spectrum – contemporary American cinema
- American docs – documentaries
- On the edge – experimental films
- All That Jazz
- Retrospective: Todd Solondz
- Retrospective: Joe Swanberg
- Retrospective: Terrence Malick
- Retrospective: Billy Wilder

On the second edition of the festival, audience award in the category of "Spectrum" was awarded to the film Somewhere Tonight by Michael Di Jiacomo. The award for "American Docs" was awarded to the film Sing Your Song by Susanne Rostock.

== Festival programme 2012 ==
The third edition took place on 13–18 November 2012.

- Highlights – new American films
- Spectrum – contemporary American cinema
- American docs – documentaries
- On the edge – experimental films
- Retrospective: Jerry Schatzberg
- Retrospective: Wes Anderson
- Retrospective: Nicholas Ray
- Retrospective: Universal Pictures famous horror movies

On the third edition of the festival, audience award in the category of "Spectrum" was awarded to the film Safety Not Guaranteed by Colin Trevorrow. The award for "American Docs" was awarded to the film How to Survive a Plague by David France.

== Festival programme 2013 ==
The fourth edition took place on 22–27 October 2013.

- Highlights – new American films. The Wrocław festival will be inaugurated by the newest film from American cinema master Jim Jarmusch – presented in the main competition at the festival in Cannes, the “vampire melodrama” Only Lovers Left Alive.
- Spectrum – contemporary American cinema
- American docs – documentaries
- Festival Favorites Ale Kino+ presents
- On the edge – experimental films
- Retrospective: Indie Star Award: is given out for stars of independent American cinema and will be received by producer Christine Vachon, founder of the cult production company Killer Films
- Retrospective: Shirley Clarke
- Retrospective: Masterpieces of American cinema. 90 years of Warner Bros.

On the fourth edition of the festival, audience award in the category of "Spectrum" was awarded to the film Short Term 12 by Destin Cretton. The award for "American Docs" was awarded to the film Big Easy Express by Emmett Malloy.
