= Belafonte '89 =

Live album by Harry Belafonte
- Released: 1989
- Recorded: November 29–30, 1988 in Ravensburg, Germany
- Genre: Pop
- Label: EMI
- Producer: Harry Belafonte, Richard Cummings

Harry Belafonte chronology
Paradise in Gazankulu (1988)	Belafonte '89 (1989)	An Evening with Harry Belafonte and Friends (1997)

Professional ratings
Review scores
Source	Rating
Allmusic	2.5/5 stars

Belafonte '89 is a live album by Harry Belafonte, released in 1989. A truncated version of the album was released in the U.S., featuring only 10 out of 15 tracks. The international CD release was also truncated, featuring 13 tracks. It was also released in Germany as Stationen in 1990, and 1993. The LP & CD releases of Stationen from 1990 contain all 15 tracks, with the LP version consisting of 2 LPs.

== Track listing ==
1. "The Wave" (Jake Holmes, Richard Cummings, The Soul Brothers) – 4:20
2. "Kwela" (Holmes, S. M. Nkabinda) – 6:36
3. "Island In The Sun" (Lord Burgess, Harry Belafonte) – 5:04
4. "Skin to Skin" (Holmes, Godfrey Nelson) – 4:50
5. "Paradise in Gazankulu" (Holmes, Oben Ngobeni) – 8:30
6. "Jamaica Farewell" (Burgess) – 5:49
7. "Try To Remember" (Tom Jones, Harvey Schmidt) – 4:36
8. "Sing for the Song" (Bob Gibson) – 4:20
9. "Matilda" (Thomas) – 8:46
10. "Martin Luther King" (Holmes) – 6:46
11. "Global Carnival" (Holmes, Alistair Coakley) – 5:32
12. "We Make Love" (Holmes) – 4:19
13. "Hava Nageela" (Traditional) – 3:49
14. "Did You Know" (Holmes) – 4:45
15. "Day-O (The Banana Boat Song)" (William Attaway, Irving Burgie) – 5:35

== Personnel ==
- Harry Belafonte – vocals
- Diane Reeves – vocals on "Skin to Skin"
- Demetrius Harvey – vocals on "Try to Remember"
- Richard Cummings – keyboards, piano
- Jose Neto – guitar
- Angus Nunes – bass
- Neil Clarke – African and Latin percussion
- Chi Sharpe – African and Latin percussion
- Sipho Kunene – drums
- Benny Russell – saxophone, flute, pennywhistle
- Sharon Brooks – background vocals
- Deborah Sharpe – background vocals
- Ty Stephens – background vocals
- Cheryl Carter – background vocals
- Dwight Twiddle – background vocals
- Johan Beckles – background vocals
- Renee Crutcher – background vocals
- Demetrius Harvey – background vocals

Production notes:

- John Cartwright – producer
- Harry Belafonte – producer, liner notes
- Richard Cummings – conductor, arranger
- David Belafonte – assistant producer, mixing
- Bob Burnham – engineer, assistant producer
