= Ameris Bank Amphitheatre =

Amphitheater in Georgia, USA

Coordinates: 34.054499°N 84.307033°W

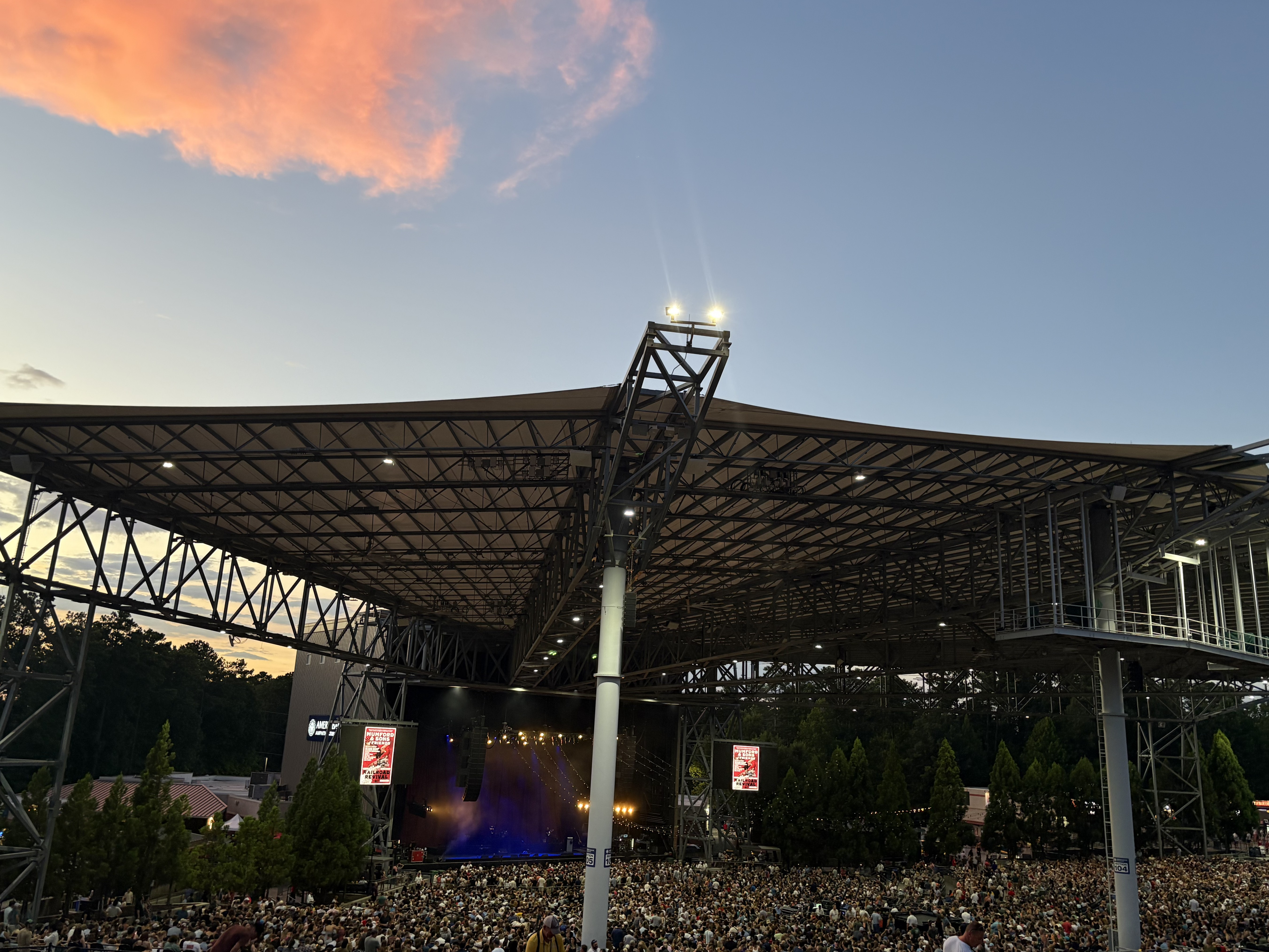
- The venue during the 2025 Railroad Revival Tour
- Interactive map of Ameris Bank Amphitheatre
- Former names: Verizon Wireless Amphitheatre (2008-17); Verizon Amphitheatre (2017-19)
- Address: 2200 Encore Pkwy; Alpharetta, GA 30009-4837
- Location: Metro Atlanta
- Operator: Live Nation
- Capacity: 12,000

Construction
- Opened: May 10, 2008

Website
- Venue Website

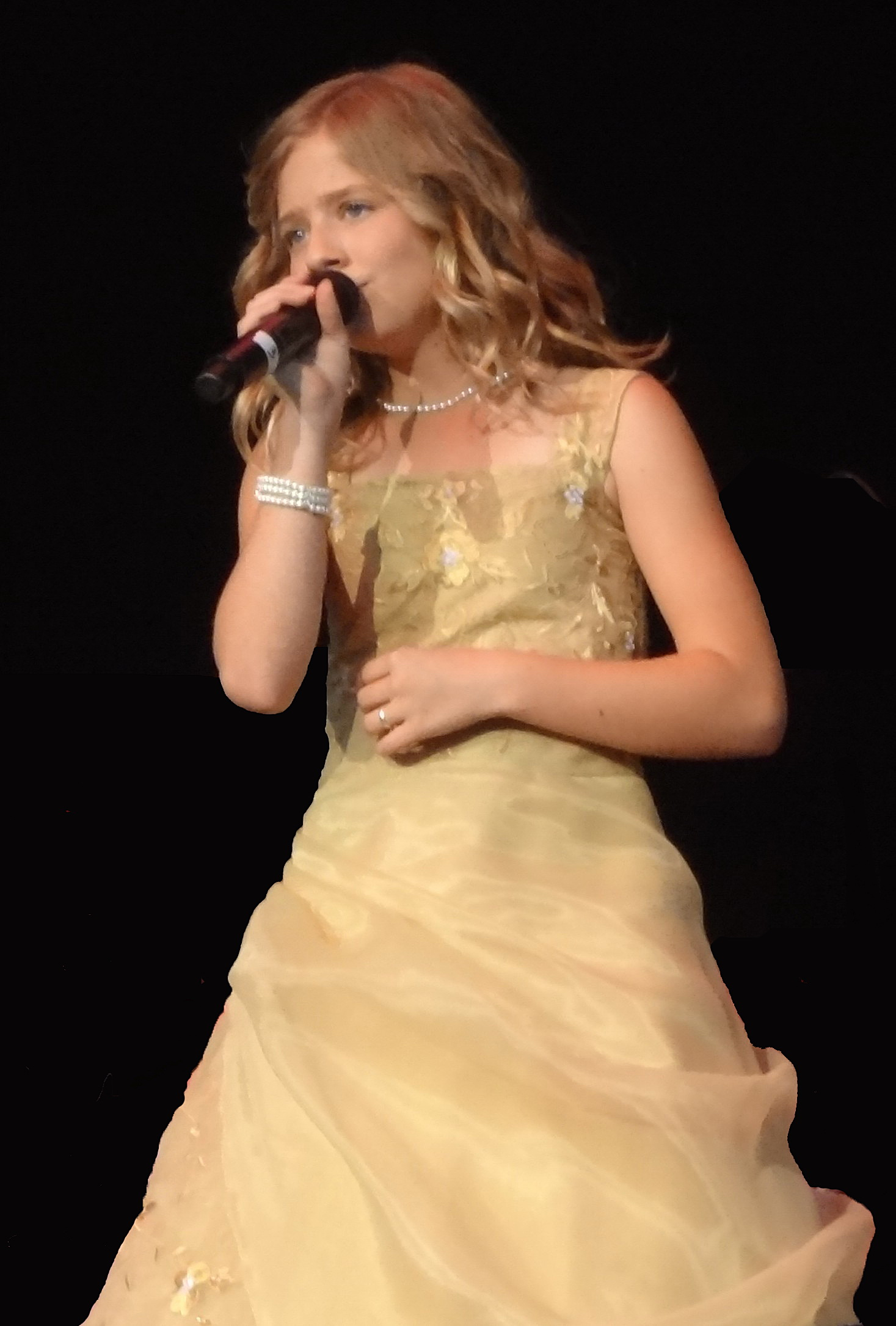
Jackie Evancho in concert at the amphitheatre in June 2012

The Ameris Bank Amphitheatre (formerly Verizon Amphitheatre) is a contemporary amphitheatre, located in the northern Atlanta suburb of Alpharetta, Georgia, United States.

The amphitheatre mainly hosts shows by popular music artists, comedians and themed symphony concerts by the Atlanta Symphony Orchestra, the latter opened the venue with a performance on May 10, 2008.

The venue opened as Verizon Wireless Amphitheatre at Encore Park in 2008. In January 2017, it became known as Verizon Amphitheatre. In December 2018, the venue’s naming rights were purchased by Ameris Bank.

== See also ==
- List of contemporary amphitheatres
