= Buck and the Preacher =

1972 film by Sidney Poitier

- Film Poster
- Directed by: Sidney Poitier
- Written by: Ernest Kinoy
- Produced by: Joel Gilckman
- Starring: Sidney Poitier; Harry Belafonte; Ruby Dee; Cameron Mitchell
- Cinematography: Alex Phillips Jr.
- Edited by: Pembroke J. Herring
- Music by: Benny Carter
- Production companies: E & R Productions; Belafonte Enterprises
- Distributed by: Columbia Pictures
- Release dates: March 1972 (London); April 26, 1972 (Detroit)
- Running time: 102 minutes
- Country: United States
- Language: English

Buck and the Preacher is a 1972 American Western film released by Columbia Pictures, written by Ernest Kinoy and directed by Sidney Poitier. Poitier also stars in the film alongside Harry Belafonte and Ruby Dee.

This is the first film Sidney Poitier directed. Vincent Canby of The New York Times said Poitier "showed a talent for easy, unguarded, rambunctious humor missing from his more stately movies".

This film broke Hollywood Western traditions by casting black actors as central characters and portraying both tension and solidarity between African Americans and Native Americans in the late 19th century. The notable blues musicians Sonny Terry, Brownie McGhee, and Don Frank Brooks performed in the film's soundtrack, composed by jazz great Benny Carter.

== Plot ==
Set in the late 1860s in the Kansas Territory shortly after the American Civil War, a former soldier named Buck leads wagon trains of African Americans from Louisiana west to the unsettled territories of Kansas. In order to ensure safe passage and food for his company, Buck negotiates with the Native Americans in the area. He pays them, and in turn they allow him to kill limited numbers of buffalo to eat, and to pass through their land providing they do it quickly.

A group of violent white men (led by Deshay) are hired by plantation owners in Louisiana to raid the African American wagon trains and settlements to either scare them back to Louisiana or kill them. The raiders attempt to kill Buck by setting a trap at his home. However, warned by his wife, Ruth, he escapes. While in flight he chances across Reverend Willis Oaks Rutherford, a shady individual masquerading as a preacher, and forces the preacher to switch horses with him. Although Preacher initially had a desire to get even with Buck, he changes his mind and decides to work with Buck after seeing the carnage the white raiders inflict on the African American travelers. Buck, Ruth and Preacher do whatever it takes to get the wagon train west, including ambushing some of the raiders in a brothel, robbing a bank, and when necessary taking on the entire band of raiders going up against them.

== Cast ==
- Sidney Poitier as Buck
- Harry Belafonte as Preacher
- Ruby Dee as Ruth
- Cameron Mitchell as Deshay
- Denny Miller as Floyd
- Nita Talbot as Madame Esther
- James McEachin as Kingston
- Clarence Muse as Cudjo
- Enrique Lucero as Indian Chief
- Lynn Hamilton as Sarah
- Julie Robinson as Sinsie

== Production background ==
Buck and the Preacher was one of the first films directed by an African American telling the story of black Americans fighting against the white majority. Poitier directed the film and it was produced by Belafonte Enterprises, Columbia Pictures Corporation, and E & R Productions Corp. The film was filmed in Durango, Mexico, as well as in Kenya. It was released in the United States in 1972.

Poitier and Belafonte initially hired Joseph Sargent as the director of the film. However, Poitier fired him after a few days of shooting, noting that Sargent's approach lacked "important ethnic qualities" that would allow "black people and minorities in general to find in Buck and the Preacher a certain substance, a certain nourishment, a certain complement of the self." Even though this would be the first feature he directed, Poitier assumed the role of director. It took Poitier 45 days to shoot the film, which he edited during the shooting of The Organization, in which he also starred.

In regards to how Poitier felt directing, he stated, "I rolled my camera for the first time. I tell you, after three or four takes of that first scene, a calm came over me. A confidence surged through my whole body… and I, as green as I was, had a touch for this new craft I had been courting from a distance for many, many years." In the 2020 biography Sidney Poitier Black and White: Sidney Poitier's Emergence in the 1960s as a Black Icon, Powers describes the film as Poitier's "second Everest", explaining that "directing a black film about black people rising above white people during a desperate period when white people were forced, by law, to release black people from slavery was a huge task".

== Themes ==
=== Civil rights ===
Civil rights themes can be seen throughout the film. Allegorical parallels can be drawn between the film's plot and the main tenets of the Civil Rights Movement of the 1960s.

The violence of the marauders preventing the former slaves from settling their own land parallels the housing and property ownership issues of the 1960s. Additionally, the film comments on the systemic racism of the twentieth century by showing how 19th-century laws meant to prevent racism and violence were not enforced.

The film also has themes shared by other blaxploitation films, depicting white people as sadistic and unable to see beyond racist stereotypes. In one scene, Preacher improvises an over-the-top sermon to get a group of marauders to let down their guards, and as soon as they do, Buck enters and kills them. This usage of racist stereotypes as an infiltration tactic can be seen in other black-power films such as The Spook Who Sat by the Door. However, the screenplay of the film is set up to look beyond the clear good-and-bad dichotomy in the way it also highlights "all the people who are doing what they do because they don't know what else to do or because they're getting on with their lives".

=== Exodusters ===
Following the Civil War, around 1879, African Americans in Mississippi, Louisiana, and Tennessee fled to Kansas seeking work and new lives away from the South. These migrants are known as "Exodusters." While there was work for them in the South and slavery had technically ended, the powerful white leaders of Southern states did all they could to prevent African Americans from owning land. These lawmakers also created sharecropping which, in effect, continued slavery. Also, the Exodusters had no interest in sharecropping or growing cotton or other cash crops for the white people who were once slave owners. The work they sought in Kansas was subsistence farming.

With the independence of African Americans in the South came a violent reaction from Southern whites. The scarce law enforcement of rural areas mixed with Confederates' bitterness about their loss of the Civil War (which was frequently blamed on African Americans) led to groups of former Confederate soldiers raiding settlements of former slaves trying to make their own way. These marauders would steal supplies, horses, food, and destroy anything they didn't take. This violence only gave the Exodusters more reason to flee to Kansas.

== Release ==
The film was screened October 30, 1971 at Loew's Theatre in Richmond, Virginia for the benefit of Virginia Union University in what was originally billed as its world premiere but later referred to as a preview by Poitier to avoid the film being reviewed. The film opened at the Columbia cinema in London in March 1972. In the United States, the film opened in the week ended April 26, 1972 at 3 Palms and Mercury Theatres in Detroit before opening 2 days later at the Loop Theatre in Chicago, grossing $155,000 in its first week from the four theatres.

== Reception ==
Initially, critics were somewhat split in their reviews. Gordon Gow, a critic for Films and Filming, said that the movie was "breezy stuff and highly entertaining." He went on to say that Belafonte's performance was humorous even though it was somewhat over-the-top for the overall historical realism that the film is going for. Other reviews were not so positive. Writers for The Motion Picture Guide focused more on the negative stereotypes presented in the film. "Stereotypes abound in this foolish, witless western, a production misusing the fine black talent in its cast." The later reviews are significantly more positive. On Rotten Tomatoes, Buck and the Preacher holds a rating of 84% from 44 reviews with the consensus: "Sidney Poitier's directorial debut may be more steady than inspired, but Harry Belafonte's live-wire performance and a Black perspective on classic Western tropes make for a refreshing addition to the genre." Metacritic, which uses a weighted average, assigned the film a score of 65 out of 100, based on 16 critics, indicating "generally favorable" reviews.

According to Poitier, the film was not an immediate success financially. The film was made on a budget of $2 million and Poitier claimed that it broke even at the box office. In fact, some alleged that the poor financial reception resulted in Poitier losing a film deal with Columbia Pictures. The initial lackluster response from audiences may have been caused by how different Buck is than typical Blaxploitation heroes such as Shaft and Coffy who live in contemporary society. The old west setting may have been too far removed from the African American audiences viewing the film. Additionally, the fact that white heroes were typically the centerpieces of American westerns may have also contributed to the foreignness of the film to its target audience.

In Philip Powers' 2020 book "Sidney Poitier Black and White", there is a chapter devoted to the making of Buck and the Preacher, illustrating the fact that the film was far from the financial flop some have claimed; millions of Americans bought tickets to see it in theatres. Powers also analyzed the full range of reviews after it was released. While Poitier's "direction of Buck and the Preacher received mixed reviews... [it was] due to the fact that most film critics and reviewers in 1972 didn't have a basic understanding of what a director does, from pre-production through to the end of post-production – and unfortunately it remains as true today as it was then – the comments about Poitier's effort as a first-time director are interesting for their historical context more than their perspicacity."

== See also ==
- List of American films of 1972
