= An Evening with Harry Belafonte and Friends =

Live album by Harry Belafonte
- Released: August 26, 1997
- Genre: Pop, folk, world
- Length: 68:43
- Label: Island
- Producer: David Belafonte

Harry Belafonte chronology
Belafonte '89 (1989)	An Evening with Harry Belafonte and Friends (1997)

Professional ratings
Review scores
Source	Rating
Allmusic	4.5/5 stars

An Evening with Harry Belafonte and Friends is the final album by Harry Belafonte, released in 1997. The album is the soundtrack of a concert, televised by PBS in March 1997. It was also released as a concert video. In 2003 the concert video was also released on DVD.

== Track listing ==
1. "We Are the Wave" (Jake Holmes, Richard Cummings, The Soul Brothers) – 3:52
2. "Turn the World Around" (Harry Belafonte, Robert Freedman) – 6:14
3. "Island in the Sun" (Lord Burgess, Harry Belafonte) – 4:36
4. "Skin to Skin" (Holmes, Godfrey Nelson) – 4:44
5. "Kwela (Listen to the Man)" (Holmes, S. M. Nkabinda) – 5:33
6. "Eyala" (Richard Bona) – 3:46
7. "Matilda" (Norman Span) – 9:50
8. "Dangerous Times" (Holmes) – 4:50
9. "Try to Remember" (Tom Jones, Harvey Schmidt) – 4:29
10. "Paradise in Gazankulu" (Holmes, Oben Ngobeni) – 7:15
11. "Eyando" (Bona) – 3:02
12. "Jamaica Farewell" (Burgess) – 6:44
13. "Day-O (The Banana Boat Song)" (William Attaway, Irving Burgie) – 7:40

== Personnel ==
- Harry Belafonte – vocals
- Richard Bona – solos on "Eyala" and "Eyando", guitar
- Mamadou Ba – bass
- Morris Goldberg – woodwinds
- Dan Carillo – guitar
- Domonic Kanza – guitar
- Galen "Lenny" Underwood – keyboards, background vocals
- James R. Sebastian – drums
- Edison Da Silva – percussion
- Emedin Rivera – percussion
- LaTanya Hall – background vocals
- Gwendolyn Jackson – background vocals
- Sam McKelton – background vocals
- Fluitt – background vocals

Production notes:

- David Belafonte – producer, engineer, mixing
- Harry Belafonte – executive producer, liner notes
- Kooster McCallister – engineer
- Michael Halsband – photography
- Joanne Savio – photography
