= Julie Robinson Belafonte =

American actress and costume designer (1928–2024)

Julia Mary Belafonte (September 14, 1928 – March 9, 2024) was an American dancer, actress and costume designer. She danced with the Dunham School of Dance and Theater for six years and also acted. After marrying Harry Belafonte, she became involved in activities of the Civil right movement. She was also the mother of actress Gina Belafonte.

== Early life and education ==
Robinson was born on September 14, 1928 in Washington Heights, New York City. She was the daughter of George and Clara Robinson. Her father was a plastics manufacturer and a member of the Communist Party. Both her parents were of Russian-Jewish descent.

Robinson attended the progressive Little Red School House and the High School of Music and Art.

== Career ==
Robinson earned a scholarship to attend the black dance company, Dunham School of Dance and Theater, when she was 16. She danced with company for six years, including teaching for 3 years. She was for a time the only white dancer in the company. Robinson and Dunham were lifelong friends. In 1946, Robinson gave dance lessons to Marlon Brando. She also appeared in a stage production of A Streetcar Named Desire. In 1955, she helped the Dunham company out with rehearsals when one of their dancers got sick.

Robinson moved to Los Angeles in the early 1950s where continued to dance before gaining roles as an actress. Robinson's first role was in Vincent Minnelli's Kismet followed by the role Rachel in Lust for Life with Kurt Douglas and Anthony Quinn. In 1954, she appeared in the film, Carmen Jones, with future husband, Harry Belafonte, and in the film Mambo as a dancer.

Robinson helped raise funds for the civil rights movement. She is credited with helping to co-found the women’s division of the Student Nonviolent Coordinating Committee and helping to organise a women’s march against the Vietnam War with Coretta Scott King.

In March 1965, she helped corral celebrities at the "Stars for Freedom" rally in Montgomery, Alabama on the 24 March 1965 as part of the Selma to Montgomery marches. In April 1965, she helped organise a black tie event to raise money for voter registration drives.

Robinson had roles in the film A Safe Place (1971) and Buck and the Preacher (1972). For a time, she was also a partner in an antiques' business.

In 2012, Robinson produced the documentary "Flags, Feathers, and Lies".

== Awards and honors ==
In 1996, she obtained an honorary doctor of laws from McMaster University for her activism and advocacy for civil rights.

== Personal life ==
Robinson was romantically linked with Marlon Brando before she met Harry Belafonte in 1954 while the pair were both filming Carmen Jones. The couple married in Tecate, Mexico on March 8, 1957. They went on to have two children. The pair divorced in 2007.

Robinson died on March 9, 2024 in Los Angeles. She was 95.
