= Harry Belafonte =

American singer and actor (1927–2023)

The Honourable Harry Belafonte OM
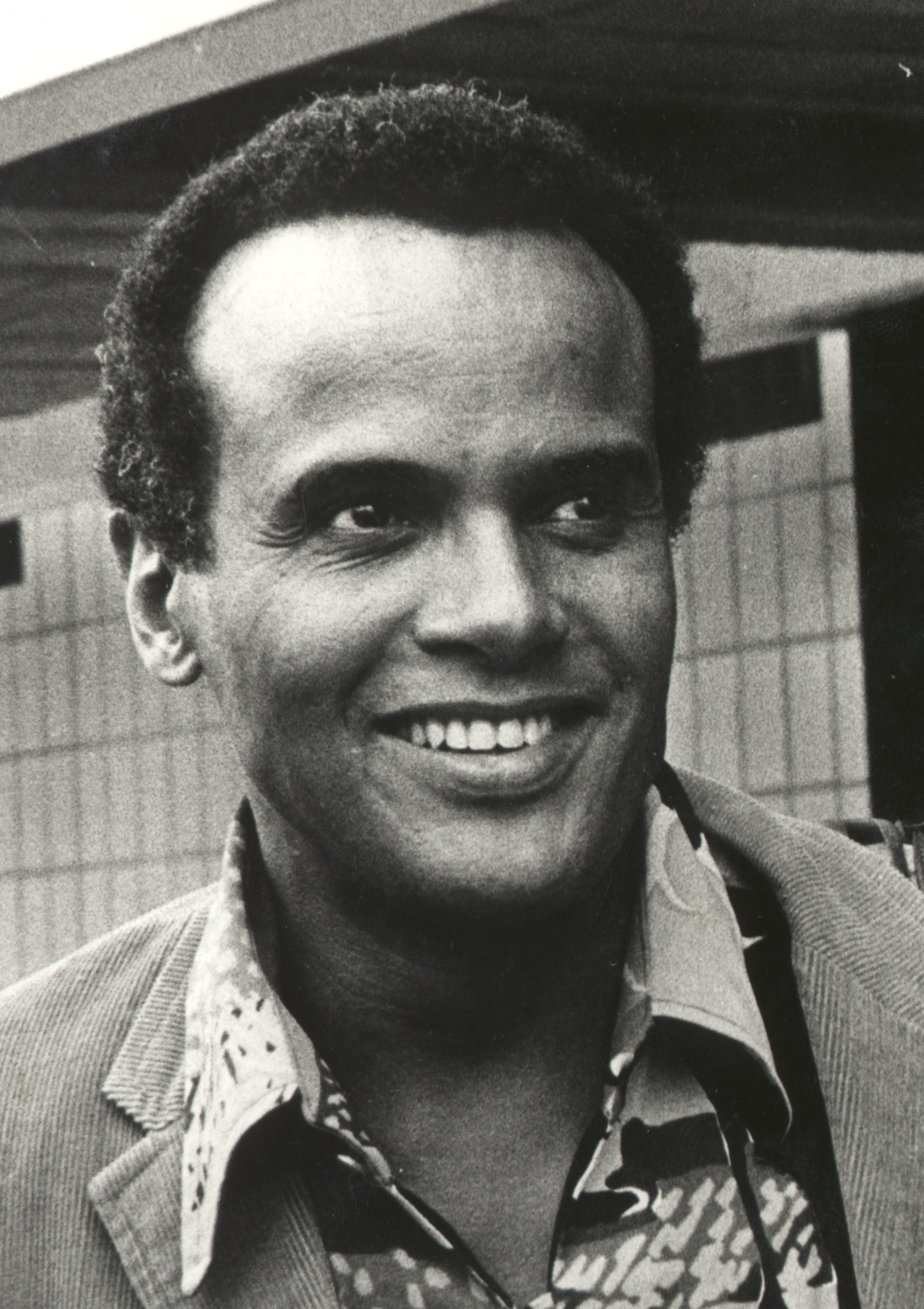
- Belafonte in 1970
- Born: Harold George Bellanfanti Jr. March 1, 1927; New York City, U.S.
- Died: April 25, 2023 (aged 96); New York City, U.S.
- Other names: Harold George Belafonte Jr.; Harry Bellanfanti Jr.; "King of Calypso"
- Occupations: Singer; actor; activist
- Years active: 1948–2023
- Works: Discography
- Political party: Democratic
- Spouses: Marguerite Byrd (m. 1948; div. 1957) Julie Robinson (m. 1957; div. 2004) Pamela Frank (m. 2008)
- Children: 4, including Shari and Gina
- Musical career
- Genres: Calypso; mento; pop; folk; world
- Instrument: Vocals

Harry Belafonte (/ˌbɛləˈfɒnti/ BEL-ə-FON-tee; born Harold George Bellanfanti Jr.; March 1, 1927 – April 25, 2023) was an American singer, actor, and civil rights activist who popularized calypso music with international audiences in the 1950s and 1960s. Belafonte's career breakthrough album Calypso (1956) was the first million-selling LP by a single artist.

Belafonte was best known for his recordings of "Day-O (The Banana Boat Song)", "Jump in the Line (Shake, Senora)", "Jamaica Farewell", and "Mary's Boy Child". He recorded and performed in many genres, including blues, folk, gospel, show tunes, and American standards. He also starred in films such as Carmen Jones (1954), Island in the Sun (1957), Odds Against Tomorrow (1959), Buck and the Preacher (1972), and Uptown Saturday Night (1974). He made his final feature film appearance in Spike Lee's BlacKkKlansman (2018).

Harry Belafonte considered the actor, singer, and activist Paul Robeson to be a mentor. Belafonte was also a close confidant of Martin Luther King Jr. during the civil rights movement of the 1950s and 1960s and acted as the American Civil Liberties Union celebrity ambassador for juvenile justice issues. He was also a vocal critic of the policies of the George W. Bush and first Donald Trump administrations.

Belafonte won three Grammy Awards, including a Grammy Lifetime Achievement Award, a Primetime Emmy Award, and a Tony Award. In 1989, he received the Kennedy Center Honors. He was awarded the National Medal of Arts in 1994. In 2014, he received the Jean Hersholt Humanitarian Award at the academy's 6th Annual Governors Awards and in 2022 was inducted into the Rock and Roll Hall of Fame in the Early Influence category. He is one of the few performers to have received an Emmy, Grammy, Oscar, and Tony (EGOT), although he won the Oscar in a non-competitive category.

== Early life ==
Belafonte was born Harold George Bellanfanti Jr. on March 1, 1927, at Lying-in Hospital in Harlem, New York City, the son of Jamaican-born parents Harold George Bellanfanti Sr. (1900–1990), who worked as a chef, and Melvine Love (1906–1988), a housekeeper. There are disputed claims of his father's place of birth, which is also stated as Martinique. Belafonte also had a younger brother named Dennis.

His mother was the child of a Scottish Jamaican mother and an Afro-Jamaican father, and his father was the child of an Afro-Jamaican mother and a Dutch-Jewish father of Sephardic Jewish descent. Belafonte was raised Catholic and attended parochial school at St. Charles Borromeo.

From 1932 to 1940, Belafonte lived with one of his grandmothers in her native country of Jamaica, where he attended Wolmer's Schools. Upon returning to New York City, he had a brief, unsuccessful stay at George Washington High School. It was later reported that undiagnosed dyslexia and blindness in one eye contributed to his academic difficulties. After dropping out of high school, he joined the U.S. Navy and served during World War II. In the 1940s, he worked as a janitor's assistant, during which a tenant gave him, as a gratuity, two tickets to see the American Negro Theater. He fell in love with the art form and befriended Sidney Poitier, who was also financially struggling. They regularly purchased a single seat to local plays, trading places in between acts, after informing the other about the progression of the play.

At the end of the 1940s, Belafonte took classes in acting at the Dramatic Workshop of The New School in New York City with German director Erwin Piscator alongside Marlon Brando, Tony Curtis, Walter Matthau, Bea Arthur, and Poitier, while performing with the American Negro Theater. He subsequently received a Tony Award for his participation in the Broadway revue John Murray Anderson's Almanac (1954). He also starred in the 1955 Broadway revue 3 for Tonight with Gower Champion.

== Musical career ==
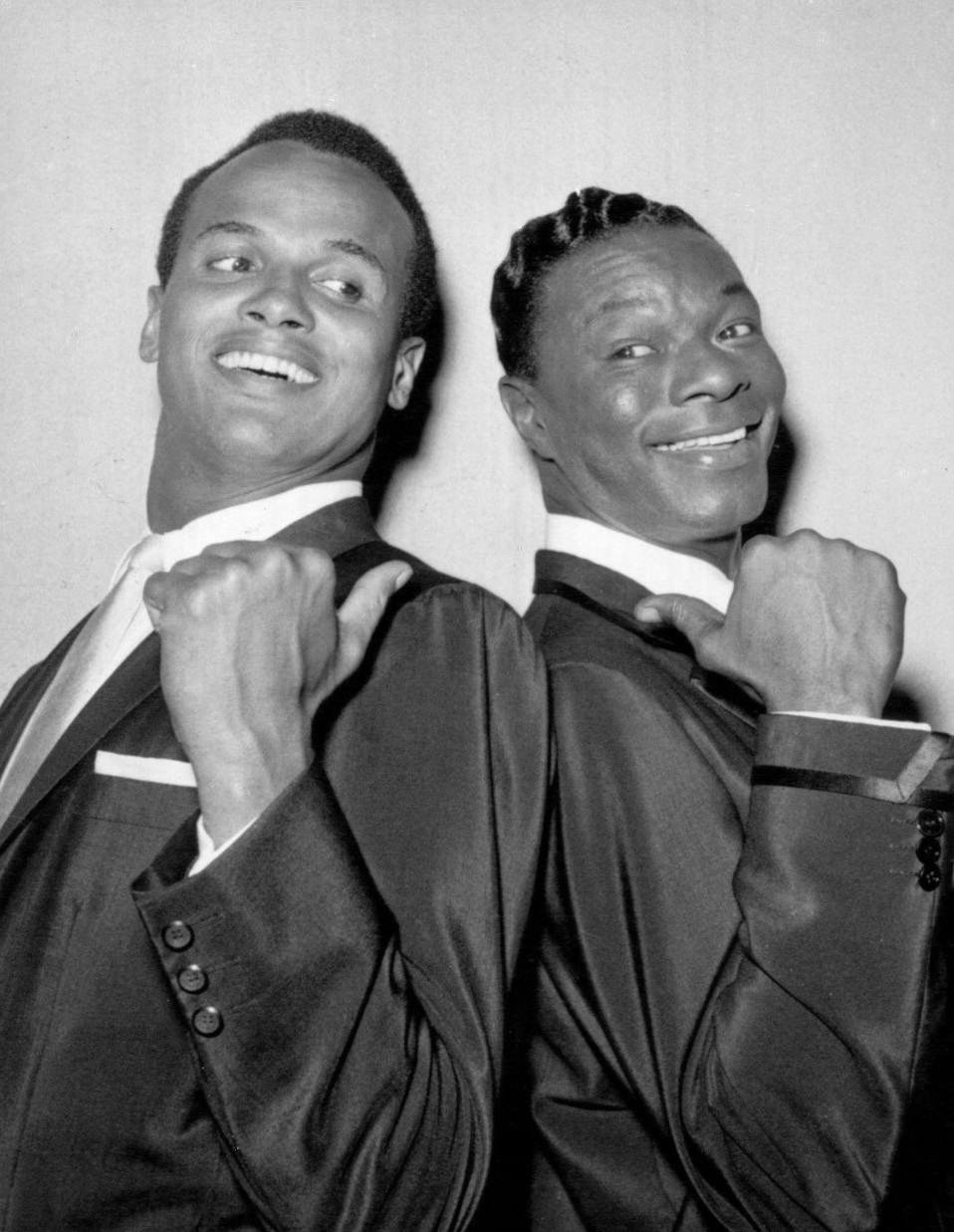
Belafonte with Nat King Cole in 1957

=== Early years (1949–1955) ===
Belafonte started his career in music as a club singer in New York to pay for his acting classes. The first time he appeared in front of an audience, he was backed by the Charlie Parker band, which included Charlie Parker, Max Roach, and Miles Davis, among others. He launched his recording career as a pop singer on the Roost label in 1949, but quickly developed a keen interest in folk music, learning material through the Library of Congress' American folk songs archives. Along with guitarist and friend Millard Thomas, Belafonte soon made his debut at the jazz club The Village Vanguard. In 1953, he signed a contract with RCA Victor, recording exclusively for the label until 1974. Belafonte also performed during the Rat Pack era in Las Vegas. Belafonte's first widely released single, which went on to become his "signature" audience participation song in virtually all his live performances, was "Matilda", recorded April 27, 1953. Between 1953 and 1954, he was a cast member of the Broadway musical revue and sketch comedy show John Murray Anderson's Almanac where he sang "Mark Twain", of which he was also the songwriter.

=== Rise to fame (1956–1958) ===
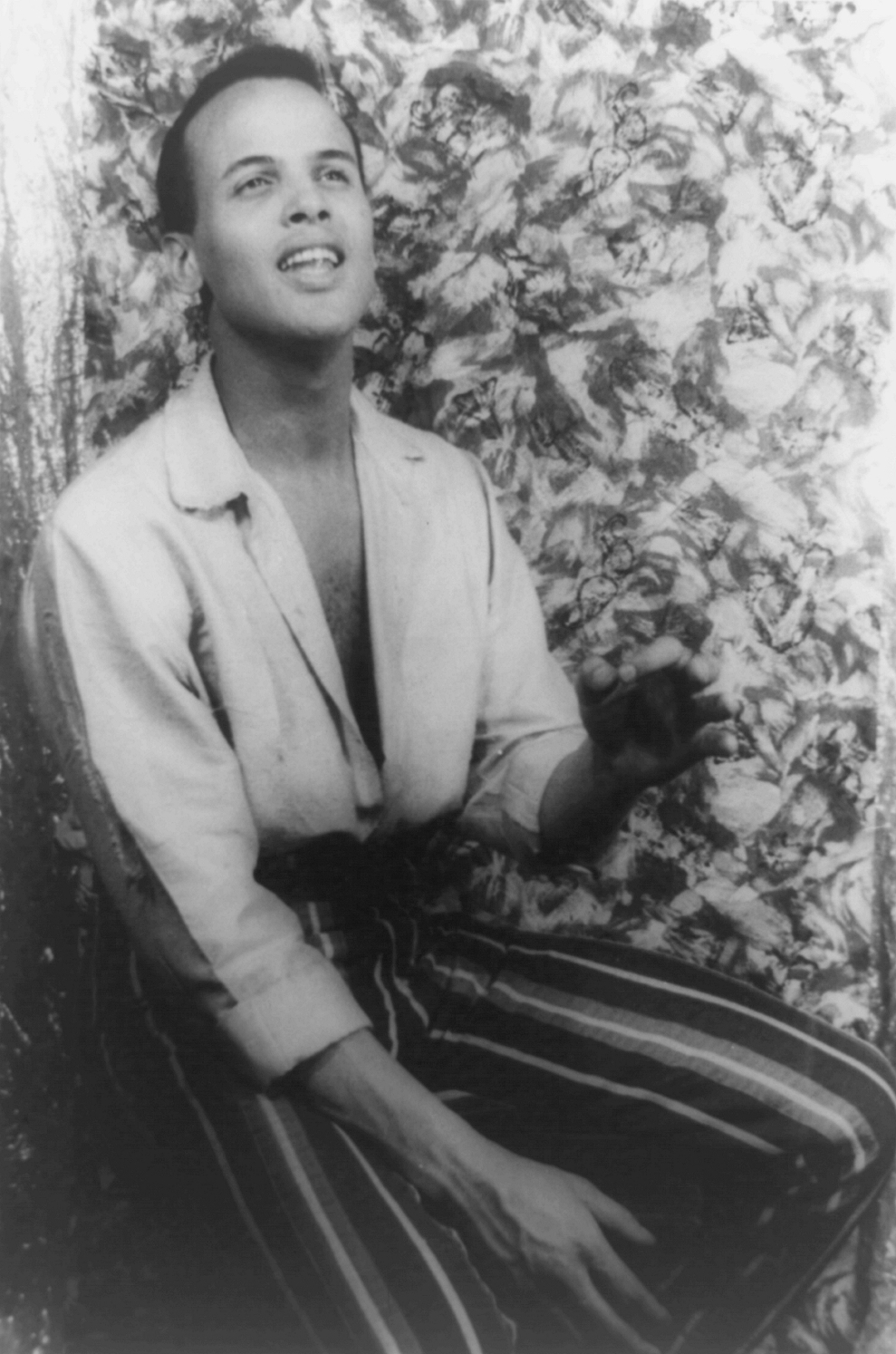
Harry Belafonte in John Murray Anderson's Almanac on Broadway, photographed by Carl Van Vechten, 1954

Following his success in the film Carmen Jones (1954), Belafonte had his breakthrough album with Calypso (1956), which became the first LP in the world to sell more than one million copies in a year. He stated that it was the first million-selling album ever in England. The album is No. 4 on Billboard's Top 100 Album list for spending 31 weeks at No. 1, 58 weeks in the Top Ten, and 99 weeks on the U.S. chart. The album introduced American audiences to calypso music, which had originated in Trinidad and Tobago in the early 19th century, and Belafonte was dubbed the "King of Calypso", a title he wore with reservation because he had no claims to any Calypso Monarch titles.

One of the songs included in the album is "Banana Boat Song", listed as "Day-O" on the Calypso LP, which reached No. 5 on the pop chart and featured its signature lyric "Day-O".

Many of the compositions recorded for Calypso, including "Banana Boat Song" and "Jamaica Farewell", gave songwriting credit to Irving Burgie.

In the United Kingdom, "Banana Boat Song" was released in March 1957 and spent ten weeks in the Top 10 of the UK singles chart, reaching a peak of No. 2, and in August, "Island in the Sun" reached No. 3, spending 14 weeks in the Top 10. In November, "Mary's Boy Child" reached number one in the UK, where it spent seven weeks.

=== Middle career (1959–1970) ===
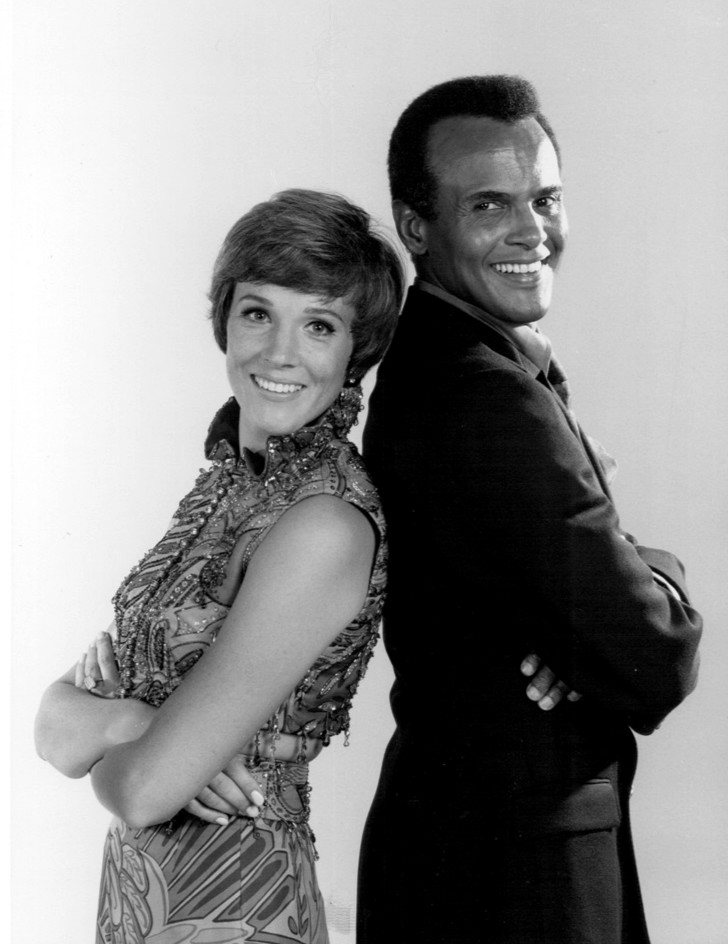
With Julie Andrews on the NBC special An Evening with Julie Andrews and Harry Belafonte (1969)

While primarily known for calypso, Belafonte recorded in many different genres, including blues, folk, gospel, show tunes, and American standards. His second-most popular hit, which came immediately after "The Banana Boat Song", was the comedic tune "Mama Look at Bubu", also known as "Mama Look a Boo-Boo", originally recorded by Lord Melody in 1955, in which he sings humorously about misbehaving and disrespectful children. It reached No. 11 on the pop chart.

In 1959, Belafonte starred in Tonight With Belafonte, a nationally televised special that featured Odetta, who sang "Water Boy" and performed a duet with Belafonte of "There's a Hole in My Bucket" that hit the national charts in 1961. Belafonte was the first Black person to win an Emmy, for Revlon Revue: Tonight with Belafonte (1960). Two live albums, both recorded at Carnegie Hall in 1959 and 1960, enjoyed critical and commercial success. From his 1959 album, "Hava Nagila" became part of his regular routine and one of his signature songs. He was one of many entertainers recruited by Frank Sinatra to perform at the inaugural gala of President John F. Kennedy in 1961, which included Ella Fitzgerald and Mahalia Jackson, among others. Later that year, RCA Victor released another calypso album, Jump Up Calypso, which became another million seller. During the 1960s he introduced several artists to U.S. audiences, most notably South African singer Miriam Makeba and Greek singer Nana Mouskouri. His album Midnight Special (1962) included Bob Dylan as harmonica player.

As the Beatles and other stars from Britain began to dominate the U.S. pop charts, Belafonte's commercial success diminished; 1964's Belafonte at The Greek Theatre was his last album to appear in Billboard's Top 40. His last hit single, "A Strange Song", was released in 1967 and peaked at No. 5 on the adult contemporary music charts. Belafonte received Grammy Awards for the albums Swing Dat Hammer (1960) and An Evening with Belafonte/Makeba (1965), the latter of which dealt with the political plight of black South Africans under apartheid. He earned six Gold Records.

During the 1960s, Belafonte appeared on TV specials alongside artists such as Julie Andrews, Petula Clark, Lena Horne, and Nana Mouskouri. In 1967, Belafonte was the first non-classical artist to perform at the Saratoga Performing Arts Center (SPAC) in Upstate New York, soon to be followed by concerts there by the Doors, the 5th Dimension, the Who, and Janis Joplin.

From February 5 to 9, 1968, Belafonte guest hosted The Tonight Show substituting for Johnny Carson. Among his interview guests were Martin Luther King Jr. and Senator Robert F. Kennedy.

=== Later recordings and subsequent activities (1971–2017) ===
Belafonte's fifth and final calypso album, Calypso Carnival, was issued by RCA in 1971. His recording activity slowed after releasing his final album for RCA in 1974. From the mid-1970s to early 1980s, Belafonte spent most of his time on tour, which included concerts in Japan, Europe, and Cuba. In 1977, Columbia Records released the album Turn the World Around, with a strong focus on world music.

In 1978, he appeared as a guest star on an episode of The Muppet Show, during which he performed his signature song "Day-O". However, the episode is best known for Belafonte's rendition of the spiritual song "Turn the World Around" from the album, which he performed with specially made Muppets that resembled African tribal masks. It became one of the series' most famous performances and was reportedly Jim Henson's favorite episode. After Henson's death in May 1990, Belafonte was asked to perform the song at Henson's memorial service. "Turn the World Around" was also included in the 2005 official hymnal supplement of the Unitarian Universalist Association, Singing the Journey.

From 1979 to 1989, Belafonte served on the Royal Winnipeg Ballet's board of directors.

In 1984, Band Aid, a group of British and Irish artists, released "Do They Know It's Christmas?" as a charity effort. In December of that year, Belafonte created a similar and very successful American benefit single for African famine relief. With fundraiser Ken Kragen, he enlisted Lionel Richie, Kenny Rogers, Stevie Wonder, Quincy Jones and Michael Jackson. The song they produced and recorded, "We Are the World", brought together some of the era's best-known American musicians and is the eighth-best-selling single of all time, with physical sales in excess of 20 million copies. In 1986 the American Music Awards named "We Are the World" Song of the Year and honored Belafonte with the Award of Appreciation.

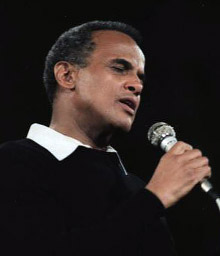
Belafonte performing in 1983

Belafonte released his first album of original material in more than a decade, Paradise in Gazankulu, in 1988, which contained ten protest songs against the South African Apartheid policy, and was his last studio album. In the same year Belafonte, as UNICEF Goodwill Ambassador, attended a symposium in Harare, Zimbabwe, to focus attention on child survival and development in Southern African countries. As part of the symposium, he performed a concert for UNICEF. A Kodak video crew filmed the concert, which was released as a 60-minute concert video titled Global Carnival.

Following a lengthy recording hiatus, An Evening with Harry Belafonte and Friends, a soundtrack and video of a televised concert, were released in 1997 by Island Records. The Long Road to Freedom: An Anthology of Black Music, a multi-artist project recorded by RCA during the 1960s and 1970s, was finally released by the label in 2001. Belafonte went on the Today Show to promote the album on September 11, 2001, and was interviewed by Katie Couric just minutes before the first plane hit the World Trade Center. The album was nominated for the 2002 Grammy Awards for Best Boxed Recording Package, for Best Album Notes, and for Best Historical Album.

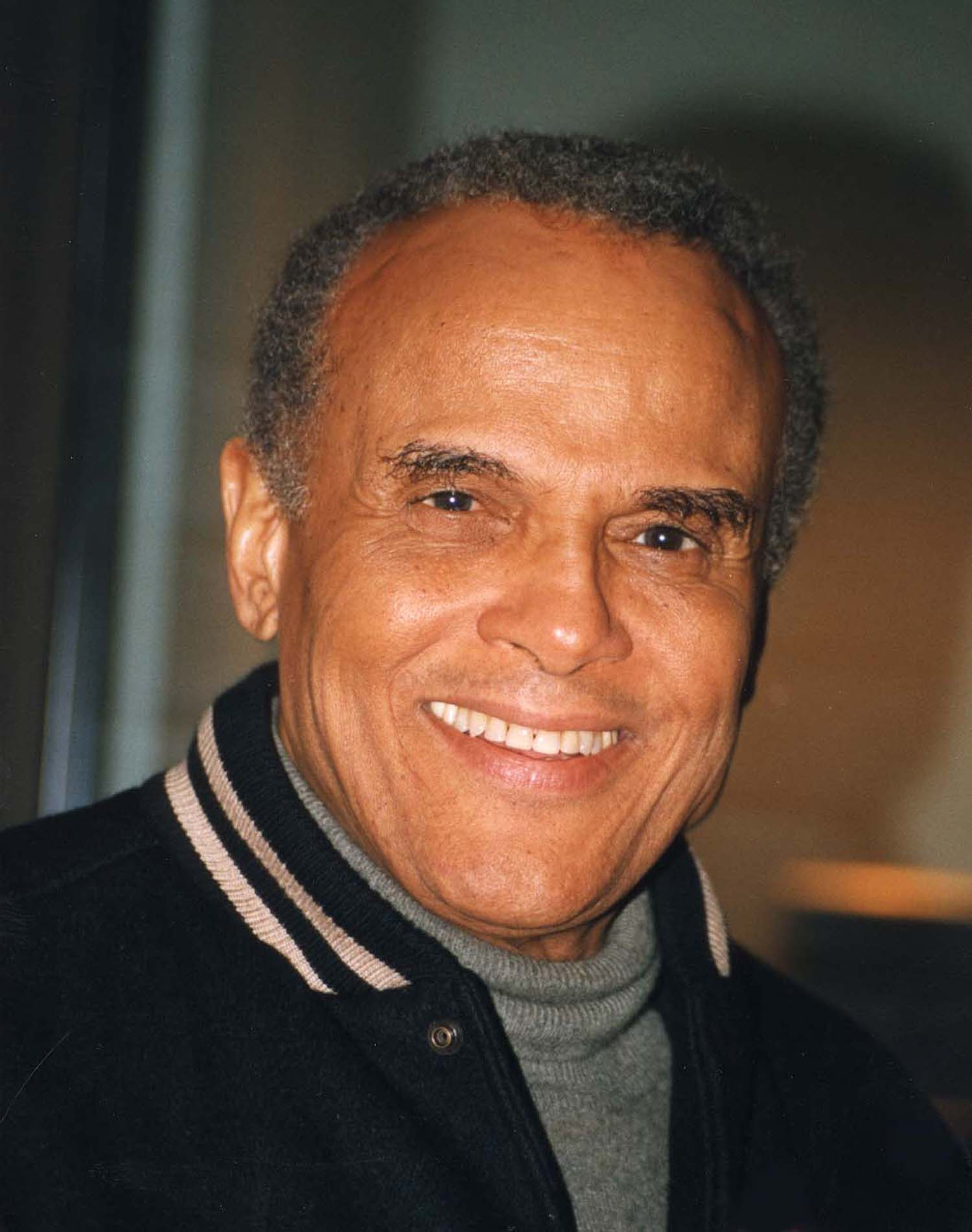
Belafonte in 1996

Belafonte received the Kennedy Center Honors in 1989. He was awarded the National Medal of Arts in 1994, and he won a Grammy Lifetime Achievement Award in 2000. He performed sold-out concerts globally from the 1950s to the 2000s. His last concert was a benefit show for the Atlanta Opera on October 25, 2003. In a 2007 interview, he stated that he had since retired from performing.

On January 29, 2013, Belafonte was the keynote speaker and honoree for the MLK Celebration Series at the Rhode Island School of Design. Belafonte used his career and experiences with King to speak on the role of artists as activists.

Belafonte was inducted as an honorary member of Phi Beta Sigma fraternity on January 11, 2014.

In March 2014, Belafonte was awarded an honorary doctorate from Berklee College of Music in Boston.

In 2017, Belafonte released When Colors Come Together, an anthology of some of his earlier recordings, produced by his son David, who wrote lyrics for an updated version of "Island in the Sun", arranged by longtime Belafonte musical director Richard Cummings, and featuring Belafonte's grandchildren Sarafina and Amadeus and a children's choir.

== Film career ==
=== Early film career (1953–1956) ===
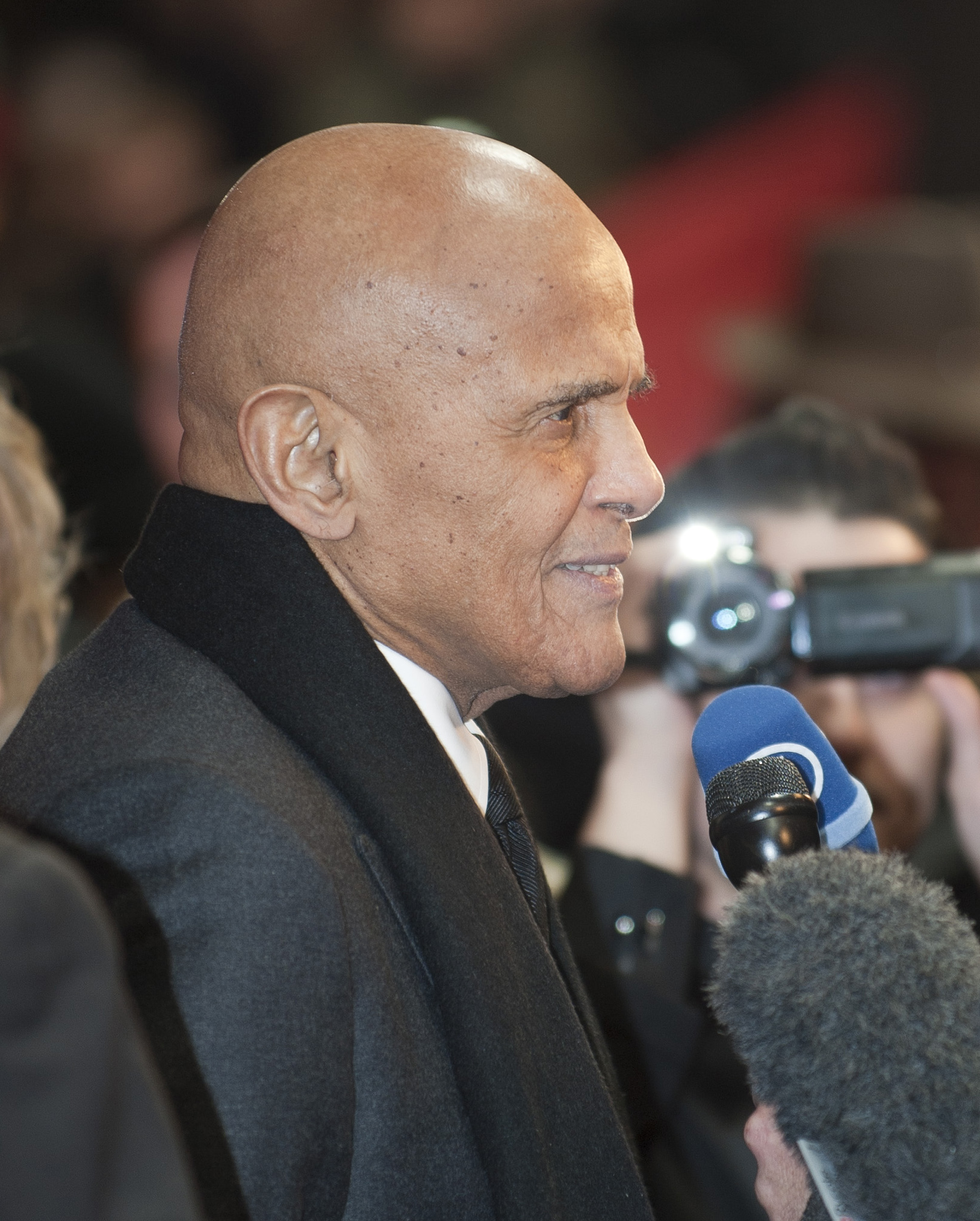
Belafonte at the 2011 Berlin Film Festival

Belafonte starred in numerous films. His first film role was in Bright Road (1953), in which he supported female lead Dorothy Dandridge. The two subsequently starred in Otto Preminger's hit musical Carmen Jones (1954). Ironically, Belafonte's singing in the film was dubbed by an opera singer, as was Dandridge's, both voices being deemed unsuitable for their roles.

=== Rise as an actor (1957–1959) ===
Realizing his own star power, Belafonte was subsequently able to land several (then) controversial film roles. In Island in the Sun (1957), there are hints of an affair between Belafonte's character and the character played by Joan Fontaine; the film also starred James Mason, Dandridge, Joan Collins, Michael Rennie, and John Justin. In 1959, Belafonte starred in and produced (through his company HarBel Productions) Robert Wise's Odds Against Tomorrow, in which Belafonte plays a bank robber uncomfortably teamed with a racist partner (Robert Ryan). Belafonte also co-starred with Inger Stevens in The World, the Flesh and the Devil. Belafonte was offered the role of Porgy in Preminger's Porgy and Bess, where he would have once again starred opposite Dandridge, but refused the role because he objected to its racial stereotyping; Sidney Poitier played the role instead.

=== Later film and theatre involvement (1972–2018) ===
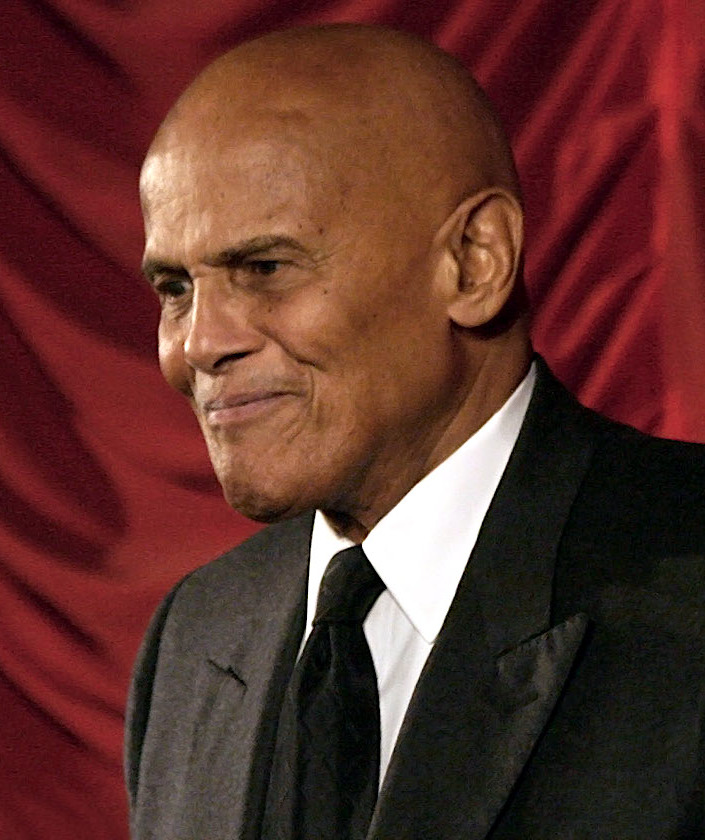
Belafonte at the 2011 Viennale

Dissatisfied with most of the film roles offered to him during the 1960s, Belafonte concentrated on music. In the early 1970s, Belafonte appeared in more films, among which are two with Poitier: Buck and the Preacher (1972) and Uptown Saturday Night (1974). In 1984, Belafonte produced and scored the musical film Beat Street, dealing with the rise of hip-hop culture. Together with Arthur Baker, he produced the gold-certified soundtrack of the same name. Four of his songs appeared in the 1988 film Beetlejuice, including "Day-O" and "Jump in the Line (Shake, Senora)".

Belafonte next starred in a major film in the mid-1990s, appearing with John Travolta in the race-reverse drama White Man's Burden (1995); and in Robert Altman's Jazz Age drama Kansas City (1996), the latter of which garnered him the New York Film Critics Circle Award for Best Supporting Actor. He also starred as an Associate Justice of the Supreme Court of the United States in the TV drama Swing Vote (1999). In 2006, Belafonte appeared in Bobby, Emilio Estevez's ensemble drama about the assassination of Robert F. Kennedy; he played Nelson, a friend of an employee of the Ambassador Hotel (Anthony Hopkins).

His final film appearance was in Spike Lee's Academy Award-winning BlacKkKlansman (2018) as an elderly civil rights pioneer.

== Political activism ==
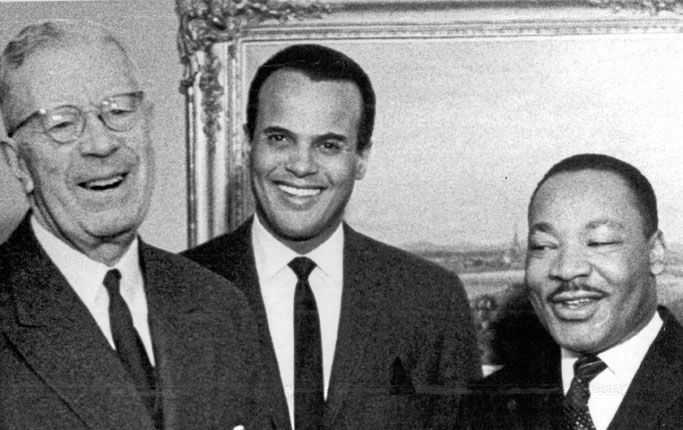
Belafonte with King Gustav VI Adolf and Martin Luther King Jr. in 1966

Belafonte is said to have married politics and pop culture. Belafonte's political beliefs were greatly inspired by the singer, actor, and civil rights activist Paul Robeson, who mentored him. Robeson opposed not only racial prejudice in the United States but also western colonialism in Africa. Belafonte refused to perform in the American South from 1954 until 1961.

Belafonte gave the keynote address at the ACLU of Northern California's annual Bill of Rights Day Celebration in December 2007 and was awarded the Chief Justice Earl Warren Civil Liberties Award. The 2011 Sundance Film Festival featured the documentary film Sing Your Song, a biographical film focusing on Belafonte's contribution to and his leadership in the civil rights movement in America and his endeavors to promote social justice globally. In 2011, Belafonte's memoir My Song was published by Knopf Books.

=== Involvement in the civil rights movement ===
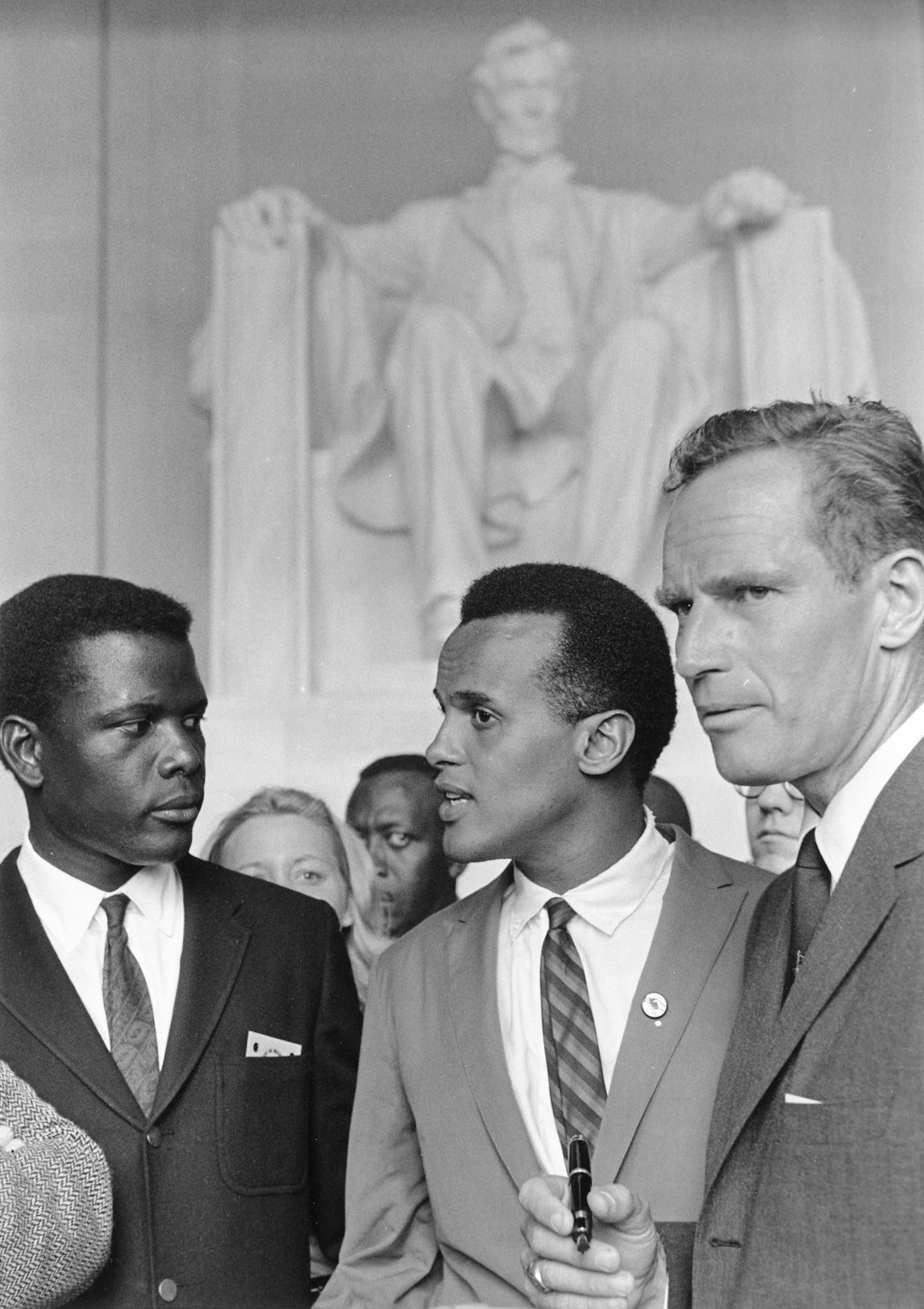
Belafonte (center) at the 1963 Civil Rights March on Washington, D.C., with Sidney Poitier (left) and Charlton Heston

Belafonte supported the civil rights movement in the 1950s and 1960s and was one of Martin Luther King Jr.'s confidants. After King had been arrested for his involvement in the Montgomery bus boycott in 1955, he began traveling to Northern cities to spread awareness and acquire donations for those struggling with social segregation and oppression in the South. The two met at the Abyssinian Baptist Church in Harlem, New York, in March of the following year. This interaction led to years of joint political activism and friendship. Belafonte joined King and his wife, Coretta Scott King, during the 1958 Washington D.C. Youth March for Integrated Schools, and in 1963, he backed King in conversations with Robert F. Kennedy, helping to organize the 1963 March on Washington—the site of King's famous "I Have a Dream" Speech. He provided for King's family since King earned only $8,000 ($80,000 in today's money) a year as a preacher. As with many other civil rights activists, Belafonte was blacklisted during the McCarthy era. During the 1963 Birmingham campaign, Belafonte bailed King out of the Birmingham, Alabama jail and raised $50,000 to release other civil rights protesters. He contributed to the 1961 Freedom Rides, and supported voter registration drives He later recalled, "Paul Robeson had been my first great formative influence; you might say he gave me my backbone. Martin King was the second; he nourished my soul." Throughout his career, Belafonte was an advocate for political and humanitarian causes, such as the Anti-Apartheid Movement and USA for Africa. From 1987 until his death, he was a UNICEF Goodwill Ambassador.

During the Mississippi Freedom Summer of 1964, Belafonte bankrolled the Student Nonviolent Coordinating Committee, flying to Mississippi that August with Sidney Poitier and $60,000 in cash and entertaining crowds in Greenwood. In 1968, Belafonte appeared on a Petula Clark primetime television special on NBC. In the middle of a duet of On the Path of Glory, Clark smiled and briefly touched Belafonte's arm, which prompted complaints from Doyle Lott, the advertising manager of the show's sponsor, Plymouth Motors. Lott wanted to retape the segment, but Clark, who had ownership of the special, told NBC that the performance would be shown intact or she would not allow it to be aired at all. Newspapers reported the controversy, Lott was relieved of his responsibilities, and when the special aired, it attracted high ratings.

Belafonte taped an appearance on an episode of The Smothers Brothers Comedy Hour to be aired on September 29, 1968, performing a controversial Mardi Gras number intercut with footage from the 1968 Democratic National Convention riots. CBS censors deleted the segment. The full unedited content was broadcast in 1993 as part of a complete Smothers Brothers Comedy Hour syndication package.

=== Involvement in the Kennedy campaign ===
In the 1960 election between John F. Kennedy and Richard Nixon, notable Black athlete Jackie Robinson advocated his support for the Nixon campaign. His reasoning for doing so was his perception of Kennedy's championing of the Civil Rights movement as disingenuous. Because of Robinson's social impact on Black Americans, the Democratic Party was determined to find a comparable Black endorser for Kennedy's campaign. Fresh off of his win as the first Black man to receive an Emmy Award for his work on Tonight with Belafonte, Belafonte was Kennedy's pick to fill the endorsement position.

The two met in Belafonte's apartment, where Kennedy had hoped to convince Belafonte to mobilize support for his campaign. He thought to accomplish this by having Belafonte mobilize his influence amongst other Black entertainers of the era, persuading them to rally for Kennedy's presidential nomination. Unexpectedly, Belafonte was not so impressed by the candidate, sharing the same sentiments as Robinson about Kennedy's role (or lack thereof) in maintaining civil rights as an essential part of his campaign. To improve his engagement with Black America, Belafonte suggested to Kennedy that he contact Martin Luther King, making a connection to a viable source of leadership within the movement. Kennedy, though, was hesitant with this suggestion, questioning the social impact the preacher could make on the campaign. After much convincing–as Kennedy and King would later meet in June 1960–the two men negotiated a deal that if Nixon became the nominee for the Republican party, Belafonte would support Kennedy's presidential pursuits. Belafonte's endorsement of the campaign was further substantiated after both Kennedy brothers had worked to bail King out of jail in Atlanta after a sit-in, engaging with a Georgia judge.

Joining the Hollywood for Kennedy committee, Belafonte appeared in a 1960 campaign commercial for Democratic presidential candidate John F. Kennedy. Unfortunately, the commercial was shown on television for only one broadcast. Belafonte also attended and performed at Kennedy's inaugural ball. Kennedy later named Belafonte cultural advisor to the Peace Corps. After Kennedy's assassination, Belafonte supported Lyndon B. Johnson for the 1964 United States presidential election.

=== The Baldwin–Kennedy Meeting ===
Renowned author James Baldwin contacted Belafonte three years after John F. Kennedy's election. The purpose of the call was to invite Belafonte to a meeting to speak with Attorney General Robert Kennedy about the continued plight of the Black people in America. This event was known as the Baldwin-Kennedy Meeting. Belafonte met with fifteen others, including Kennedy and Baldwin, in Kennedy's Central Park South apartment on May 24, 1963.

The other members included were Thais Aubrey, David Baldwin, Edwin Berry, Kenneth Clark, Eddie Fales, Lorraine Hansberry, Lena Horne, Clarence Jones, Burke Marshall, Henry Morgenthau III, June Shagaloff, Jerome Smith, and Rip Torn.

The guests engaged in cordial political and social conversation. Later, the talk led to an investigation of the position of Black people in the Vietnam War. Offended by Kennedy's implication that Black men should serve in the war, Jerome Smith scolded the young Attorney General. Smith, a Black man and Civil Rights advocate had been severely beaten while fighting for the movement's cause, which enforced his strong resistance to Kennedy's assertion, frustrated that he should fight for a country that did not seem to want to fight for him.

A short time after the confrontation, Belafonte spoke with Kennedy. Belafonte then told him that even with the meeting's tension, he needed to be in the presence of a man like Smith to understand Black people's frustration with patriotism that Kennedy and other leaders could not understand.

=== Obama administration ===
In the 1950s, Belafonte was a supporter of the African American Students Foundation, which gave a grant to Barack Obama Sr., the late father of 44th U.S. president Barack Obama, to study at the University of Hawaii in 1959.

In 2011, Belafonte commented on the Obama administration and the role that popular opinion played in shaping its policies. "I think [Obama] plays the game that he plays because he sees no threat from evidencing concerns for the poor."

On December 9, 2012, in an interview with Al Sharpton on MSNBC, Belafonte expressed dismay that many political leaders in the United States continue to oppose Obama's policies even after his reelection: "The only thing left for Barack Obama to do is to work like a third-world dictator and just put all of these guys in jail. You're violating the American desire."

On February 1, 2013, Belafonte received the NAACP's Spingarn Medal, and in the televised ceremony, he counted Constance L. Rice among those previous recipients of the award whom he regarded highly for speaking up "to remedy the ills of the nation."

In November 2014, Belafonte attended "Revolution and Religion," a dialogue between Bob Avakian and Cornel West at Riverside Church in New York City.

=== Support for Bernie Sanders ===
In 2016, Belafonte endorsed Vermont U.S. senator Bernie Sanders in the Democratic primaries, saying: "I think he represents opportunity, I think he represents a moral imperative, I think he represents a certain kind of truth that's not often evidenced in the course of politics."

Belafonte was an honorary co-chairman of the Women's March on Washington, which took place on January 21, 2017, the day after the inauguration of Donald Trump as president.

=== The Sanders Institute ===
Belafonte was a fellow at the Sanders Institute.

== Humanitarian activism ==
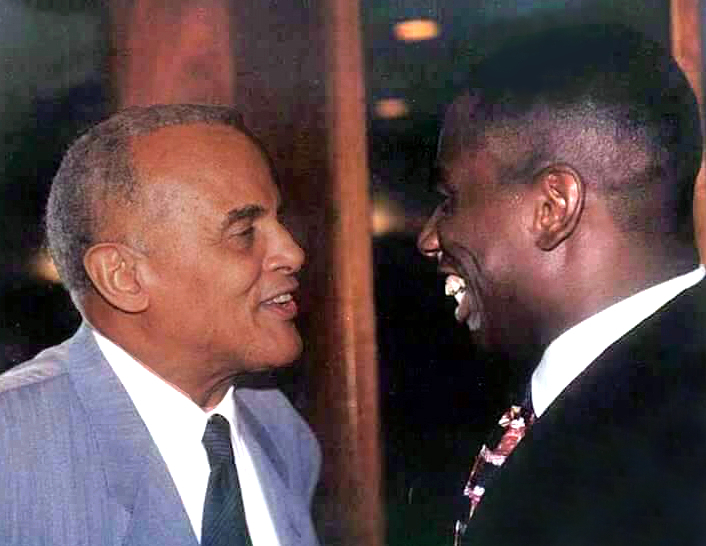
Belafonte (left) with activist and opera star Stacey Robinson in 1988

=== HIV/AIDS crisis ===
In 1985, Belafonte helped organize the Grammy Award-winning song "We Are the World", a multi-artist effort to raise funds for Africa. He performed in the Live Aid concert that same year. In 1987, he received an appointment to UNICEF as a goodwill ambassador. Following his appointment, Belafonte traveled to Dakar, Senegal, where he served as chairman of the International Symposium of Artists and Intellectuals for African Children. He also helped to raise funds—along with more than 20 other artists—in the largest concert ever held in sub-Saharan Africa. In 1994, he embarked on a mission to Rwanda and launched a media campaign to raise awareness of the needs of Rwandan children.

In 2001, Belafonte visited South Africa to support the campaign against HIV/AIDS. In 2002, Africare awarded him the Bishop John T. Walker Distinguished Humanitarian Service Award for his efforts. In 2004, Belafonte traveled to Kenya to stress the importance of educating children in the region.

=== Prostate Cancer awareness ===
Belafonte had been involved in prostate cancer advocacy since 1996, when he was diagnosed and successfully treated for the disease. On June 27, 2006, Belafonte received the BET Humanitarian Award at the 2006 BET Awards. He was named one of nine 2006 Impact Award recipients by AARP: The Magazine.

=== Work with UNICEF ===
On October 19, 2007, Belafonte represented UNICEF on Norwegian television to support the annual telethon (TV Aksjonen) and helped raise a world record of $10 per Norwegian citizen.

=== Various Activist work ===
Belafonte was also an ambassador for the Bahamas. He sat on the board of directors of the Advancement Project. He also served on the advisory council of the Nuclear Age Peace Foundation.

=== New York City Pride Parade ===
In 2013, Belafonte was named a grand marshal of the New York City Pride Parade alongside Edie Windsor and Earl Fowlkes.

== Belafonte and foreign policy ==
Belafonte was a longtime critic of U.S. foreign policy. He started making political statements on the subject in the early 1980s. At various times, he made statements opposing the unilateral U.S. embargo on Cuba; praising Soviet peace initiatives; criticising the U.S. invasion of Grenada that was in violation of international law; praising the Abraham Lincoln Brigade; honoring Ethel and Julius Rosenberg; and praising Fidel Castro. Belafonte is also known for his visit to Cuba that helped ensure hip-hop's place in Cuban society. According to Geoffrey Baker's article "Hip hop, Revolucion! Nationalizing Rap in Cuba", in 1999, Belafonte met with representatives of the rap community immediately before meeting with Castro. This meeting resulted in Castro's personal approval of, and hence the government's involvement in, the incorporation of rap into his country's culture. In a 2003 interview, Belafonte reflected upon this meeting's influence:

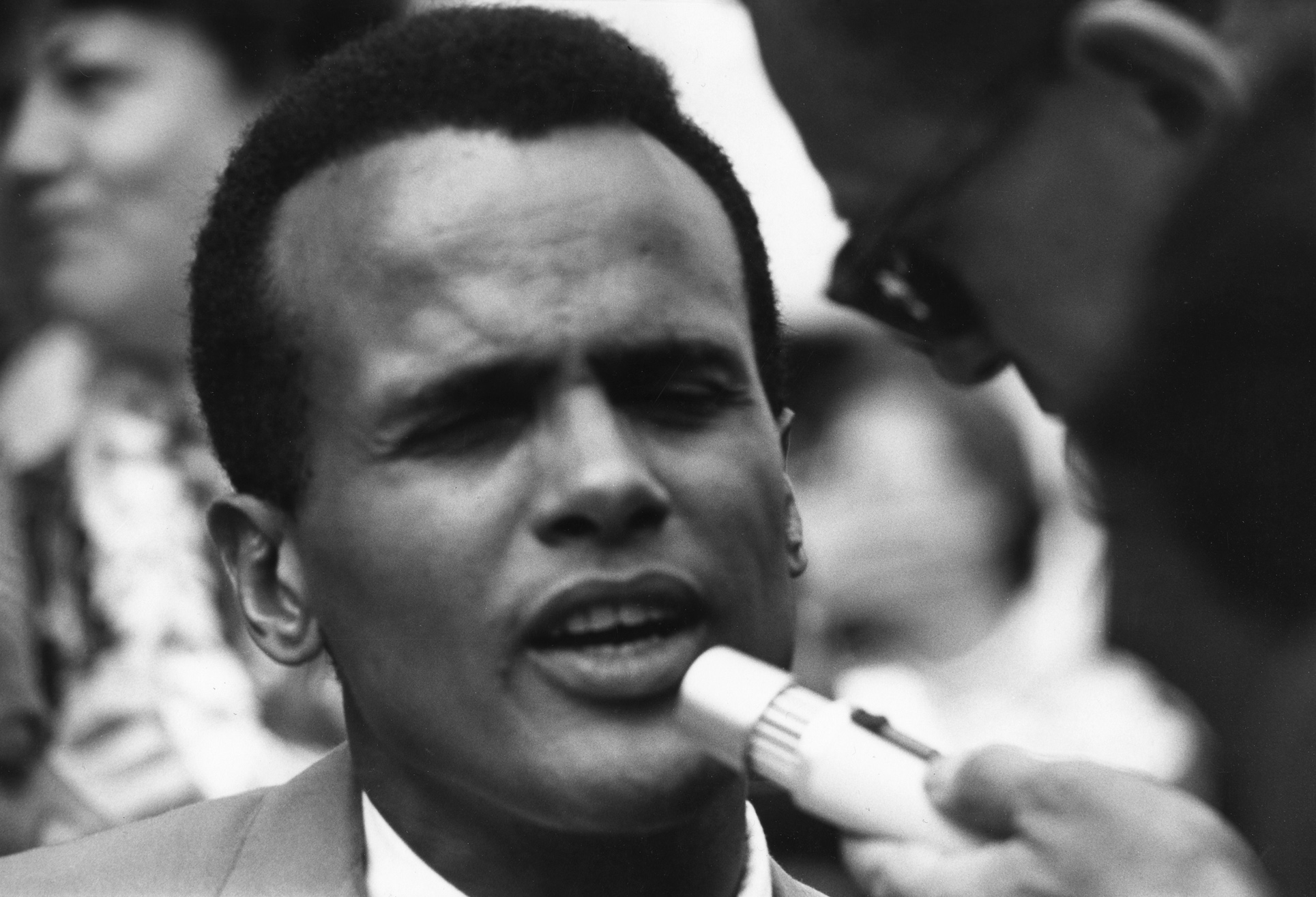
Belafonte speaking at the 1963 March on Washington for Jobs and Freedom

"When I went back to Havana a couple years later, the people in the hip-hop community came to see me and we hung out for a bit. They thanked me profusely and I said, 'Why?' and they said, 'Because your little conversation with Fidel and the Minister of Culture on hip-hop led to there being a special division within the ministry and we've got our own studio.'."

Belafonte was active in the Anti-Apartheid Movement. In 1987, he was the master of ceremonies at a reception honoring African National Congress President Oliver Tambo at Roosevelt House, Hunter College, in New York City. The reception was held by the American Committee on Africa (ACOA) and The Africa Fund. He was a board member of the TransAfrica Forum and the Institute for Policy Studies.

=== Opposition to the George W. Bush administration ===
Belafonte achieved widespread attention for his political views in 2002 when he began making a series of comments about President George W. Bush, his administration and the Iraq War. During an interview with Ted Leitner for San Diego's 760 KFMB, on October 10, 2002, Belafonte referred to Malcolm X. Belafonte said:

There is an old saying, in the days of slavery. There were those slaves who lived on the plantation, and there were those slaves who lived in the house. You got the privilege of living in the house if you served the master, do exactly the way the master intended to have you serve him. That gave you privilege. Colin Powell is permitted to come into the house of the master, as long as he would serve the master, according to the master's dictates. And when Colin Powell dares to suggest something other than what the master wants to hear, he will be turned back out to pasture. And you don't hear much from those who live in the pasture.

Belafonte used the quotation to characterize former United States Secretaries of State Colin Powell and Condoleezza Rice. Powell and Rice both responded, with Powell calling the remarks "unfortunate" and Rice saying: "I don't need Harry Belafonte to tell me what it means to be black."

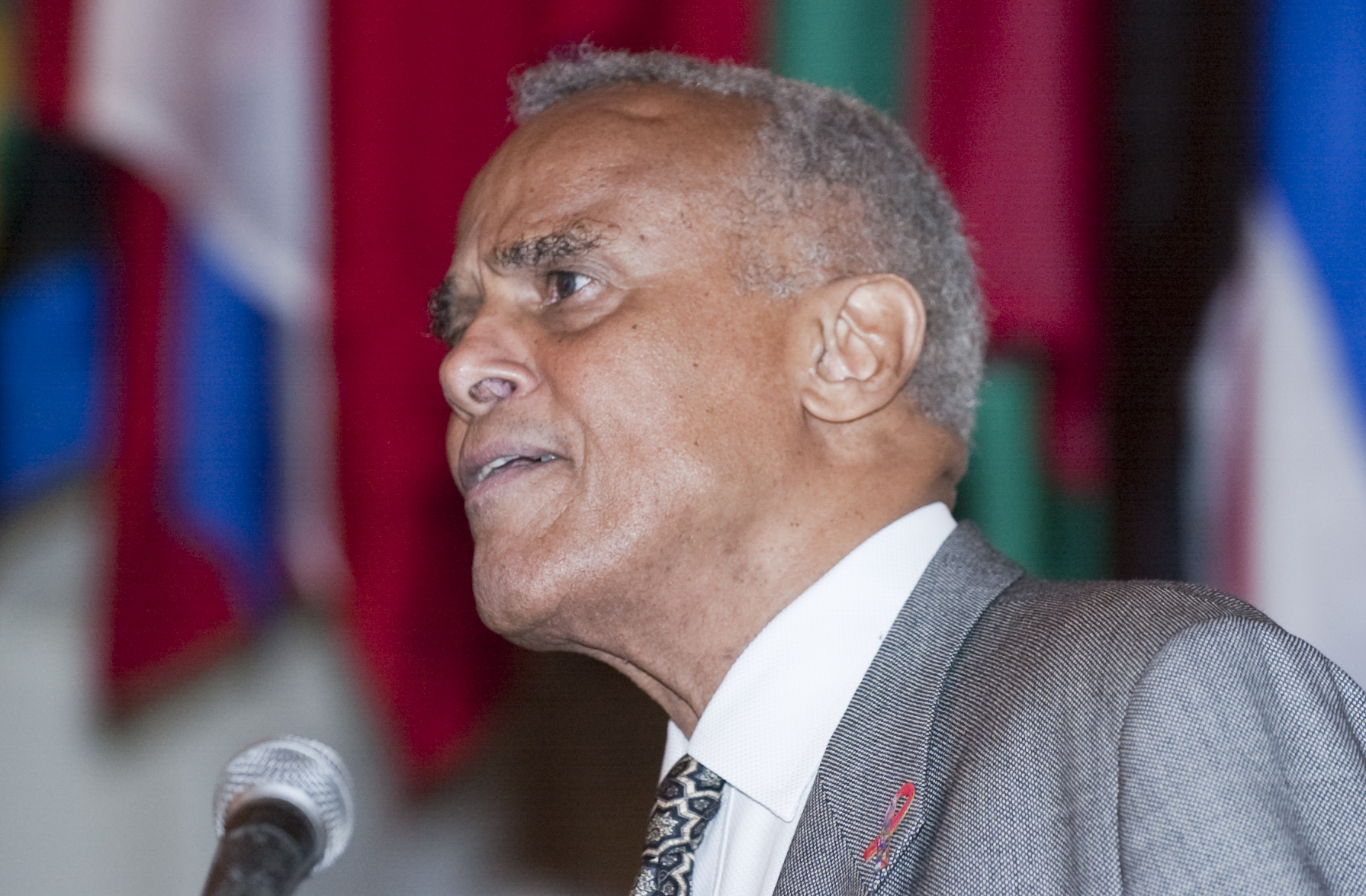
Belafonte in 2003

The comment resurfaced in an interview with Amy Goodman for Democracy Now! in 2006. In January 2006, Belafonte led a delegation of activists including actor Danny Glover and activist/professor Cornel West to meet with Venezuelan president Hugo Chávez. In 2005, Chávez, an outspoken Bush critic, initiated a program to provide cheaper heating oil for poor people in several areas of the United States. Belafonte supported this initiative. He was quoted as saying, during the meeting with Chávez: "No matter what the greatest tyrant in the world, the greatest terrorist in the world, George W. Bush says, we're here to tell you: Not hundreds, not thousands, but millions of the American people support your revolution." Belafonte and Glover met again with Chávez in 2006. The comment ignited a great deal of controversy. Hillary Clinton refused to acknowledge Belafonte's presence at an awards ceremony that featured both of them. AARP, which had just named him one of its 10 Impact Award honorees 2006, released this statement following the remarks: "AARP does not condone the manner and tone which he has chosen and finds his comments completely unacceptable."

During a Martin Luther King Jr. Day speech at Duke University in 2006, Belafonte compared the American government to the hijackers of the September 11 attacks, saying: "What is the difference between that terrorist and other terrorists?" In response to criticism about his remarks, Belafonte asked: "What do you call Bush when the war he put us in to date has killed almost as many Americans as died on 9/11 and the number of Americans wounded in war is almost triple? ... By most definitions Bush can be considered a terrorist." When he was asked about his expectation of criticism for his remarks on the war in Iraq, Belafonte responded: "Bring it on. Dissent is central to any democracy."

In another interview, Belafonte remarked that while his comments may have been "hasty", he felt that the Bush administration suffered from "arrogance wedded to ignorance" and its policies around the world were "morally bankrupt." In a January 2006 speech to the annual meeting of the Arts Presenters Members Conference, Belafonte referred to "the new Gestapo of Homeland Security", saying: "You can be arrested and have no right to counsel!" During a Martin Luther King Jr. Day speech at Duke University in Durham, North Carolina in January 2006, Belafonte said that if he could choose his epitaph, it would read "Harry Belafonte, Patriot."

In 2004, he was awarded the Domestic Human Rights Award in San Francisco by Global Exchange.

== Business career ==
Belafonte liked and often visited the Caribbean island of Bonaire. He and Maurice Neme of Oranjestad, Aruba, formed a joint venture to create a luxurious private community on Bonaire named Belnem, a portmanteau of the two men's names. Construction began on June 3, 1966. The neighborhood is managed by the Bel-Nem Caribbean Development Corporation. Belafonte and Neme served as its first directors. In 2017, Belnem was home to 717 people.

== Personal life, health and death ==
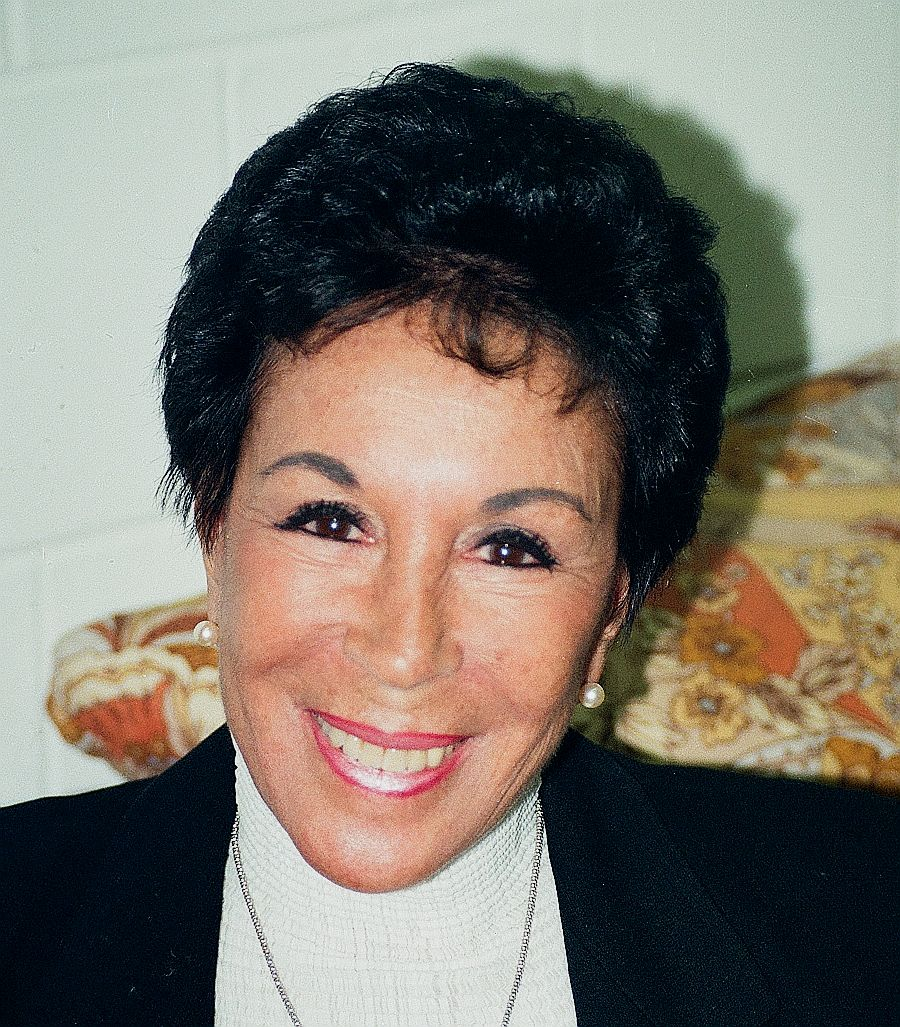
Second wife Julie Robinson in 1998

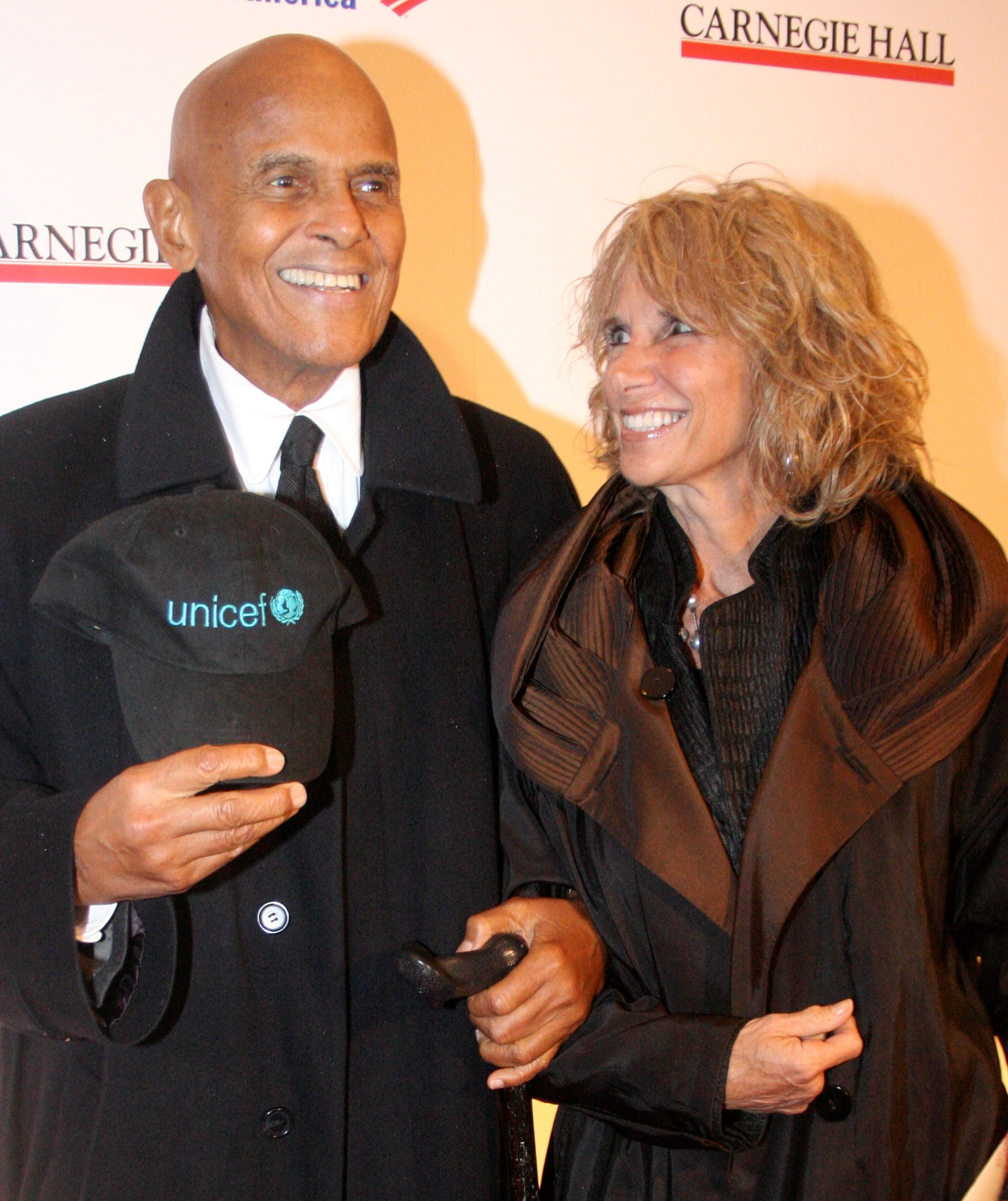
Belafonte with third wife Pamela Frank in April 2011

Belafonte and Marguerite Byrd were married from 1948 to 1957. They had two daughters: Adrienne and Shari. They separated when Byrd was pregnant with Shari. Belafonte had an affair with actress Joan Collins during the filming of Island in the Sun. Adrienne and her daughter Rachel Blue founded the Anir Foundation/Experience, focused on humanitarian work in southern Africa.

On March 8, 1957, Belafonte married his second wife Julie Robinson (1928–2024), a dancer with the Katherine Dunham Company who was of Jewish descent. They had two children: Gina and David. After 47 years of marriage, Belafonte and Robinson divorced in 2004. In April 2008, he married Pamela Frank, a photographer.

In 1953, Belafonte was financially able to move from Washington Heights, Manhattan, "into a white neighborhood in East Elmhurst, Queens." In fall 1958, Belafonte was looking for an apartment to rent on the Upper West Side. After he had been turned away from other apartment buildings due to being black, he had his white publicist rent an apartment at 300 West End Avenue for him. When he moved in and the owner realized that he was an African American, he was asked to leave. Belafonte not only refused, but he also used three dummy real estate companies to buy the building and converted it into a co-op, inviting his friends, both white and black, to buy apartments. He lived in the 21-room, 6-bedroom apartment for 48 years.

Belafonte had five grandchildren: Rachel and Brian through his children with Marguerite Byrd, and Maria, Sarafina and Amadeus through his children with Robinson. He had two great-grandchildren by his oldest grandson Brian. In October 1998, Belafonte contributed a letter to Liv Ullmann's book Letter to My Grandchild.

In 1996, Belafonte was diagnosed with prostate cancer and was treated for the disease. He suffered a stroke in 2004, which took away his inner-ear balance. From 2019, Belafonte's health began to decline, but he remained an active and prominent figure in the civil rights movement.

Belafonte died from congestive heart failure at his home on the Upper West Side on April 25, 2023, at the age of 96.

== Discography ==
Belafonte released 27 studio albums, 8 live albums, and 6 collaborations, and achieved critical and commercial success.

== Filmography ==
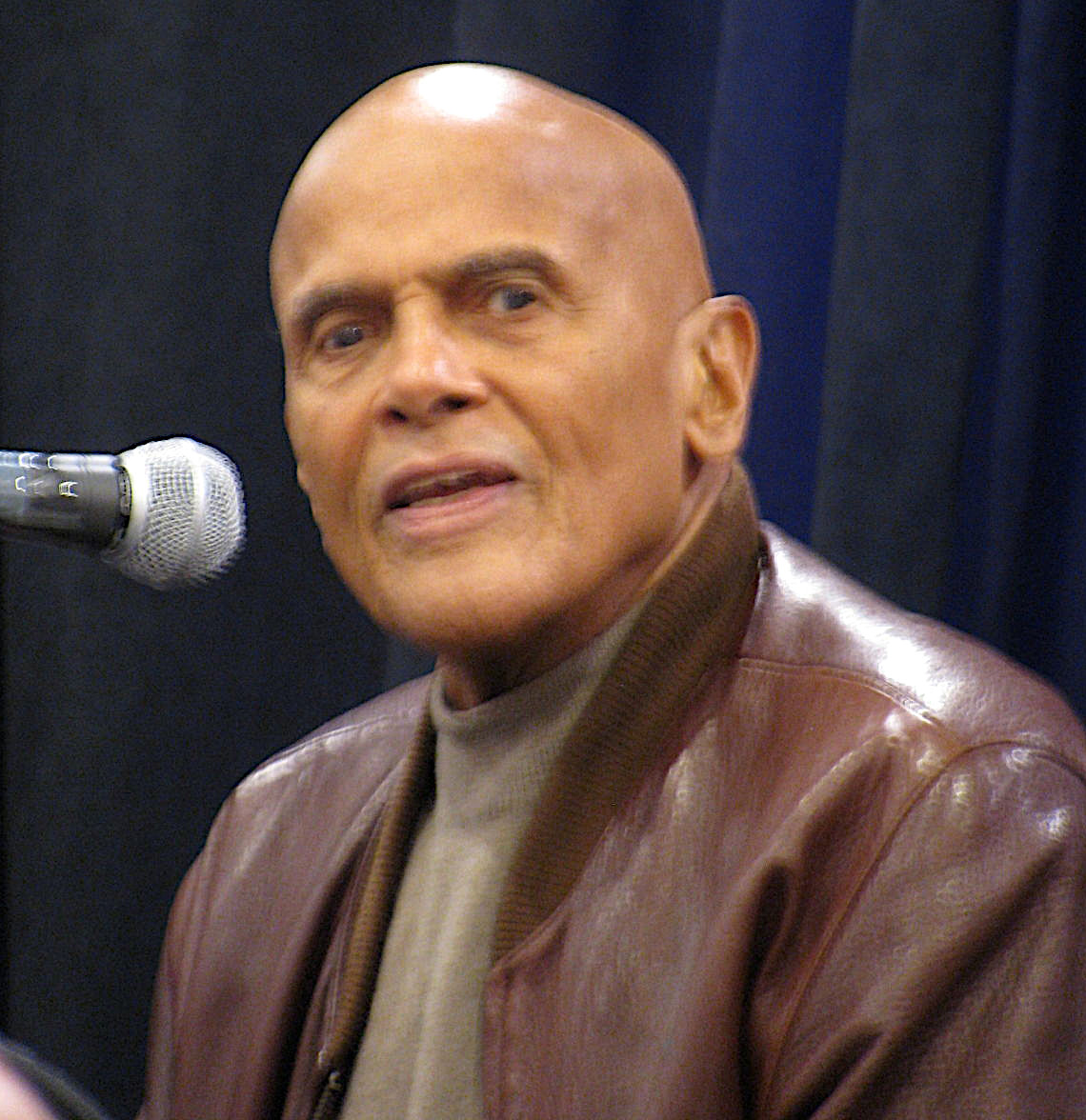
Belafonte in 2013

=== Film ===
Year	Title	Role	Notes	Ref
1953	Bright Road	Mr. Williams		
1954	Carmen Jones	Joe		
1957	Island in the Sun	David Boyeur		
1957	The Heart of Show Business		Short	
1959	The World, the Flesh and the Devil	Ralph Burton		
1959	Odds Against Tomorrow	Johnny Ingram		
1970	The Angel Levine	Alexander Levine		
1972	Buck and the Preacher	Preacher		
1974	Uptown Saturday Night	Dan "Geechie Dan" Beauford		
1983	Drei Lieder		Short	
1992	The Player	Cameo		
1994	Ready to Wear	Cameo		
1995	White Man's Burden	Thaddeus Thomas		
1996	Kansas City	Seldom Seen		
2006	Bobby	Nelson		
2018	BlacKkKlansman	Jerome Turner	Final film appearance	

Documentary

Year	Title	Ref
1970	King: A Filmed Record... Montgomery to Memphis	
1981	Fundi: The Story of Ella Baker	
1982	A veces miro mi vida	
1983	Sag nein	
1984	Der Schönste Traum	
1989	We Shall Overcome	
1995	Hank Aaron: Chasing the Dream	
1996	Jazz '34	
1998	Scandalize My Name: Stories from the Blacklist	
2001	Fidel	
2003	XXI Century	
2003	Conakry Kas	
2004	Ladders	
2010	Motherland	
2011	Sing Your Song	
2013	Hava Nagila: The Movie	
2020	The Sit-In: Harry Belafonte hosts the Tonight Show	

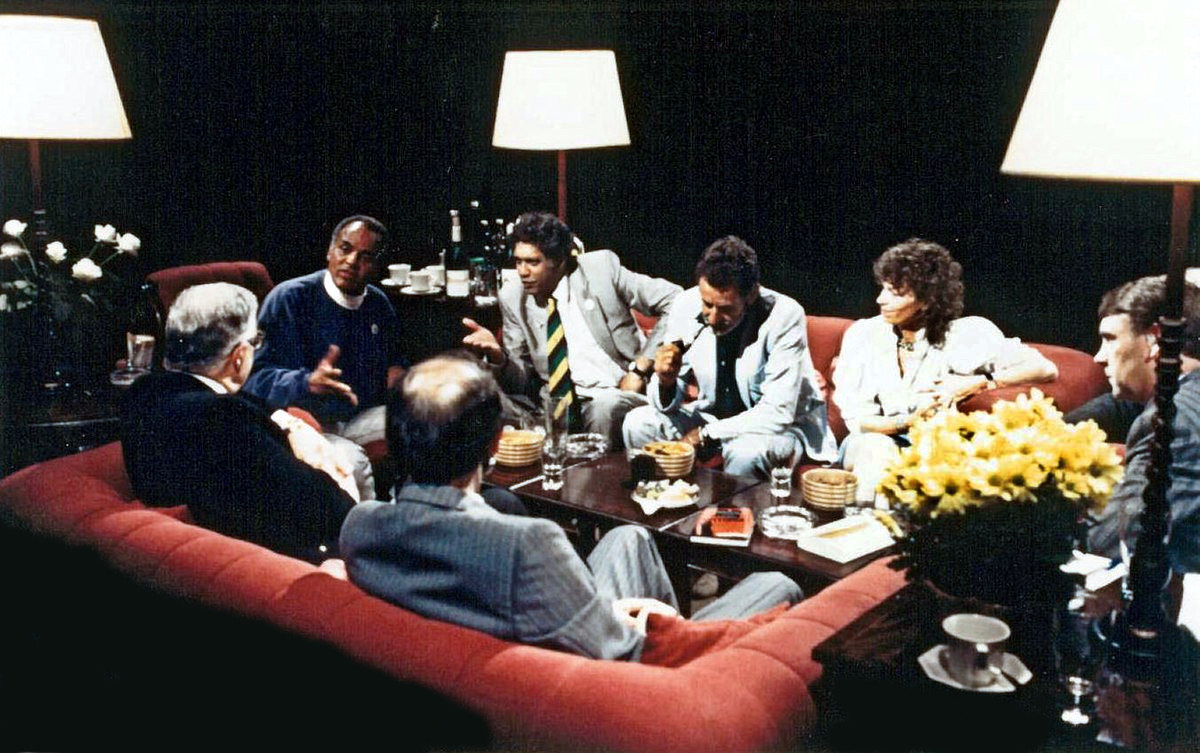
Appearing (second from left) on the British television discussion programme After Dark, in 1988

=== Television ===
- Sugar Hill Times (1949–1950)
- The Ed Sullivan Show (1953–1964)
- The Nat King Cole Show (1957)
- The Steve Allen Show (1958)
- Tonight With Belafonte (1959)
- Round Table on March on Washington (1963)
- The Danny Kaye Show (1965)
- Petula (1968)
- The Smothers Brothers Comedy Hour (1968)
- The Tonight Show (1968)
- A World in Music (1969)
- Harry & Lena, For The Love Of Life (1969)
- A World in Love (1970)
- The Flip Wilson Show (1973)
- Free to Be ... You and Me (1974)
- The Muppet Show (1978)
- Grambling's White Tiger (1981)
- Don't Stop The Carnival (1985)
- After Dark (1988) (extended appearance on political discussion programme, more here)
- An Evening with Harry Belafonte and Friends (1997)
- Swing Vote (1999 TV movie)
- PB&J Otter "The Ice Moose" (1999)
- Tanner on Tanner (2004)
- That's What I'm Talking About (2006) (miniseries)
- When the Levees Broke: A Requiem in Four Acts (2006) (miniseries)
- Speakeasy, interviewing Carlos Santana (2015)

=== Concert videos ===
- En Gränslös Kväll På Operan (1966)
- Don't Stop The Carnival (1985)
- Global Carnival (1988)
- An Evening with Harry Belafonte and Friends (1997)

== Theatre ==
- John Murray Anderson's Almanac (1953)
- 3 for Tonight (1955)
- Moonbirds (1959) [producer]
- Belafonte at the Palace (1959)
- Asinamali! (1987) [producer]

== Accolades and legacy ==
Belafonte is an EGOT honoree, having received three Grammy Awards, an Emmy Award, a Tony Award, and, in 2014, the Jean Hersholt Humanitarian Award at the Academy of Motion Picture Arts and Sciences' 6th Annual Governors Awards. In 2018, the Jamaican government awarded Belafonte with the Order of Merit for outstanding contributions in the field of music.

Belafonte won an Emmy in 1960 for his performance on Revlon Revue. He was nominated four other times.

Theater Awards
Year	Award	Theatrical Production	Category
1954	Tony Award	John Murray Anderson's Almanac	Distinguished Supporting or Featured Musical Actor
1954	Theatre World Awards	John Murray Anderson's Almanac	Award Winner
1954	Donaldson Award	John Murray Anderson's Almanac	Best Actor Debut in a Musical

He also received various honours including the Kennedy Center Honors in 1989, the National Medal of Arts in 1994 and was inducted into the Rock and Roll Hall of Fame in the Early Influence category in 2022.

Belafonte celebrated his 93rd birthday on March 1, 2020, at Harlem's Apollo Theater in a tribute event that concluded "with a thunderous audience singalong" with rapper Doug E. Fresh to 1956's "Banana Boat Song". Soon after, the New York Public Library's Schomburg Center for Research in Black Culture announced it had acquired Belafonte's vast personal archive of "photographs, recordings, films, letters, artwork, clipping albums," and other content.

Belafonte was portrayed by John Legend in the film The Road Home.

== See also ==
- The Belafonte Folk Singers
- List of peace activists
- List of people from Harlem
