= Gina Belafonte =

American actress and producer

- Born: September 8, 1961 (age 65); New York City, New York, US
- Occupations: Actress; producer; activist
- Father: Harry Belafonte

Gina Belafonte (born New York City, September 8, 1961) is an American actress, film and stage producer, and civil rights activist. She is the co-founder of the social non-profit organisation, The Gathering for Justice, and CEO of the social just nonprofit, Sankofa. Belafonte is the daughter of actor Harry Belafonte, and dancer and actress Julie Belafonte, and the half-sister of actress, Shari Belafonte.

== Early life ==
Belafonte was born on September 8, 1961, at Mount Sinai Hospital in New York City, New York, to actor Harry Belafonte and his then-wife Julie Robinson Belafonte. As a young child, she visited Africa as well as the West Indies. At age five, Gina Belafonte attended the Ethical Culture School in New York City alongside her brother David.

== Career ==
she has appeared in such films as Bright Lights, Big City, Tokyo Pop (both 1988), and BlacKkKlansman (2018).

Belafonte served as a producer on Sing Your Song, a 2011 documentary film about her father. She co-founded The Gathering for Justice, a nonprofit organization whose aim is to end child incarceration and eliminate the racial disparities in the criminal justice system, and is the CEO of Sankofa.org, a nonprofit Social Justice, impact production company, founded by her father.

== Partial filmography ==
=== Film ===
Year	Film	Role	Notes	Ref(s)
1984	Beat Street	Elizabeth		
1988	Bright Lights, Big City	Kathy		
1988	Tokyo Pop	Holly		
1989	Drawing the Line: A Portrait of Keith Haring	Narrator	Short documentary film	
1996	Kansas City	Hey-Hey Club Hostess		
1998	Operation Splitsville	Bernice		
2011	Sing Your Song	Self	Documentary film; also producer	
2016	Courting Des Moines	Senator Gina Piccollo		
2018	BlacKkKlansman	Gina B.		
2024	The Lost Holliday	Meredith Clayton-Perrineau		

=== Television ===
Year	Film	Role	Notes
1987	All My Children	Polly	1 episode
1991–1993	The Commish	Carmela Pagan	33 episodes
1997	Duckman	Wanda	Voice role; episode: "Aged Heat 2: Women in Heat"
1997	Johnny Bravo	Newscaster / Computer	Voice roles; episode: "Hip Hop Flop/Talk to Me, Baby/Blanky Hanky Panky"
