= Drawing the Line: A Portrait of Keith Haring =

1989 short documentary film

- DVD cover
- Directed by: Elisabeth Aubert
- Starring: Keith Haring
- Narrated by: Gina Belafonte
- Music by: Michele Amar; Laurent de Wilde
- Country of origin: United States
- Original language: English

Production
- Producer: Elisabeth Aubert
- Editors: Alan Cohn; Judith Starr Wolff
- Running time: 29 minutes

Original release
- Network: PBS
- Release: November 1, 1989

Drawing the Line: A Portrait of Keith Haring is a 1989 American short documentary film about artist Keith Haring. Produced and directed by Elisabeth Aubert, and narrated by Gina Belafonte, the film highlights Haring's emergence from the New York City graffiti subculture of the 1980s, the mass marketing of his work and the opening of the Pop Shop, and the social commentary present in his paintings and drawings.

== Synopsis ==
Drawing the Line: A Portrait of Keith Haring chronicles Haring's life and career, growing up in Reading, Pennsylvania, in the 1960s and becoming involved in the graffiti subculture of New York City in the 1980s. Among the aspects of his career and work mentioned are his chalk drawings he created on the New York City Subway; his professional relationship with Andy Warhol, through whom he became involved in creating artwork for an ad campaign for Absolut Vodka; the opening of Haring's Pop Shop in New York City, which sold shirts, posters, and other items featuring his work; his sculptures, including a sculpture he created for Schneider Children's Hospital in New Hyde Park, New York; his Crack Is Wack and Berlin Wall murals; and his banner CityKids Speak on Liberty, made to commemorate the anniversary of the Statue of Liberty's arrival in the United States.

The film features interviews with Haring, as well as art dealers and gallery owners Tony Shafrazi, Leo Castelli, and Jeffrey Deitch; Whitney Museum curator Barbara Haskell; and actor Dennis Hopper.

== Release ==
Drawing the Line: A Portrait of Keith Haring debuted on television, airing on PBS member stations on November 1, 1989. Haring died from AIDS-related complications on February 16, 1990; on December 1, 1991, the Mint Museum in Charlotte, North Carolina, screened the film in honor of World AIDS Day.

== Home media ==
The film was released on VHS by Kultur International Films in the early 1990s; Kultur re-released the film on DVD in 2004. The DVD release of the film contains a postscript preceding the end credits that notes the date of Haring's death.
