= Baldwin–Kennedy meeting =

1963 attempt to improve US race relations

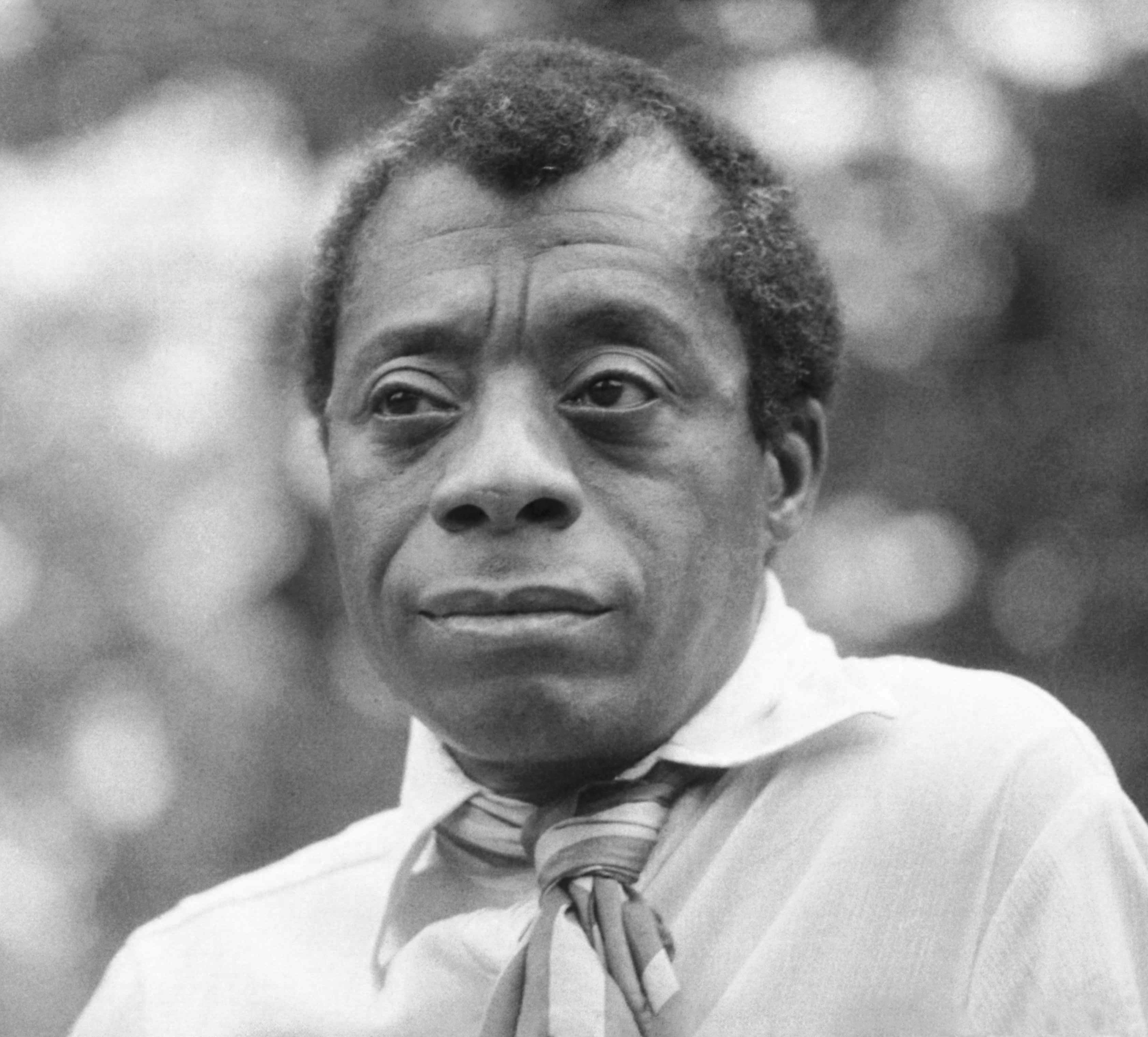
Baldwin

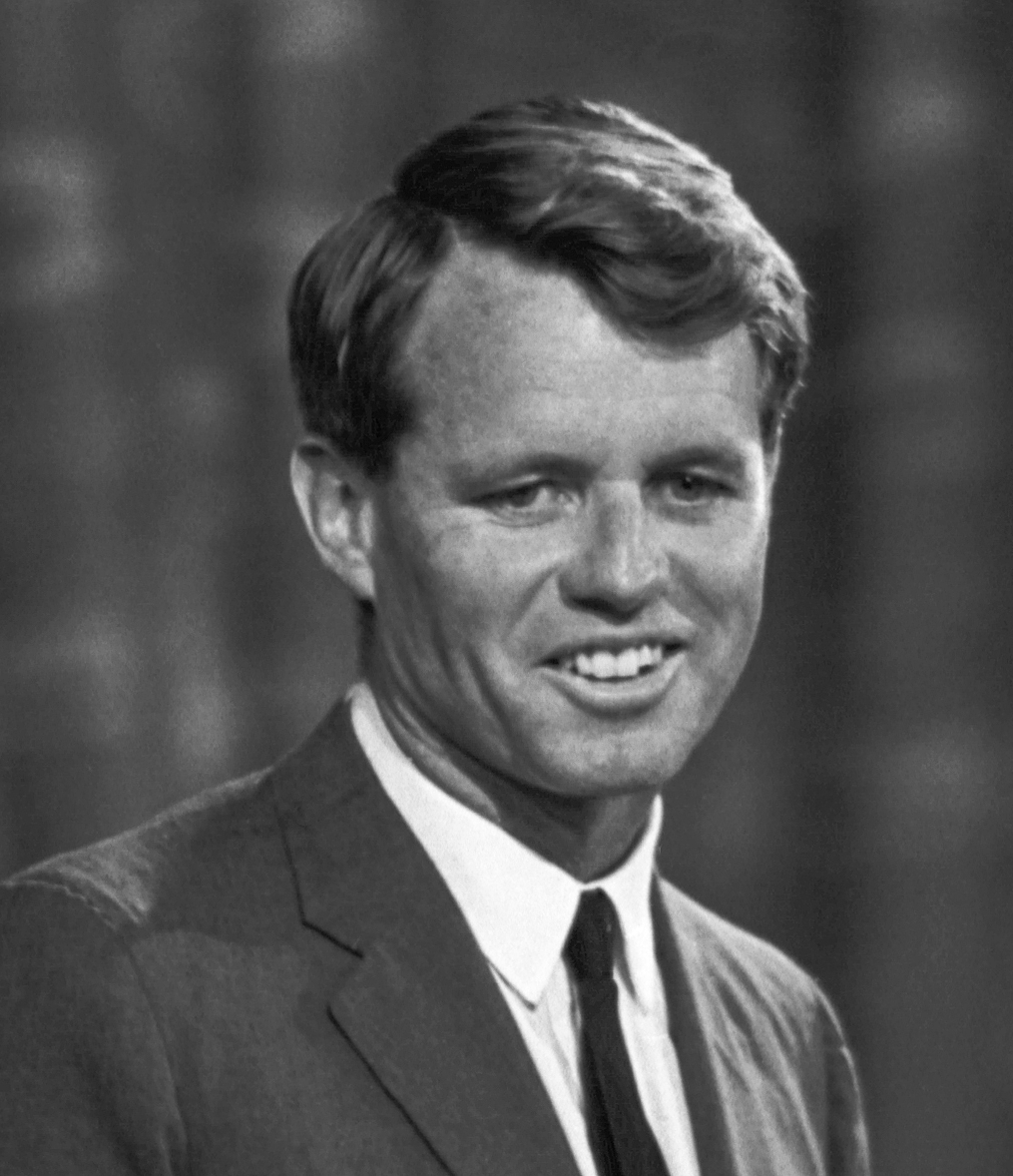
Kennedy

The Baldwin–Kennedy meeting of May 24, 1963, was an attempt to improve race relations in the United States. Attorney General Robert F. Kennedy invited novelist James Baldwin, along with a large group of cultural leaders, to meet Kennedy in an apartment in New York City. The meeting became antagonistic and the group reached no consensus. The black delegation generally felt that Kennedy did not understand the full extent of racism in the United States. Ultimately the meeting demonstrated the urgency of the racial situation and was a positive turning point in Kennedy's attitude towards the Civil Rights Movement.

== Background ==
After formally abolishing slavery, the United States maintained a racist society through Jim Crow laws and other forms of systemic inequality. This racism became increasingly apparent due to many well-publicized instances of police violence against nonviolent direct actions.

As the Birmingham campaign and Birmingham riot of 1963 brought negative attention to urban racism in the United States, U.S. Attorney General Robert Kennedy wanted to prevent similar unrest from taking place in northern cities. Intellectual leader James Baldwin was reportedly already in contact with Kennedy on the topic of Birmingham, calling for an investigation into the role of the FBI and other federal agencies. Baldwin had sent Kennedy a telegram on May 12, 1963, blaming the violence of Bull Connor in Birmingham on the inaction of the federal government, labeling this a moral treason.

At this time, the U.S. was engaged in the Cold War, so it sought to increase its international diplomatic influence and better its reputation with people of color. The country had to contend with the surging movements of social justice and anticolonialism. Highly publicized imagery of racial violence and oppression in the U.S. during 1963 directly conflicted with its diplomatic goals. This led to opposing developments where the U.S. often persecuted civil rights leaders due to McCarthyism, while international pressure aided civil rights progress in the U.S. The international focus on racial issues prodded U.S. media to open up opportunities for civil rights activists and intellectuals to speak to new audiences. International attention also prompted the U.S. government, via the U.S.I.A. and C.I.A., to solicit works by famous artists, including some Black artists, for international distribution.

Baldwin, already a popular novelist, had recently gained additional fame by virtue of The Fire Next Time, a book of two essays urging action against racism in America. Baldwin had become an iconic Black American, and Kennedy sought him out for advice on how to improve race relations. Kennedy had reportedly just read Baldwin's essay, "Letter from a Region in My Mind", when it was released in The New Yorker. Kennedy had also previously met Baldwin, in 1962 at a Nobel Prize dinner and briefly in May 1963 at Hickory Hill. They agreed to meet again, with a group of cultural leaders assembled by Baldwin.

== Meeting ==
According to Clarence Benjamin Jones, an advisor to Martin Luther King Jr. and participant in the eventual meeting, in May 1963, Attorney General Robert Kennedy asked novelist James Baldwin to organize a "quiet, off-the-record, unpublicized get-together of prominent Negroes" to discuss the state of race relations. The meeting took place at an apartment owned by the Kennedy family at 24 Central Park South in New York City.

To meet with Kennedy and his aide Burke Marshall, Baldwin brought:

- David Baldwin, James Baldwin's brother
- Harry Belafonte, singer and activist
- Edwin C. Berry, director of the Chicago Urban League
- Kenneth Clark, psychologist, activist, and founder of Harlem Youth Opportunities Unlimited
- June Shagaloff, Education Director of the NAACP (attending in an "unofficial capacity")
- Lorraine Hansberry, playwright best known for A Raisin in the Sun (1959)
- Lena Horne, musician, actor and activist
- Clarence Benjamin Jones, advisor to Rev. Dr. Martin Luther King Jr. and civil rights lawyer
- Jerome Smith, Freedom Rider associated with the Congress of Racial Equality (CORE)
- Rip Torn, a young white actor
- Eddie Fales, Baldwin's ex, brought as his "secretary"

Jerome Smith was a young black civil rights worker who had been beaten and jailed in Mississippi. Edwin Berry brought him along, and his story was not known by Robert Kennedy or most of those in attendance. Torn later recounted that "the point was we were really there for Jerome Smith...We were hoping to convey to Kennedy that not even the supporters of Gandhian nonviolence were going to continue being victims".

Baldwin explained that he chose to invite: "black or white people whom I trusted, who would not feel themselves compelled to be spokesmen for any organization or responsible for espousing any specific point of view. I called the people who had, I knew, paid some dues and who knew it."

=== Events of the meeting ===
As the meeting got underway and Kennedy began to recount how the Justice Department had been supporting the civil rights movement, Smith suddenly began to weep "as if he'd just suffered some traumatic flashback" and said: "I've seen you guys [referring to the Justice Department] stand around and do nothing more than take notes while we're being beaten." The mood quickly became tense. Smith, James Baldwin later said,

set the tone of the meeting because he stammers when he's upset and he stammered when he talked to Bobby and said that he was nauseated by the necessity of being in that room. I knew what he meant. It was not personal at all. ... Bobby took it personally. Bobby took it personally and turned away from him. That was a mistake because he turned toward us. We were the reasonable, responsible, mature representatives of the Black community. Lorraine Hansberry said, "You've got a great many very, very accomplished people in this room, Mr. Attorney General. But the only man who should be listened to is that man over there."

Kennedy and Smith began to argue. Kennedy was particularly shocked when Smith said he would "never never never" join the military to fight against Cuba for the United States. The assembled group felt, generally, that Kennedy did not understand the depth of the problem at hand. Baldwin later explained his personal take: "it was a great shock to me that the Attorney General did not know that I would have trouble convincing my nephew to go to Cuba to liberate the Cubans in defense of a government which says it is doing everything it can and can't liberate me".

In Sighted Eyes / Feeling Heart, a documentary about Lorraine Hansberry which aired on the PBS series American Masters in 2018, Harry Belafonte recalled that at this point Smith "bared his soul and all his pain and then said very aggressively 'Let me tell you something, in the midst of our oppression you expect to find us giddily going off to fight a war (i.e., Vietnam) that's your war, that's unjust, unfair, and so dishonorable it should shame you. I wouldn't pick up a gun to fight for this country. I'd die first.'" According to Baldwin, this statement caused the meeting's irreversible shift toward acrimony, and Kennedy's face turned purple but he remained silent.

Hansberry told Kennedy: "Look, if you can't understand what this young man is saying, then we are without any hope at all because you and your brother are representatives of the best that a White America can offer; and if you are insensitive to this, then there's no alternative except our going in the streets ... and chaos". Arthur Schlesinger recorded Kennedy's recollection in his presidential biography: "she talked wildly about giving guns to Negroes in the street so they could start killing white people." Jerome Smith told Kennedy: "I'm close to the moment where I'm ready to take up a gun."

Kennedy said that his family, immigrants from Ireland, had suffered discrimination upon arriving in America but were able to overcome their hardships to achieve political success, and that the U.S. might have a black president in 40 years. (Note: The first Black president, Barack Obama, was inaugurated roughly 46 years after Kennedy's remarks.) David Baldwin observed that his family had been in the country far longer than Kennedy's, yet had barely been permitted to climb out of poverty. Kennedy later said: "They seemed possessed. They reacted as a unit. It was impossible to make contact with any of them."

The meeting ended after two and a half or three hours, when Hansberry walked out and most of the others followed. According to Schlesinger, Clark described the meeting as the "most intense, traumatic interchange among adults, head-to-head, no holds barred . . . the most dramatic experience I have ever had."

=== Reactions in the press ===
The morning of the meeting, Baldwin sat for an interview with New York Times columnist Lewis Funke to discuss Baldwin's play Blues for Mister Charlie. According to Funke, Baldwin told him that he had met with Kennedy and Burke Marshall the previous day, and would attend a secret meeting with Kennedy that day. Funke recalled that he asked Baldwin if he could share this with the Times, and Baldwin said he didn't mind.

The New York Times published a short notice about the meeting the day after it occurred, titled "Robert Kennedy Consults Negroes Here About North". It included photos of Baldwin and Hansberry, labeling them "angry young Negroes". Hansberry also told reporters that she did not want the meeting to be used merely as a photo-op for Cold War goals.

Though billed as off-the-record, details of the meeting were recounted a few weeks later in another New York Times article by James Reston about the Kennedy administration's approach to race relations. Reston's summary provides only Robert Kennedy's perspective on the meeting, offering his appraisal that the problem was one of both "militant Negro and white leaders" and stating that the attorney general "apparently has little faith in the quieter moderate leaders of both races."

As Clarence Jones served as the attorney representing Martin Luther King Jr. at the meeting, he strongly disputed Reston's account of the meeting and issued a detailed, four-page letter to the editor of the New York Times, with copy to Robert Kennedy, providing his alternative assessment of the meeting. Directly challenging the perception given in Reston's coverage of the meeting, that "a lawyer for Dr. King had remained silent throughout the meeting (the implication being as a 'moderate' such a lawyer was intimidated from speaking)," Jones summarized four areas of discussion in which he had actively engaged with the Attorney General during the meeting.

Specifically, Jones notes that he had requested that the President personally accompany University of Alabama students as a way to help assure successful integration. He directed the Attorney General's attention to the appointment of certain judges by his administration who, in Jones' opinion, "had openly and avowedly, prior to their appointment, indicated their flagrant segregationist views." He raised the idea of the President making a series of televised speeches addressing the elimination of segregation and discrimination. Finally, he participated in the discussion of the role and effectiveness of some white Southern FBI agents in civil rights cases.

== Aftermath ==
Despite feeling emotional and overwhelmed in the aftermath of the meeting, Baldwin and Clark arrived (half an hour late) to WGBH, where Clark interviewed Baldwin on tape.

"We were a little shocked at the extent of his naivete," Baldwin was quoted as saying. "We told him that though the Kennedy administration has done some things the Eisenhower administration never did, its actions have yet to affect the masses of Negro people."

After the meeting, Robert Kennedy ordered FBI director J. Edgar Hoover to increase surveillance of Baldwin and tap the home phone of Jones. A memo issued four days after the meeting asked the FBI to produce information, "particularly of a derogatory nature." A subsequent report labeled Baldwin both a "pervert" and a "communist." Actor Rip Torn discovered that he also had been placed under surveillance after the meeting. Baldwin also says he suffered retaliation from the State Department, including interference with his passport.

Harry Belafonte recalled Martin Luther King Jr. calling him the following day wanting to know the details of the meeting. When Belafonte described the "disaster," and Jerome Smith's "fighting words," King said, "Maybe it's just what Bobby needed to hear."

Jones recalled Martin Luther King Jr. saying shortly after the dust-up, "Looks like the Attorney General of the United States regards you as an uppity Negro. But that's all right. We still love you. You're our uppity Negro."

To his biographer, Arthur Schlesinger, Kennedy said ("his voice filled with despair"):

They don't know what the laws are—they don't know what the facts are—they don't know what we've been doing or what we're trying to do. You can't talk to them the way you can talk to Martin Luther King or Roy Wilkins. They didn't want to talk that way. It was all emotion, hysteria—they stood up and orated—they cursed—some of them wept and left the room.

Schlesinger and others nevertheless describe the moment as a long-term turning point in RFK's attitude towards the Black liberation struggle. Less than one month later, President Kennedy gave his landmark Civil Rights Address. Robert Kennedy was the only White House adviser to actively encourage his brother to give the speech, in which the president publicly proposed legislation that would become the Civil Rights Act of 1964. Revisiting the issue of military service, Robert Kennedy later asked the Senate Judiciary Committee: "How long can we say to a Negro in Jackson, 'When war comes you will be an American citizen, but in the meantime you're a citizen of Mississippi—and we can't help you'?"

== See also ==
- James Baldwin: A Soul on Fire
- March on Washington for Jobs and Freedom
