= Sing Your Song =

2011 documentary film about Harry Belafonte

- Promotional release poster
- Directed by: Susanne Rostock
- Written by: Susanne Rostock
- Produced by: Michael Cohl; Gina Belafonte; Jim Brown; William Eigen; Julius R. Nasso
- Starring: Harry Belafonte
- Edited by: Jason L. Pollard; Susanne Rostock
- Music by: Hahn Rowe
- Release dates: January 21, 2011 (Sundance); September 2, 2011 (United States)
- Running time: 104 minutes
- Country: United States
- Language: English
- Box office: $45,765

Sing Your Song is a 2011 American documentary film about singer, actor, and civil rights activist Harry Belafonte. The film recounts his life and legacy, not only as a great entertainer, but as an important activist in the Civil Rights Movement.

This inspirational biographical film begins with Belafonte's birth into poverty in Harlem, New York, in 1927, and his childhood years in Jamaica, where he was sent by his immigrant mother. Director Susanne Rostock takes the viewer through Belafonte's discovery of theater and his training as a young man to be an actor, and on to his career and success as a singer.

The film shows not only Belafonte's remarkable success as a singer and actor, but also his true passion for social change. The film outlines some highlights of his entertainment career, but is more focused on how he helped change the world in other ways: marching with the Rev. Martin Luther King Jr. in the civil-rights era; working against apartheid in South Africa; fighting hunger through his instrumental work with USA for Africa; and, most recently, working to combat gang violence through programs with inner-city youth.

In an interview about the film, Belafonte discussed his activism from Civil Rights to poverty in Africa.

== Reception ==
On the review aggregator website Rotten Tomatoes, 95% of 40 critics' reviews are positive. The website's consensus reads: "Sing Your Song takes an absorbing -- if decidedly non-critical -- look at an incredible show business career and admirable public life." Metacritic, which uses a weighted average, assigned the film a score of 73 out of 100, based on 9 critics, indicating "generally favorable" reviews.

The film won an award in the "American Docs" category at the second American Film Festival.

At the 2011 Vancouver International Film Festival, Sing Your Song won the Most Popular Nonfiction Film Award, which is based on ballots cast by audiences at the festival.

Belafonte presented the film as the Closing Night selection of the Maryland Film Festival 2011.

The film advanced to the final 15 contenders for the Academy Award for Best Documentary Feature but was not nominated.

On January 10, 2012, REACT to FILM screened Sing Your Song at the Museum of Modern Art in Manhattan, New York, and moderated a Q&A with Belafonte.

In a review in The Observer, critic Philip French described Sing Your Song as "a skilfully compiled celebratory biography", writing: "This excellent film, eloquently narrated by its octogenarian subject in that wonderfully husky voice, carefully balances an account of his career in showbusiness with his 50-year commitment to civil and human rights in America and around the world, not just for fellow African-Americans but for Native Americans, Hispanics and people throughout Africa....[Belafonte] emerges at the end as a man of bravery and probity, a formidable contributor and witness to his times."

The Hollywood Reporter observed: "Susanne Rostock's Sing Your Song, which views the extraordinary career of entertainer Harry Belafonte through the prism of his tireless social activism, is less a true documentary than a call to action for viewers to emulate the singer’s example." As the reviewer for The Irish Times notes: "The title Sing Your Song comes from advice imparted by Paul Robeson: 'Get them to sing your song and they'll want to know who you are.' This stirring film, fashioned by editing suite veteran Susanne Rostock, does justice to the notion."
