= June Shagaloff Alexander =

US civil rights activist (1928–2022)

- Born: June 14, 1928; New York City, New York, U.S.
- Died: March 29, 2022 (aged 93); Tel Aviv, Israel
- Education: University of Cincinnati; New York University (BA)
- Occupation: Activist
- Organization: National Association for the Advancement of Colored People (NAACP)
- Movement: Civil Rights Movement
- Spouse: Michael Alexander (1970–1992)
- Children: 1 son

June Shagaloff Alexander (June 14, 1928 – March 29, 2022) was an American civil rights activist.

== Early life ==
June Shagaloff Alexander was born in 1928 in New York City. Her parents, Samuel Shagaloff and Gertrude Bellinson, emigrated to the United States from Russia in 1905. Their household was secular Jewish, and valued socialist ideals. Her father was a pharmacist who owned and managed a drugstore, first in Merrick and then in Baldwin, Long Island. As a child, she spent time at her father's store and, in the summer, at nearby Jones Beach. Some people believed she was African-American and, at an early age, she experienced racial discrimination. These experiences left a lasting impression, and contributed to her civil rights activism as an adult. In 1946, she enrolled at the Cincinnati Conservatory of Music of the University of Cincinnati, and graduated from New York University in 1950 with a degree in Sociology with honors.

== Civil Rights Work ==
In 1950, June Shagaloff joined the NAACP Legal Defense and Education Fund, headed by Thurgood Marshall, who hired her at the end of an undergraduate internship. Marshall, who would later become a Justice of the United States Supreme Court, believed that the success of litigation depended on its impact on families and their willingness to demand desegregation and send their children to desegregated schools. Consequently, he hired Shagaloff, one of two staff members of the department who was not a lawyer, to conduct social research and organize communities around issues of school desegregation. As one of her first assignments, in 1952 Marshall sent her to Cairo, Illinois to help the NAACP branch end school segregation. While she was in Cairo, she was arrested for conspiring to "endanger the health and life of certain children." Marshall immediately flew to Cairo and, after many hours at the jailhouse, negotiated her release.

On another assignment, she helped develop the social research which was critical in the Legal Defense Fund's victory in the Supreme Court's 1954 decision in Brown v. Board of Education, which ended legal segregation in America. She aided psychologist Kenneth Clark in examining experiences of children in segregated schools and in the process of desegregating various institutions. They found that children in segregated schools that offered similar material resources were nevertheless impacted negatively by the fact of segregation, including the development of lower esteem and motivation levels. This research led the Supreme Court to overcome the "Separate but Equal" doctrine that had been established in the 19th century by Plessy v. Ferguson. Clark and Shagaloff Alexander also found no evidence that gradual desegregation offered advantages over quick action, which led to the NAACP's position that desegregation must be implemented quickly to be effective. Also in preparation for arguments in the Brown case, she researched congressional hearings on the Fourteenth Amendment to discern the extent to which drafters intended equality to include education, working with historian John Hope Franklin. The Supreme Court ruled in favor of the NAACP, ending legal segregation, on May 17, 1954. After the Brown decision, she continued her work at the Legal Defense Fund on education issues and school desegregation.

In 1961, she became the first Education Director of the national NAACP, then headed by Roy Wilkins. Her work organizing local communities together with local chapters of the NAACP, fighting for desegregation, and mobilizing parents brought her to many towns and cities across the United States. Shagaloff led and directed the new national NAACP school desegregation program in the North and West, in scores of communities from Boston to San Francisco, which led to the desegregation and integration of public schools across the United States. On occasions, she worked with various civil rights leaders, such as Martin Luther King Jr., tried to influence political leaders, such as Robert F. Kennedy, together with James Baldwin (Baldwin–Kennedy meeting), gave speeches, and wrote articles. Shagaloff Alexander retired from the NAACP in 1972. In recent years, her work has been recognized in historical accounts of the civil rights movement, and she received awards honoring her work and its impact.

== Later Activities ==
June Shagaloff married Michael Alexander in 1970, and they have a son named David. In 1972, they moved to Israel, living in Ashkelon until 1983. Alexander helped found the Ashkelon chapter of Peace Now and taught English to elementary school students. In 1983, she moved with her family to Amityville, NY, where she was active with the local NAACP chapter and then, in 1984, to West Nyack, New York. She has been active in the Clarkstown PTA and was a member of the Board of Directors of West Street Child Care Learning Center. She lived in Tel Aviv, Israel.

== Legacy ==
Although often working behind the scenes, June Shagaloff Alexander played a critical role in shaping the legal and strategic battles for school desegregation in the United States. As an investigator and strategist for the NAACP Legal Defense Fund and later, as the first Education Director of the NAACP, she spearheaded efforts to create and enforce desegregation rulings, challenging school districts across the US that resisted integration. Her advocacy extended beyond the South, where de jure segregation was most visible, to northern cities where racial disparities in education were maintained through discriminatory zoning and school policies. Shagaloff Alexander was also a key proponent of proactive integration policies to combat systemic segregation. While less publicly known than some of her prominent contemporaries, her community organization and fieldwork, research, and strategy were instrumental in dismantling legal segregation in education and shaping the broader civil rights movement and efforts toward educational equity.
