= Railroad Revival Tour =

Folk music concert tour

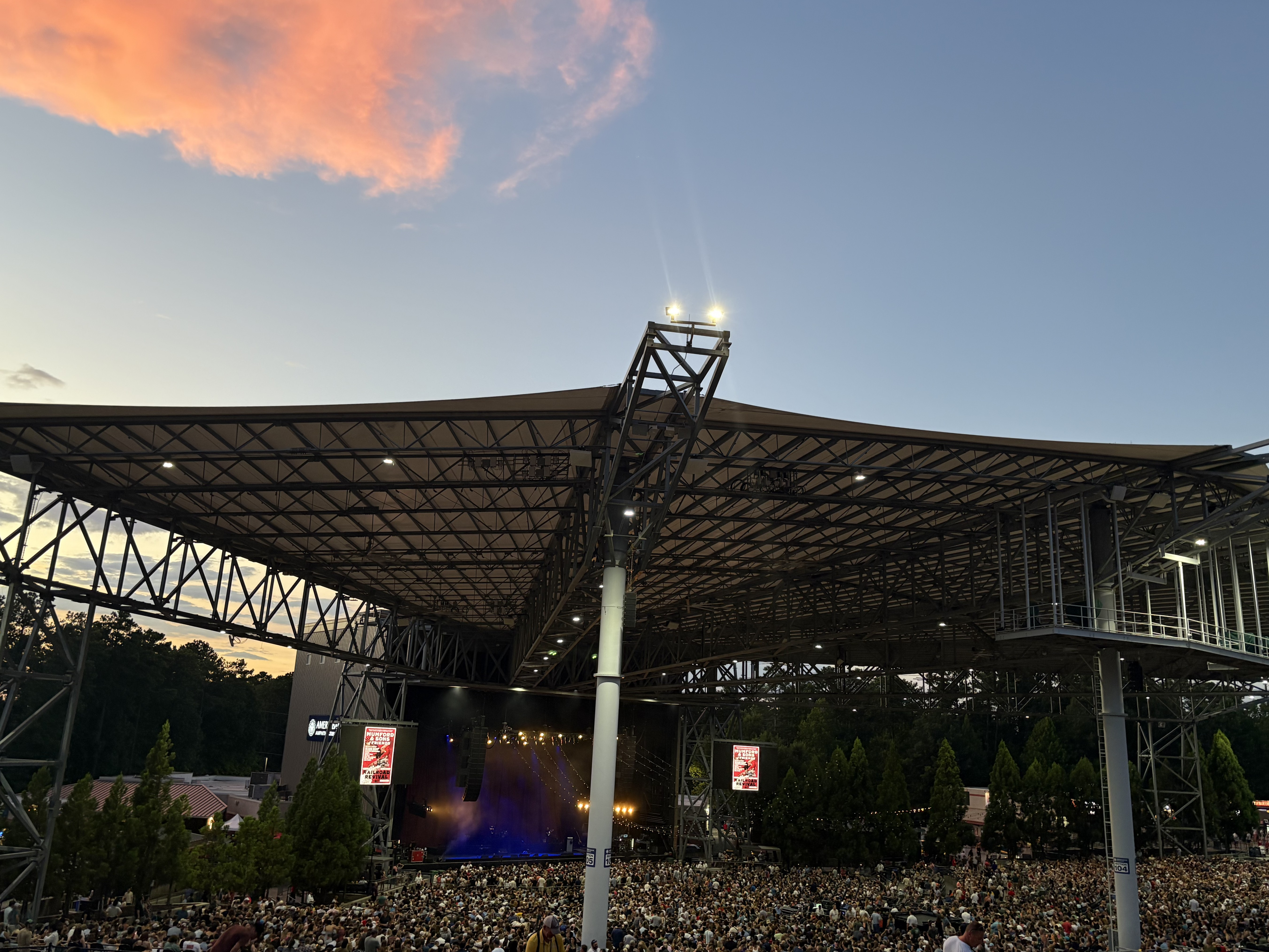
Mumford & Sons concert in Alpharetta, Georgia preceding the 2025 tour

The Railroad Revival Tour is a music festival tour that launched in 2011 featuring popular roots, folk, country, rock, bluegrass and Americana acts.

The musicians travelled between shows across the American Southwest in 17 vintage train cars from the 1940s, 1950s and 1960s. The outdoor concert locations, sometimes attracting over 10,000 fans, are often a stone's throw from the train. The bands eat, sleep and engage in impromptu jam sessions on the train between stops, giving them a chance to collaborate. On stage at night, they often join in on each other's sets, sometimes bringing around 30 musicians up to create a rare and rowdy performance. The organic American roots feeling of the tour also prompts participating musicians to honor U.S. railway history, like Mumford & Sons' tribute to Woody Guthrie in 2011.

The tour included performances by Mumford & Sons, Edward Sharpe and the Magnetic Zeros, and Old Crow Medicine Show. A documentary, called Big Easy Express, directed by Emmett Malloy premiered at SXSW 2012 and won a Grammy Award in 2013. The film is currently available on iTunes and DVD/Blu-ray Disc.

Railroad Revival Tour bands Mumford & Sons, Edward Sharpe and the Magnetic Zeros, and Old Crow Medicine Show closed the show together at every stop with "This Train Is Bound for Glory."

The 2012 tour was slated to include performances by Willie Nelson, Band of Horses, Jamey Johnson, and John Reilly and Friends. The tour was cancelled for 2012.

Mumford & Sons resumed the tour in 2025.

== Tour dates ==
2011 shows
| Date | City | Country | Venue |
|---|---|---|---|
| April 21, 2011 | Oakland | United States | Middle Harbor Shoreline Park |
| April 22, 2011 | Los Angeles | United States | Ports O' Call Village |
| April 23, 2011 | Tempe | United States | Vacant lot Originally scheduled for the Arizona Railway Museum in Chandler. |
| April 24, 2011 | Marfa | United States | El Cosmico |
| April 26, 2011 | Austin | United States | 4th and Waller Street |
| April 27, 2011 | New Orleans | United States | Woldenberg Park |

2025 shows
| Date | City | Country | Venue |
|---|---|---|---|
| August 3, 2025 | New Orleans | United States | Woldenberg Park |
| August 4, 2025 | Simpsonville | United States | Originally scheduled for Piedmont Fairgrounds in Spartanburg |
| August 5, 2025 | Richmond | United States | Allianz Ampitheater |
| August 7, 2025 | Burlington | United States | Champlain Valley Exposition Center |
