= Big Easy Express =

2012 longform music film directed by Emmett Malloy

- Big Easy Express Movie Poster
- Directed by: Emmett Malloy
- Produced by: Bryan Ling; Tim Lynch; Mike Luba
- Starring: Edward Sharpe and the Magnetic Zeros; Mumford & Sons; Old Crow Medicine Show
- Cinematography: Giles Dunning
- Edited by: Matt Murphy
- Music by: Mumford & Sons, Edward Sharpe and the Magnetic Zeros, and Old Crow Medicine Show
- Distributed by: S2BN Films
- Release dates: March 17, 2012 (SXSW); June 26, 2012 (United States - iTunes)
- Running time: 66 Minutes
- Country: United States
- Language: English

Big Easy Express is a music film by the three folk and americana bands: Old Crow Medicine Show, Edward Sharpe and the Magnetic Zeros, and Mumford & Sons. This Emmett Malloy film follows the three bands on their joint April 2011 Railroad Revival Tour. The film won the 2013 Grammy Award for Best Music Film.

== Release and Reception ==
The film debuted on March 17th, the final night of the 2012 SXSW film festival to positive critical reviews. The film also won the Headliner Audience Award at SXSW that year.

Despite the commercial and critical success of the featured bands, Mumford & Sons had received two Grammy nominations the previous year, while recent albums by Old Crow Medicine Show and Edward Sharpe and the Magnetic Zeros had charted in the top 100 of the Billboard 200, Big Easy Express did not follow a traditional theatrical release strategy. Instead, the film employed a "running-in-reverse" distribution model, launching first on iTunes in 50 countries on June 26, 2012, followed by a DVD release on July 24, and concluding with a theatrical release several months later. The theatrical release was facilitated through a partnership between Magnolia Pictures and Gathr, which used an audience-demand model allowing viewers to reserve screenings in theaters across the United States Followed by a digital release, the film continued to receive favorable reviews.

In 2013, Big Easy Express was awarded the Grammy Award for Best Music Film.
