= Harry Belafonte discography =

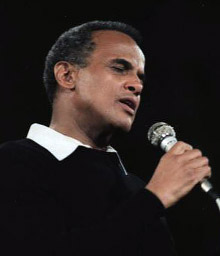
- Harry Belafonte in 1983
- Studio albums: 27
- Live albums: 8
- Compilation albums: 8
- Collaborations: 6

This article presents the discography of American musician, singer, actor and social activist, Harry Belafonte (1927–2023).

== Albums ==
=== Studio albums ===
Title	Album details	Peak chart positions			Certifications (sales thresholds)
Title	Album details	US	KOR	NLD	Certifications (sales thresholds)
Mark Twain and Other Folk Favorites	Released: 1954; Label: RCA Victor	3	—	—	
Belafonte	Released: 1956; Label: RCA Victor	1	—	—	RIAA: Gold
Calypso	Released: 1956; Label: RCA Victor	1	—	—	RIAA: Gold
An Evening with Belafonte	Released: 1957; Label: RCA Victor	2	—	—	RIAA: Gold
Belafonte Sings of the Caribbean	Released: 1957; Label: RCA Victor	3	—	—	
To Wish You a Merry Christmas	Released: 1958; Label: RCA Victor	125	—	—	
Belafonte Sings the Blues	Released: 1958; Label: RCA Victor	16	—	—	
Love Is a Gentle Thing	Released: 1959; Label: RCA Victor	18	—	—	
My Lord What a Mornin'	Released: 1960; Label: RCA Victor	34	—	—	
Swing Dat Hammer	Released: 1960; Label: RCA Victor	—	—	—	
Jump Up Calypso	Released: 1961; Label: RCA Victor	3	—	—	RIAA: Gold
Midnight Special	Released: 1962; Label: RCA Victor	8	—	—	
The Many Moods of Belafonte	Released: 1962; Label: RCA Victor	25	—	—	
Streets I Have Walked	Released: 1963; Label: RCA Victor	30	96	—	
Ballads, Blues and Boasters	Released: 1964; Label: RCA Victor	103	—	—	
In My Quiet Room	Released: 1966; Label: RCA Victor	82	—	—	
Calypso in Brass	Released: 1966; Label: RCA Victor	172	—	—	
Belafonte on Campus	Released: 1967; Label: RCA Victor	199	—	—	
Belafonte Sings of Love	Released: 1968; Label: RCA Victor	—	—	—	
Homeward Bound	Released: 1970; Label: RCA Victor	192	—	—	
Belafonte by Request	Released: 1970; Label: RCA Victor	—	—	—	
The Warm Touch	Released: 1971; Label: RCA Victor	—	—	—	
Calypso Carnival	Released: 1971; Label: RCA Victor	—	—	—	
Play Me	Released: 1973; Label: RCA Victor	—	—	—	
Turn the World Around	Released: 1977; Label: Columbia	—	—	—	
Loving You Is Where I Belong	Released: 1981; Label: Columbia	—	—	—	
Paradise in Gazankulu	Released: 1988; Label: EMI	—	—	31	
"—" denotes a recording that did not chart or was not released in that territory.

=== Live albums ===
Title	Album details	Peak chart positions				Certifications (sales thresholds)
Title	Album details	US	AUT	GER	NLD	Certifications (sales thresholds)
Belafonte at Carnegie Hall	Released: 1959; Label: RCA Victor	3	—	—	—	RIAA: Gold
Belafonte Returns to Carnegie Hall	Released: 1960; Label: RCA Victor	3	—	—	—	RIAA: Gold
Belafonte at The Greek Theatre	Released: 1964; Label: RCA Victor	17	—	—	—	
Belafonte...Live!	Released: 1972; Label: RCA Victor	—	—	—	—	
Belafonte Concert in Japan	Released: 1974; Label: RCA	—	—	—	—	
Belafonte '89	Released: 1989; Label: EMI	—	26	11	39	
An Evening with Harry Belafonte and Friends	Released: 1997; Label: Island	—	—	87	—	

=== Select compilations ===
Title	Album details	Peak chart positions				
Title	Album details	DEN	GER	NLD	NOR	NZ
This Is Harry Belafonte	Released: 1970; Label: RCA Victor	—	—	—	—	—
Abraham, Martin and John	Released: 1974; Label: RCA Camden	—	—	—	—	—
Harry Belafonte - Pure Gold	Released: 1975; Label: RCA	—	3	3	—	—
Harry Belafonte - A Legendary Performer	Released: 1978; Label: RCA	—	—	—	—	—
Greatest Hits	Released: 2000; Label: BMG	16	—	—	9	4
Island in the Sun: The Complete Recordings 1949 – 1957	Released: 2002; Label: Bear Family	—	—	—	—	—
The Essential Harry Belafonte	Released: 2005; Label: Legacy	—	—	—	—	—
Playlist: The Very Best of Harry Belafonte	Released: 2012; Label: Legacy	—	—	—	—	—

=== Collaborations ===
Title	Album details	Peak chart positions
Title	Album details	US
Porgy and Bess	Released: 1959; Label: RCA	13
An Evening with Belafonte/Makeba	Released: 1965; Label: RCA	85
An Evening with Belafonte/Mouskouri	Released: 1966; Label: RCA	124
Harry & Lena, For the Love of Life	Released: 1970; Label: RCA	—
The Tradition Of Christmas	Released: 1991; Label: Hallmark Cards Inc.	—
The Long Road to Freedom: An Anthology of Black Music	Released: 2001; Label: Buddha Records/BMG	—

== Singles ==
Title	Year	Peak chart positions										Certifications	Album
Title	Year	US	US AC	AUT	BEL (FL)	BEL (WA)	FRA	GER	NLD	NZ	UK	Certifications	Album
"Gomen Nasai (Forgive Me)"	1953	19	—	—	—	—	—	—	—	—	—		Island in the Sun: The Complete Recordings 1949-1957
"Jamaica Farewell"	1956	14	—	—	—	—	—	—	—	—	—		Calypso
"Mary's Boy Child"	1956	12	—	—	—	—	—	—	20	—	1		An Evening with Belafonte
"The Blues Is Man"	1956	—	—	—	—	—	171	—	—	—	—		Island in the Sun: The Complete Recordings 1949-1957
"Banana Boat (Day-O)"	1956	5	—	—	1	1	18	—	1	48	2	RMNZ: Gold	Calypso
"Hold 'Em Joe"	1957	84	—	—	—	—	—	—	—	—	—		Island in the Sun: The Complete Recordings 1949-1957
"Mama Look a Boo Boo"	1957	11	—	—	—	—	—	—	—	—	—		Calypso in Brass
"Don't Ever Love Me"	1957	90	—	—	—	—	—	—	—	—	—		Belafonte Sings of the Caribbean
"Coconut Woman"	1957	25	—	—	—	—	—	—	—	—	—		Belafonte Sings of the Caribbean
"Island in the Sun"	1957	30	—	—	5	9	—	67	6	—	3		Belafonte Sings of the Caribbean
"Scarlet Ribbons" (with Millard Thomas)	1957	—	—	—	—	—	—	—	—	—	18		Belafonte
"The Marching Saints"	1958	—	—	—	13	23	—	—	—	—	—		Belafonte at Carnegie Hall
"Little Bernadette"	1958	—	—	—	—	—	—	—	—	—	16		Little Bernadette
"The Son of Mary"	1958	—	—	—	—	—	—	—	—	—	18		To Wish You a Merry Christmas
"Round the Bay of Mexico"	1959	—	—	—	—	—	—	—	11	—	—		A Man and His Music
"Hole in the Bucket" (with Odetta)	1961	—	—	—	—	—	—	—	—	—	32		Belafonte Returns to Carnegie Hall
"A Strange Song"	1967	—	5	—	—	—	—	—	—	—	—		-
"By the Time I Get to Phoenix"	1968	—	38	—	—	—	—	—	—	—	—		Belafonte Sings of Love
"Skin to Skin" (with Jennifer Warnes)	1988	—	—	13	14	—	—	73	25	—	—		Paradise in Gazankulu
"—" denotes a recording that did not chart or was not released in that territory.													

=== Other certified songs ===
Title	Year	Certifications	Album
"Jump in the Line (Shake, Senora)"	1961	BPI: Silver; RMNZ: Gold	Jump Up Calypso

== Concert videos ==
- Global Carnival (VHS, 1988)
- Don't Stop the Carnival (VHS, 1991)
- An Evening With Harry Belafonte & Friends (VHS/DVD, 1997)
- Listen to the Man (DVD)
