= The Essential Harry Belafonte =

Greatest hits album by Harry Belafonte
- Released: October 4, 2005
- Recorded: 1952–1977
- Genre: Calypso
- Label: Legacy
- Producer: Bob Bollard, Frantz Casseus, Bill Eaton, Dennis Farnon, Hy Grill, Dave Kapp, Jack Pleis, Phil Ramone, Edward Welker, Andy Wiswell

Harry Belafonte chronology
Matilda, Matilda: Original Recordings 1949-1954 (2005)	The Essential Harry Belafonte (2005)	The Original (2005)

Professional ratings
Review scores
Source	Rating
AllMusic	4.5/5 stars

The Essential Harry Belafonte is a two-disc compilation recording by Harry Belafonte, issued in 2005. The 37 tracks span Belafonte's career from 1952 to 1977, on RCA Victor and a few later tracks released by Columbia Records. All recordings for inclusion were selected by Belafonte himself.

AllMusic stated: "Harry Belafonte's influence on pop music is much more far reaching then many realize, as he was one of the first performers to bring worldbeat rhythms to the U.S. charts in the postwar era... Innovative, intelligent, and unceasingly creative, Belafonte is long overdue for a critical reappraisal."

== Track listing ==
1. "Midnight Special" (traditional) – 3:57
2. "Island in the Sun" (Harry Belafonte, Lord Burgess) – 3:23
3. "Zombie Jamboree (Back to Back)" (Dr. Conrad Eugene Maugé Jr. PhD; arranged by Bob Freedman) – 3:20
4. "Delia" (Fred Hellerman, Lester Judson) – 3:39
5. "Cocoanut Woman" (Belafonte, Lord Burgess) – 3:22
6. "Danny Boy" [live] (Frederic Edward Weatherly) – 5:21
7. "Jamaica Farewell" (Lord Burgess) – 3:03
8. "Turn the World Around" (Belafonte, Robert Freedman) – 4:29
9. "The First Time Ever I Saw Your Face" (Ewan MacColl) – 4:07
10. "Cu Cu Ru Cu Cu Paloma" (Tomás Méndez) – 5:30
11. "I'm Just a Country Boy" (Fred Hellerman, Marshall Barer) – 3:05
12. "Venezuela" (traditional) – 2:58
13. "Hava Nageela" (traditional; arranged by William Lorin) – 3:10
14. "Scarlet Ribbons (For Her Hair)" (Jack Edward Segal, Evelyn Danzig) – 2:46
15. "Man Smart (Woman Smarter)" (Norman Span) – 2:34
16. "Shenandoah" (public domain) – 3:46
17. "Angelina" (Irving Burgie) – 3:56
18. "Matilda" (King Radio; arranged by Harry Belafonte and Millard J. Thomas) – 3:13
19. "Empty Chairs" (Don McLean) – 5:20
20. "Jump in the Line (Shake, Senora)" (Lord Kitchener) – 4:22
21. "Jerry (This Timber Got to Roll)" (Public Domain) – 2:19
22. "Waly Waly" (traditional; arranged by Bill Eaton) – 4:44
23. "In That Great Gettin' Up Mornin'" (Belafonte, Norman Luboff) – 3:18
24. "Cotton Fields" [live] (Huddie Ledbetter, Charles Carl Carter) – 4:29
25. "And I Love You So" (Don McLean) – 4:41
26. "Those Three Are on My Mind" (Pete Seeger, Frances Taylor) – 3:47
27. "Goin' Down Jordan" (Lord Burgess, Theophilus Woods) – 5:37
28. "Abraham, Martin & John" (Dick Holler) – 4:22
29. "On Top of Old Smokey" (traditional) – 5:59
30. "My Lord What a Mornin'" (Belafonte, Bob Corman, Milt Okun) – 4:29
31. "Jump Down, Spin Around" (William Attaway, Belafonte, Norman Luboff) – 2:00
32. "Mary's Boy Child" (Jester Hairston) – 4:23
33. "Mama Look a Boo Boo" [live] (Lord Melody) – 5:18
34. "(There's A) Hole in the Bucket" (Belafonte, Odetta) – 8:49
35. "Take My Mother Home" (Hall Johnson) – 5:55
36. "Try to Remember" (Tom Jones, Harvey Schmidt) – 4:08
37. "Banana Boat Song (Day O)" [live] (traditional; arranged by Lord Burgess and William Attaway) – 3:48

== Personnel ==
- Harry Belafonte – vocals
