= Belafonte at Carnegie Hall =

Live album by Harry Belafonte
- Released: October 1959
- Recorded: April 19 and 20, 1959
- Venue: Carnegie Hall, New York City
- Length: 71:24 (CD)
- Label: RCA Victor; LOC-6006; 6006-R; 07863-56006
- Producer: Bob Bollard

Harry Belafonte chronology
Love is a Gentle Thing (1959)	Belafonte at Carnegie Hall (1959)	Porgy and Bess (1959)

Professional ratings
Review scores
Source	Rating
Billboard	positive ("Spotlight" pick)
AllMusic	5/5 stars
The Encyclopedia of Popular Music	4/5 stars
The Rolling Stone Album Guide	4/5 stars

Belafonte at Carnegie Hall is a live double album by Harry Belafonte issued by RCA Victor.

== Background ==
It is the first of two Belafonte Carnegie Hall albums, and was recorded on April 19 and April 20, 1959. The concerts were benefits for The New Lincoln School and Wiltwyck School, respectively. The album stayed on the charts for over three years, peaking at No. 1

The album was nominated for Album of the Year at the 1959 Grammy Awards.

== Critical reception ==
The Rolling Stone Album Guide wrote that the album captured "a spectacular live performance."

== CD track listing ==
The original US RCA compact disc reissue on a single disc, omitted four tracks. There have been several 2 disc reissues since, that include all tracks (see LP track listing).

1. "Introduction/Darlin' Cora" – 3:59
2. "Sylvie" – 4:54
3. "Cotton Fields" – 4:18
4. "John Henry" – 5:11
5. "The Marching Saints" – 2:50
6. "The Banana Boat Song (Day-O)" – 3:40
7. "Jamaica Farewell" – 5:10
8. "Mama Look a Boo Boo" – 5:24
9. "Come Back Liza" – 3:06
10. "Man Smart (Woman Smarter)" – 4:23
11. "Hava Nagila" (Traditional) – 4:03
12. "Danny Boy" – 5:21
13. "Cucurucucú paloma" – 3:50
14. "Shenandoah" – 3:48
15. "Matilda" – 11:27

== Original LP track listing ==
"ACT I-MOODS OF THE AMERICAN NEGRO"

=== Side one ===
1. "Introduction/Darlin' Cora" (Fred Brooks)
2. "Sylvie" (Huddie Ledbetter, Paul Campbell)
3. "Cotton Fields" (C. C. Carter)
4. "John Henry" (Paul Campbell)
5. **"Take My Mother Home**" (Paul Johnson)

=== Side two ===
1. "The Marching Saints" (C. C. Carter)

"ACT II-IN THE CARIBBEAN"

1. "The Banana Boat Song (Day-O)" (Harry Belafonte, Lord Burgess, William Attaway)
2. "Jamaica Farewell" (Lord Burgess)
3. "**Man Piaba**" (Harry Belafonte, Jack Rollins)
4. "**All My Trials**" (Rita Greene, C. C. Carter)

=== Side three ===
1. "Mama Look a Boo Boo" (Lord Melody)
2. "Come Back Liza" (Lord Burgess, William Attaway)
3. "Man Smart (Woman Smarter)" (Harry Belafonte, Jack Segal)

"ACT III-ROUND THE WORLD"

1. "Hava Nagila" (arr. Harry Belafonte)
2. "Danny Boy" (Fred Weatherly)
3. "**Merci Bon Dieu**" (Frantz Casseus)

=== Side four ===
1. "Cucurrucucu Paloma" (Tomás Méndez)
2. "Shenandoah" (Traditional)
3. "Matilda" (Harry Thomas)

The tracks in bold were omitted from the original U.S. RCA CD issue on 1 disc; The complete album was available only on RCA CD releases (on 2 discs) in Germany and Japan, on a 2 CD gold CD issue from Classic Records and a 2 CD hybrid SACD issue from Analogue Productions. The latter hybrid issue featured three previously unreleased tracks: A Spoken Intro, Scarlet Ribbons, and an instrumental Overture Medley.

== Personnel ==
Musicians

- Harry Belafonte – vocals
- Millard Thomas – guitar
- Raphael Boguslav – guitar
- Danny Barrajanos – bongos, conga
- Norman Keenan – bass

Production

- Bob Bollard – producer, liner notes
- Orchestra Conducted by Bob Corman
- Bob Simpson – engineer
- Lee Friedlander – cover photo
- John Gundelfinger – interior illustration

== Charts ==
Chart (1959–60)	Peak position
Italian Albums (HitParadeItalia)	1
Billboard Best Selling Monoraul LP's	1
