= Calypso in Brass =

Studio album by Harry Belafonte
- Released: 1966
- Recorded: 1966
- Genre: Vocal, calypso
- Length: 41:09
- Label: RCA Victor
- Producer: William Eaton, Phil Ramone

Harry Belafonte chronology
In My Quiet Room (1966)	Calypso in Brass (1966)	Belafonte on Campus (1967)

Professional ratings
Review scores
Source	Rating
Allmusic	2/5 stars

Calypso in Brass is an album by Harry Belafonte, released by RCA Victor (LPM-3658 and LSP-3658) in 1966. The album contains new arrangements of previously recorded songs, notably from Calypso and Belafonte Sings of the Caribbean, with a brass ensemble accompaniment. The orchestra was conducted by Howard A. Roberts and arranged by Bob Freedman.

== Chart performance ==
The album peaked at No. 172 on the Billboard Top LPs, during a two-week run on the chart.

== Track listing ==
1. "Jump in the Line" (Raymond Bell) – 4:17
2. "Jump and Bray Medley (Hold 'em Joe and The Jack-Ass Song)" (Hugh Thomas/Irving Burgie, William Attaway) – 4:30
3. "Cocoanut Woman" (Harry Belafonte, Lord Burgess) – 3:17
4. "Tongue Tie Baby" (William Eaton) – 4:07
5. "Zombie Jamboree (Back to Back)" (Conrad Eugene Mauge, Jr.) – 3:14
6. "Sweetheart from Venezuela" (Bob Gordon, Fitzroy Alexander) – 3:57
7. "Man Smart, Woman Smarter" (Norman Span) – 4:49
8. "Reincarnation" (Irving Burgie, Theophilus Philip) – 3:20
9. "Judy Drownded" (Lord Burgess) – 3:07
10. "The Naughty Little Flea" (Norman Thomas) – 3:34
11. "Mama Look a Boo-Boo" (Lord Melody) – 3:07

== Personnel ==
- Harry Belafonte – vocals
- Orchestra conducted by Howard A. Roberts

Production notes:

- Bob Freedman – arrangements
- William Eaton – producer
- Phil Ramone – producer
- William Attaway – liner notes

== Charts ==
Chart (1967)	Peak position
US Billboard Top LPs	172
