= Joan Baez in San Francisco =

Demo album by Joan Baez
- Released: May 1964
- Recorded: June 1958
- Studio: Coast Recorders, San Francisco
- Genre: Folk
- Label: Fantasy
- Producer: Dick Tognazzini

Joan Baez in San Francisco is a demonstration record by Joan Baez which was recorded in 1958, when Baez was seventeen years old. It was released as without permission by Fantasy Records in 1963 and reached # 45 on the Billboard Top 200 Chart, giving Baez 5 albums in the top 50 at the same time. Baez sued to block its distribution and it was withdrawn. It was released by Bear Family Records as "A Package of Joan Baez". Squire Records has also released the album in multiple formats under the title "The Best of Joan Baez."

== Tracking list ==
=== Side A ===
1. "Island in the Sun" (Harry Belafonte, Irving Burgie)
2. "Water Boy" (Traditional)
3. "Annie Had a Baby" (Henry Glover, Lois Mann)
4. "Oh Freedom" (Traditional)
5. "Man Smart, Woman Smarter" (Norman Span, D. L. Miller, F. Kuhn, and Charles Harris)
6. "Scarlet Ribbons" (Evelyn Danzig, Jack Segal)

=== Side B ===
1. "Dark as a Dungeon" (Merle Travis)
2. "Told My Captain" (Traditional)
3. "Young Blood" (Jerry Leiber, Mike Stoller, Doc Pomus)
4. "I Gave My Love a Cherry" (Traditional)
5. "La Bamba" (Traditional)
6. "Every Night" (Traditional)

== Personnel ==
- Joan Baez – acoustic guitar, vocals
- Eirik Wangberg – mixing
