= To Wish You a Merry Christmas =

- Original 1958 LP cover

Studio album by Harry Belafonte
- Released: 1958
- Recorded: 1958
- Genre: Vocal, Christmas
- Length: 45:56
- Label: RCA Victor
- Producer: Ed Welker

Harry Belafonte chronology
Belafonte Sings of the Caribbean (1957)	To Wish You a Merry Christmas (1958)	Belafonte Sings the Blues (1958)

Professional ratings
Review scores
Source	Rating
Allmusic	2/5 stars

To Wish You a Merry Christmas is an album by Harry Belafonte Recorded May 27, 31, June 1, 3 and 8 of 1958 in Hollywood. Conducted by Bob Corman. Millard Thomas and Laurindo Almeida, guitarists. Produced and directed by Ed Welker.

== Track listing ==
=== Original LP ===
To Wish You a Merry Christmas was originally released in 1958 as RCA Victor catalog number LPM/LSP-1887.
Side 1:

1. "A Star in the East" - 4:15
2. "The Gifts They Gave" - 3:58
3. "The Son of Mary" - 3:21
4. "The Twelve Days of Christmas" - 3:49
5. "Where the Little Jesus Sleeps" - 2:05
6. "Medley: The Joys of Christmas; Oh Little Town of Bethlehem; Deck the Halls; The First Noël" - 5:25

Side 2:

1. "Mary, Mary" - 3:21
2. "Jehova the Lord Will Provide" - 2:57
3. "Silent Night" - 3:35
4. "Christmas Is Coming" - 1:38
5. "Medley: We Wish You a Merry Christmas; God Rest Ye Merry, Gentlemen; O Come All Ye Faithful; Joy to the World" - 4:29
6. "I Heard the Bells on Christmas Day" - 3:03

=== Re-release 1 ===
The album was repackaged in 1962 as RCA Victor catalog number LPM/LSP-2626, with a different cover (with Belafonte's picture this time) and adding the song "Mary's Boy Child" (from An Evening with Belafonte) to Side 2. The credits are also slightly different, listing conductor Bob Corman as Robert De Cormier.
Side 1: identical to the 1958 release.
Side 2:

1. "Mary's Boy Child" - 4:20
2. "Silent Night" - 3:35
3. "Christmas Is Coming" - 2:56
4. "Mary, Mary" - 3:34
5. "Jehova the Lord Will Provide" - 2:57
6. "Medley: We Wish You a Merry Christmas; God Rest Ye Merry, Gentlemen; O Come All Ye Faithful; Joy to the World" - 4:26
7. "I Heard the Bells on Christmas Day" - 3:01

=== Re-release 2 ===
In 1976, the songs were repackaged again, under the title Belafonte's Christmas, from RCA Records Canada, catalog number KNLI-0166 . The tracks are identical to the 1962 release, except that sides 1 and 2 have been switched (i.e. the first song of the album is now "Mary's Boy Child"). A completely different picture of Belafonte is used on the cover.

=== Re-release 3 ===
In 2001, RCA reissued the album on CD as Harry Belafonte Christmas, with five bonus tracks added:

1. "Goin' Down Jordan" - 3:53
2. "Amen" - 3:06
3. "Glory Manger" - 4:39
4. "The Baby Boy" - 3:25
5. "Scarlet Ribbons (For Her Hair)" - 2:45

== Personnel ==
- Laurindo Almeida Guitar
- Dick Baxter Digital Engineer, Engineer
- Harry Belafonte Primary Artist, Vocals
- C.C. Carter Composer
- Frantz Casseus Guitar
- Corman Adaptation
- Gene Corman Composer
- Chick Crumpacker Digital Producer
- Robert De Cormier Adaptation, Choir Director, Composer, Conductor
- Dennis Farnon Producer
- Franz Gruber Composer
- Jester Hairston Composer
- Henry Wadsworth Longfellow Composer
- Johnny Marks Adaptation, Composer
- Milton Okun Composer
- The Orchestra Unknown Contributor Role
- Henri René Producer
- Millard Thomas Guitar
- Traditional Composer
- Don Wardell Digital Series Coordination
- Ed Welker Producer
- Watson Wylie Liner Notes
