= Listen to the Man (disambiguation) =

Listen to the Man is a song by George Ezra

- Listen to the Man, live album from Harry Belafonte discography
- "Listen to the Man", single by The Troggs 1973
