= List of Billboard number-one albums of 1956 =

These are the Billboard magazine number-one albums of 1956. These albums were the number-one albums on the Best-Selling Popular Record Albums chart. On March 24, 1956, the name of the chart was changed to Best-Selling Popular Albums. On July 7, 1956, the name was changed again to Best-Selling Pop Albums.

== Chart history ==
Key
†	Indicates best performing album of 1956

Issue date	Album	Artist(s)	Label	Ref.
January 7	No album chart			
January 14	No album chart			
January 21	No album chart			
January 28	Oklahoma!	Soundtrack	Capitol	
February 4	No album chart			
February 11	No album chart			
February 18	No album chart			
February 25	Oklahoma!	Soundtrack	Capitol	
March 3	No album chart			
March 10	No album chart			
March 17	No album chart			
March 24	Belafonte	Harry Belafonte	RCA Victor	
March 31	Belafonte	Harry Belafonte	RCA Victor	
April 7	Belafonte	Harry Belafonte	RCA Victor	
April 14	Belafonte	Harry Belafonte	RCA Victor	
April 21	Belafonte	Harry Belafonte	RCA Victor	
April 28	Belafonte	Harry Belafonte	RCA Victor	
May 5	Elvis Presley	Elvis Presley	RCA Victor	
May 12	Elvis Presley	Elvis Presley	RCA Victor	
May 19	Elvis Presley	Elvis Presley	RCA Victor	
May 26	Elvis Presley	Elvis Presley	RCA Victor	
June 2	Elvis Presley	Elvis Presley	RCA Victor	
June 9	Elvis Presley	Elvis Presley	RCA Victor	
June 16	Elvis Presley	Elvis Presley	RCA Victor	
June 23	Elvis Presley	Elvis Presley	RCA Victor	
June 30	Elvis Presley	Elvis Presley	RCA Victor	
July 7	Elvis Presley	Elvis Presley	RCA Victor	
July 14	My Fair Lady	Original Broadway Cast	Columbia	
July 21	My Fair Lady	Original Broadway Cast	Columbia	
July 28	My Fair Lady	Original Broadway Cast	Columbia	
August 4	My Fair Lady	Original Broadway Cast	Columbia	
August 11	My Fair Lady	Original Broadway Cast	Columbia	
August 18	My Fair Lady	Original Broadway Cast	Columbia	
August 25	My Fair Lady	Original Broadway Cast	Columbia	
September 1	My Fair Lady	Original Broadway Cast	Columbia	
September 8	Calypso †	Harry Belafonte	RCA Victor	
September 15	Calypso †	Harry Belafonte	RCA Victor	
September 22	Calypso †	Harry Belafonte	RCA Victor	
September 29	Calypso †	Harry Belafonte	RCA Victor	
October 6	The King and I	Soundtrack	Capitol	
October 13	The Eddy Duchin Story	Carmen Cavallaro / Soundtrack	Decca	
October 20	Calypso †	Harry Belafonte	RCA Victor	
October 27	Calypso †	Harry Belafonte	RCA Victor	
November 3	Calypso †	Harry Belafonte	RCA Victor	
November 10	Calypso †	Harry Belafonte	RCA Victor	
November 17	Calypso †	Harry Belafonte	RCA Victor	
November 24	Calypso †	Harry Belafonte	RCA Victor	
December 1	Calypso †	Harry Belafonte	RCA Victor	
December 8	Elvis	Elvis Presley	RCA Victor	
December 15	Elvis	Elvis Presley	RCA Victor	
December 22	Elvis	Elvis Presley	RCA Victor	
December 29	Elvis	Elvis Presley	RCA Victor	

== See also ==
- 1956 in music
- List of number-one albums (United States)
