= Paul Ackerman =

American music journalist (1908–1977)

- Born: February 18, 1908; New York City, New York
- Died: December 31, 1977 (aged 69); Neponsit, Queens, New York
- Education: College of William and Mary; Columbia University
- Occupations: Music journalist; music editor
- Years active: fl. 1940s–1973
- Employer: Billboard
- Known for: Music journalism
- Awards: Rock and Roll Hall of Fame

Paul Ackerman (February 18, 1908–December 31, 1977) was an American music journalist best known for his tenure as music editor of American publication Billboard.

Born in 1908 in New York City, New York, Ackerman graduated from the College of William and Mary in Williamsburg, Virginia, later going on to achieve a master's degree in English literature at Columbia University.

Ackerman worked as Billboard's music editor from 1943 until his retirement in 1973, after previously working with them as a reporter. He died in 1977, aged 69, at his residence in Neponsit, Queens. Ackerman was posthumously inducted into the Rock and Roll Hall of Fame in 1995.

== Early life and education ==
Ackerman was born on February 18, 1908, New York City, New York, to his parents and two siblings; Evelyn and Martin. He graduated from the College of William and Mary in Williamsburg, Virginia before later going on to achieve his master's degree in English literature at Columbia University, New York.

== Career ==
Ackerman began working at American music publication Billboard as a reporter prior to 1943. Upon returning in 1943, he was named as the magazine's music editor, remaining in that role until his retirement.

He was credited as the author of the liner notes for Harry Belafonte's eighth studio album, Love Is a Gentle Thing (1959).

Ackerman went on to become executive director of the Songwriters Hall of Fame; in 1970, he was appointed to select which country music were to be included in the music library presented by the Recording Industry Association of America (RIAA) to the White House. He was made an honorary member of Memphis Music Inc. Ackerman retired from Billboard in 1973.

== Death ==
Ackerman died aged 69 on December 31, 1977, at his home in Neponsit, Queens, New York.

== Legacy ==
Ackerman was among the first journalists to write on the newly created rock and roll genre. He was a scholar knowledgeable in European and American civilization. His work focused on popular music of all genres. Ackerman enjoyed "rural blues and country idioms".

== Awards and honors ==
Ackerman received a number of awards as a music journalist and scholar. In 1995, he was inducted into the Rock and Roll Hall of Fame, in the non-performer category.

== Bibliography ==
- Stambler, Irwin; Grelun, Landon. (1969) The Encyclopedia of Folk, Country & Western Music, 1st ed., p. 3-4, (no ISBN) Amazon ASIN: B000RC4F16, LC: 67-10659.
- Shemel, Sidney; M. William Krasilovsky. Editor: Ackerman, Paul. (1964), ["This Business of Music"], (no ISBN) Amazon ASIN: B002KF9MLQ, LC: 64-25859.
