= Jamaican folk music =

Genre of music originating in Jamaica

A notable year in the history of Jamaican music was 1907, when Walter Jekyll's Jamaican Song and Story was first published. The contents of this book include four parts entitled "Anancy Stories", "Digging Sings", "Ring Tunes", and "Dancing Tunes". Each part has an introduction, songs, stories, and melodies.

== Part 1: Anancy stories ==
Includes 51 items, such as the story and melody "Leah and Tiger" (item 36, pages 108–9). The heading refers to a legendary figure, Anancy, or Anansi, the Ashanti word for "spider" and the name of a folktale character. Anancy stories and certain musical characteristics originated in West Africa.

== Part 2: Digging sings ==
Includes 37 items, such as "The one shirt I have" (item 58, page 164). The heading refers to the digging of holes for the planting of yams. "Nothing more joyous can be imagined," writes Jekyll, "than a good 'digging-sing' from twenty throats, with the pickers—so they call their pickaxes—falling in regular beat." Digging sings included songs sung during many kinds of labour. A feature of several digging sings is the bobbin. Jekyll explains, "One man starts or 'raises' the tune and the others come in with the 'bobbin,' the short refrain..." In the song "Miss Nancy Ray", for example, the bobbin is: "Oh hurrah, boys!" Bobbins resemble and perhaps stemmed from a common manner of singing of work songs in Africa.

== Part 3: Ring tunes ==
Includes 28 items, such as "Ring a number " (item 92, page 194). These tunes were sung by boys and girls holding hands to form a ring.

== Part 4: Dancing tunes ==
Includes 80 items, such as "Fan me, soldierman" (item 125, page 223), and Carry me Ackee go Linstead market" (item 121, pages 219–220).

During the 1970s, Oxford University Press published six collections of Jamaican folks songs arranged and annotated by Dr. Olive Lewin. Her book, Rock It Come Over: the Folk Music of Jamaica, describes Jekyll's 1907 book as "very well researched," but she gives examples of occasional errors. She concludes that "although Jekyll's interest extended beyond music to Jamaican folklore, it was by his considerable knowledge as a musician that he made the most valuable contribution to this all too neglected field of scholarship."

In her book Forty Folk Songs of Jamaica, Lewin classifies the songs into 11 groups: Bruckins, Jankunnu, Kumina, Maroon, Mento, Nagos, Rasta (Rastafarian), Revival, (Set-Up; Gerreh), Tambo, and Worksongs. Of these, mento is by far the most common. However, much of mento is of relatively recent origin and should be classified as popular music rather than folk. Linkages from folk music to mento are described in Daniel T. Neely's dissertation, Mento, Jamaica's Original Music: Development, Tourism and the Nationalist Frame (New York University, 2007).

Among the best known Jamaican folk songs are "Day-O (Banana Boat Song)", "Jamaica Farewell" (Iron Bar), and "Linstead Market". The first two of these were popularized by Harry Belafonte. The third has come a long way since its appearance among Jekyll's 108 Jamaican folk songs. Not only has "Linstead Market" been arranged for solo voice and piano and for performance by choirs, but also, it was arranged for congregational singing in 1975 and now appears in at least five hymnals.
