= Love Is a Gentle Thing =

Studio album by Harry Belafonte
- Released: 1959
- Recorded: 1958
- Genre: Vocal
- Length: 41:36
- Label: RCA Victor
- Producer: Ed Welker

Harry Belafonte chronology
| Belafonte Sings the Blues (1958) | Love Is a Gentle Thing (1959) | Belafonte at Carnegie Hall (1959) |

Professional ratings
Review scores
| Source | Rating |
|---|---|
| Allmusic | 2.5/5 stars |

Love Is a Gentle Thing is an album by Harry Belafonte, released by RCA Victor in 1959. It was recorded with arranger / conductors Alan Greene and Bob Corman.

== Chart performance ==
The album peaked at No. 18 on the Billboard Best-Selling Monophonic Albums chart, during a thirteen-week run on it.

== Reception ==
Billboard magazine chose Love Is a Gentle Thing as one of their "Spotlight Winners of the Week" in March 1959, and wrote that "Belafonte displays his usual tender, feelingful vocal style on a group of expressive folk themes with varying moods...Striking cover".

Cary Ginell on All Music writes "Of the tunes included in the album, the best of which are the Weavers' Lee Hays' 'Times Are Gettin' Hard" and John Jacob Niles' 'Go 'Way From My Window.' But the lack of variety makes this album somewhat of a bore when compared to some of the more exciting Belafonte product of the 50s and early 60s."

== Track listing ==
=== Side one ===
1. "Fifteen" (Alan Greene, Robert Nemeroff) – 2:50
2. "I Never Will Marry" (Fred Brooks) – 2:44
3. "I'm Goin' Away" (Alan Greene) – 3:08
4. "Small One" (Lewis Allan, Alan Greene) – 2:53
5. "Bella Rosa" (Lord Burgess) – 3:25
6. "All My Trials" (Rita Greene, C. C. Carter) – 4:37

=== Side two ===
1. "Green Grow the Lilacs" (Fred Brooks) – 3:55
2. "Times are Gettin' Hard" (Lee Hays) – 3:36
3. "Turn Around" (Malvina Reynolds, Alan Greene) – 2:23
4. "Go Away from My Window" (John Jacob Niles) – 3:09
5. "Delia's Gone" (Bob Corman, Milt Okun)– 4:34
6. "Walkin' on the Green Grass" (Fred Brooks) – 3:22

== Personnel ==
- Harry Belafonte – vocals
- Bob Corman – arranger, conductor ("I Never Will Marry", "Bella Rosa", "All My Trials", "Green Grow the Lilacs", "Times are Gettin' Hard", "Delia's Gone", "Walkin' on the Green Grass")
- Alan Greene – arranger, conductor ("Fifteen", "I'm Goin' Away", "Small One", "Turn Around", "Go Away From My Window")
- Produced by Edward Welker
- Cover Art by David Stone Martin
- Liner-notes by Paul Ackerman

== Charts ==
Chart peaks for Love Is a Gentle Thing
| Chart (1959) | Peak position |
|---|---|
| US Billboard Best-Selling Monophonic Albums | 18 |
