= Belafonte Sings of the Caribbean =

Studio album by Harry Belafonte
- Released: August 16 1957
- Recorded: January 27, 1957
- Venues: Webster Hall, New York City
- Genre: Calypso
- Length: 35:52
- Label: RCA Victor
- Producer: Joe Carlton

Harry Belafonte chronology
| An Evening with Belafonte (1957) | Belafonte Sings of the Caribbean (1957) | To Wish You a Merry Christmas (1958) |

Professional ratings
Review scores
| Source | Rating |
|---|---|
| Allmusic | link |

Belafonte Sings of the Caribbean is an album by Harry Belafonte, released by RCA Victor (LPM-1505) in 1957.

It followed his album of calypso music, Calypso (1956), which was a major commercial success in the United States, spending over half a year atop the Billboard Top Pop Albums chart. Although Sings of the Caribbean was less successful, only reaching number 17 on the chart, it nevertheless "consolidated the vogue for calypso". According to Cary Ginell of AllMusic, Belfatone Sings of the Caribbean, being the singer's second set of songs from the West Indies, "expanded the scope in both style as well as geography from the Calypso album", additionally noting the addition of orchestral arrangements.

== Track listing ==
=== Side one ===
1. "Scratch, Scratch" (Harry Belafonte, Lord Burgess) – 2:39
2. "Lucy's Door" (Traditional, Lord Burgess) – 3:43
3. "Cordelia Brown" (Lord Burgess, Belafonte) – 2:53
4. "Don't Ever Love Me" (Burgie) – 2:46
5. "Love, Love Alone" (John Hardy) – 3:19
6. "Coconut Woman" (Lord Burgess, Belafonte) – 3:18

=== Side two ===
1. "Haïti Chérie" (Lord Burgess, Belafonte) – 3:18
2. "Judy Drownded" (Burgie) – 3:28
3. "Island in the Sun" (Lord Burgess, Belafonte) – 3:21
4. "Angelique-O" (Burgie, William Attaway) – 2:40
5. "Lead Man Holler" (Lord Burgess, Belafonte) – 4:18

== Personnel ==
- Harry Belafonte – vocals
- Millard Thomas – guitar
- Frantz Casseus – guitar
- Victor Messer – guitar

Production notes:

- Joe Carlton – producer
- Bob Corman – orchestra and chorus
- D. C. Gunn – cover photo
- William Attaway – liner notes
