= Lolita Cuevas =

Puerto Rican singer and actress

- Born: May 30, 1930; Mayagüez, Puerto Rico
- Died: September 5, 1994 (aged 64); Hato Rey, Puerto Rico

Lolita Cuevas (1930–1994) was a Puerto Rican-born singer and actress. Her work as a vocalist was based on a compendium of Caribbean songs, and her interpretations of them are considered a fundamental piece in the historiography of Haitian music.

== Biography ==
Lolita Cuevas was born in Mayagüez, Puerto Rico in 1930. Her family moved to Haiti when she was two, where she then spent her childhood.

At the age of fifteen she gave her first concert as a professional singer in Port-au-Prince. From there her career took off, and she frequently sang for the radio and concerts around the Caribbean, Latin America, and the United States.

In 1941 her interpretation of La Borinqueña became popular in Puerto Rico, and she recorded versions of "In My Old San Juan" in French and Creole.

In 1953 she recorded the album "Haitian Folk Songs" with guitarist and arranger Frantz Casseus.

She died on September 5, 1994 at Auxilio Mutuo Hospital in Hato Rey, Puerto Rico the age of 64.
