= Lena & Michel =

Studio album by Lena Horne
- Released: 1975
- Recorded: February 1975
- Genre: Pop
- Length: 41:07
- Label: RCA Victor
- Producer: Michel Legrand, Norman Schwartz, Nat Shapiro

Lena Horne chronology
Nature's Baby (1971)	Lena & Michel (1975)	Lena: A New Album (1976)

Professional ratings
Review scores
Source	Rating
Allmusic	0/5 stars

Lena & Michel is a 1975 album by Lena Horne, arranged by Michel Legrand. This album was recorded at the RCA Studios, New York in February 1975. Re-issued on CD in 2002 by BMG Japan and in 2010 by Sony UK.

== Track listing ==
1. "I Will Wait for You (Je Ne Pourrai Jamais Vivre Sans Toi)" (Jacques Demy, Norman Gimbel, Michel Legrand) – 3:47
2. "I Got a Name" (Charles Fox, Gimbel) – 3:52
3. "Nobody Knows" (Alan and Marilyn Bergman, Legrand) – 3:39
4. "Being a Woman" (Larry Grossman, Hal Hackaday) – 3:22
5. "Let Me Be Your Mirror" (Hal David, Legrand) – 2:18
6. "Loneliness" (Kenny Ascher, Paul Williams) – 3:50
7. "Time in a Bottle" (Jim Croce) – 3:48
8. "Everything That Happens to You, Happens to Me" (David, Legrand) – 2:53
9. "Sad Song" (Ascher, Williams) – 4:02
10. "I've Been Starting Tomorrow All of My Life" (David, Legrand) – 2:22
11. "Thank You Love" (Robert Freedman) – 3:58
12. "One at a Time" (Alan and Marilyn Bergman) – 3:16

== Personnel ==
=== Performance ===
- Lena Horne - vocals
- The Howard Roberts Chorale - vocals
- Michel Legrand - Arranger
- Richard Tee - Organ
- Paul Griffin - Piano
- Joe Beck, Cornell Dupree - Guitar
- Ron Carter - Bass
- Grady Tate - drums
- Ralph MacDonald - percussion
- Alan Rubin, Joe Newman, Jon Faddis, Marvin Stamm, Thad Jones - trumpet
- David Nadien, Max Pollikoff, Paul Gershman, Sanford Allen - violin
- Seymour Barab - cello
- Phil Bodner - oboe
- Ray Beckenstein - flute
- Emile Charlap - contractor
- Mike Moran - engineer
- Harold Wheeler, Sherman Sneed - associate producers
