= An Evening with Belafonte =

Studio album by Harry Belafonte
- Released: 1957
- Recorded: February 15 – December 4, 1956
- Studio: Radio Recorders, Hollywood
- Genre: Vocal
- Label: RCA Victor
- Producer: Henri René, Dennis Farnon, E. O. Welker

Harry Belafonte chronology
Calypso (1956)	An Evening with Belafonte (1957)	Belafonte Sings of the Caribbean (1957)

Professional ratings
Review scores
Source	Rating
Allmusic	4/5 stars

An Evening with Belafonte is a studio album by Harry Belafonte, released by RCA Victor in 1957. The album peaked at No. 2 during a twenty-week run on Billboard's Top Pop Albums. In 1976, the album was reissued in the mid-priced RCA "Pure Gold" album series, with new cover art under new catalog number ANL1-1434(e).

== Track listing ==
1. "Merci Bon Dieu" (Frantz Casseus) – 2:54
2. "Once Was" (Kennedy, Lorin) – 4:44
3. "Hava Nageela" (traditional) – 3:14
4. "Danny Boy" (Frederic Weatherly) – 5:48
5. "The Drummer and the Cook" (Paul Campbell) – 3:55
6. "Come O My Love" (traditional) – 4:23
7. "Shenandoah" (traditional) – 3:45
8. "Mary's Boy Child" (Jester Hairston) – 4:19
9. "Cu Cu Ru Cu Cu Paloma" (Tomás Méndez) – 5:28
10. "Eden Was Just Like This" (Kennedy, Lord Burgess) – 2:58
11. "When the Saints Go Marching In" (traditional) – 3:39

== Personnel ==
- Harry Belafonte – vocals
- Millard Thomas – guitar
- Frantz Casseus – guitar
- Harry Sweets Edison – trumpet
- Si Zentner – trombone
- Will Lorin and His Orchestra

Production notes:

- Henri René – producer
- Dennis Farnon – producer
- E. O. Welker – producer
- John S. Wilson – liner notes

== Charts ==
Chart (1956)	Peak position
US Billboard Top Pop Albums	2
