= Belafonte (album) =

Studio album by Harry Belafonte
- Released: February 1956
- Recorded: August 10 – 19, 1955
- Studio: RCA Victor 24th Street and Manhattan Center, New York City
- Genre: Vocal, calypso
- Label: RCA Victor
- Producer: Henri René

Harry Belafonte chronology
Mark Twain and Other Folk Favorites (1954)	Belafonte (1956)	Calypso (1956)

Professional ratings
Review scores
Source	Rating
Allmusic	link

Belafonte is the second studio album by American recording artist Harry Belafonte, released by RCA Victor in February 1956. The album was the first number one on the Billboard Top Pop Albums chart, topping the chart for six weeks before being knocked out of the top spot by Elvis Presley's self-titled debut album, also issued by RCA Victor.

== Track listing ==
1. "Waterboy" (Avery Robinson) – 3:42
2. "Troubles" (Harry Belafonte) – 3:38
3. "Suzanne" (Belafonte, Millard Thomas) – 3:19
4. "Matilda" (Norman Span) – 3:11
5. "Take My Mother Home" (Hall Johnson) – 6:00
6. "Noah" (Belafonte, William Attaway) – 4:53
7. "Scarlet Ribbons" (Jack Segal, Evelyn Danzig) – 3:13
8. "In That Great Gettin' Up Mornin'" (Norman Luboff, Belafonte) – 3:15
9. "Unchained Melody" (Hy Zaret, Alex North) – 3:18
10. "Jump Down, Spin Around" (Luboff, Belafonte, Attaway) – 1:54
11. "Sylvie" (Huddie Ledbetter, Paul Campbell) – 5:21

== Personnel ==
- Harry Belafonte – vocals
- Millard Thomas – guitar
- Bud Shank – saxophone
- Jimmy Giuffre – saxophone
- Buddy Childers – trumpet
- Conte Candoli – trumpet
- Maynard Ferguson – trumpet
- Tony Scott's Orchestra
- The Norman Luboff Choir

== See also ==
- List of Billboard number-one albums of 1956

== Charts ==
Chart (1955)	Peak position
US Billboard Top Pop Albums	1
