= Emile Straker =

Barbadian musician (1936–2026)

Sir Emile Straker KA CBE
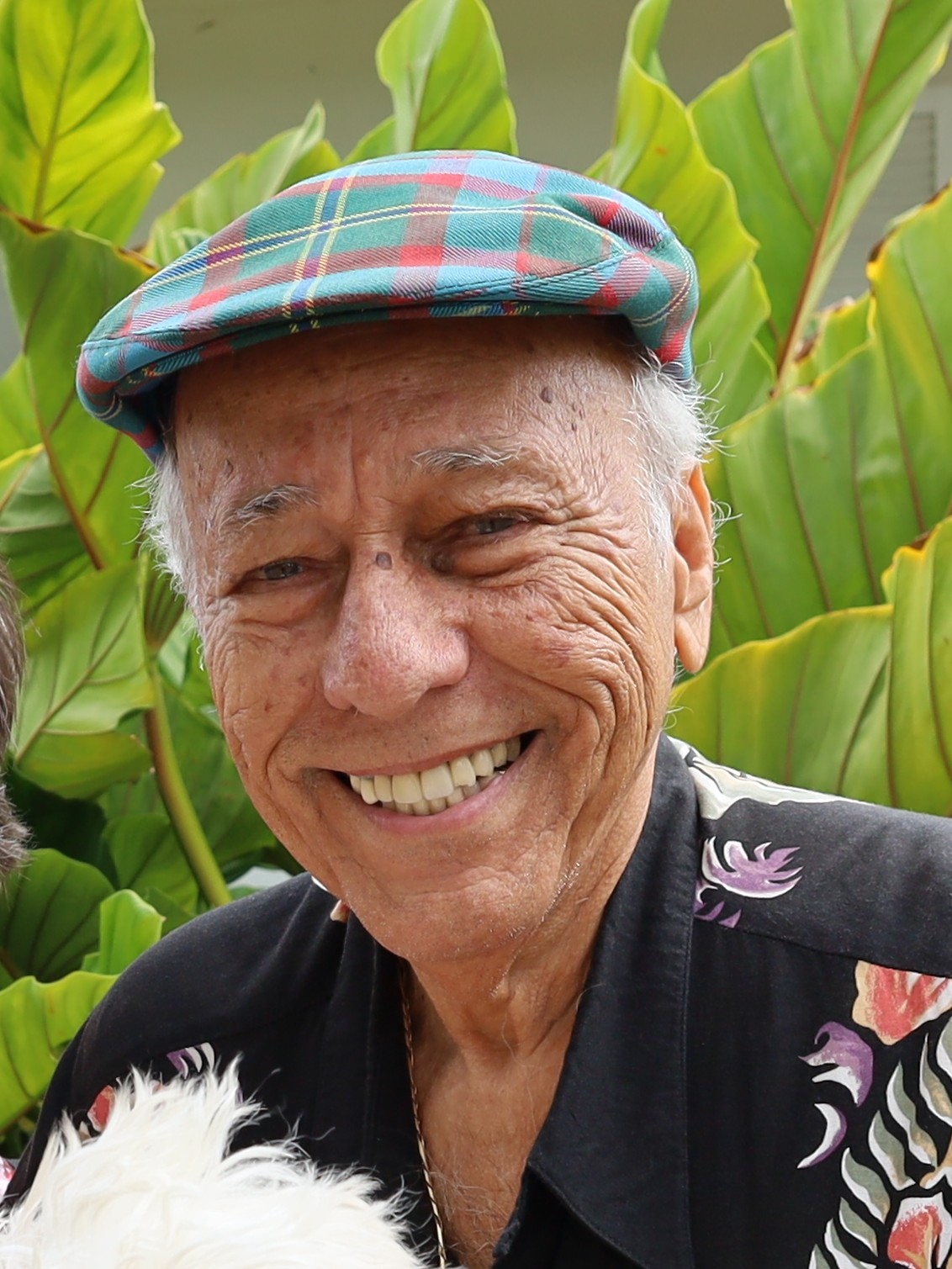
- Born: Charles Emil Straker; 31 March 1936; Bridgetown, Barbados
- Died: 19 June 2026 (aged 90)
- Spouse: Joyce Johnson (1961–2021, her death)

Sir Charles Emile Straker (31 March 1936 – 19 June 2026) was a Barbadian musician and songwriter and a onetime lead singer of the Calypso group, The Merrymen. In 2000, Straker was one of 100 Barbadians awarded a Barbados Centennial Honour. He was made a Commander of the Order of the British Empire in the 2013 New Year's Honours and, in 2019, he was made a Knight of the Order of St Andrew.

== Early life and education ==
Straker was born in Bridgetown, Barbados on 31 March 1936. He grew up in Queen’s Park and attended Harrison College. When he was 20, he joined the Purina Boys Steel Band.

Soon afterward, Straker moved to Canada. In Montreal, he studied commercial art. He also played with a group called the Calypso Bandits, with three Trinidadians.

== Career ==
Straker returned to Barbados and, in 1963, he co-founded the five-piece calypso group, The Merrymen. Straker was the band's lead singer and songwriter.

In the mid-1960s, the band signed with EMI and released the albums, Sam Lord and Wings of a Dove. The band made a total of 40 albums, some of which were recorded at Abbey Road Studios in London, England.

The group played around the world including in Bermuda at the Tennis Stadium on 16 April 1966, in London at Royal Festival Hall and Royal Albert Hall, in Toronto at the Skydome, in the United States at Carnegie Hall and Madison Square Garden, and in the Netherlands. In 1979, The Merrymen played the halftime show at Superbowl XIII.

Of Straker, one of his other band members, Robin Hunte, said "in the 30 years The Merrymen had played, he never knew what song Emile Straker would play once they got on the platform. The rest of the band just... fell into sync after Straker played the first notes."

The band broke up temporarily in 2013.

== Personal life and death ==
Joyce and Emile Straker at their home, "The Hope" in April, 2012.

Straker married Joyce Irene Johnson on 18 November 1961. The couple had three children. His wife died in 2021.

In 2023, Straker published his autobiography, "My Island and Me".

Until his death in 2026, Straker lived in Barbados with late-stage dementia. Straker died on the morning of 19 June 2026, at the age of 90.

== Awards and honours ==
Straker was awarded an honorary doctorate in law from the University of the West Indies. The orator described him as "a legend from the world of Barbadian music, a man whose unforgettable songs have formed a soundtrack to our lives for nearly fifty years, a man who has done more than anyone else to bring the very best of Caribbean folk arts and culture to a global audience".

Straker was awarded the Barbados Service Star in 1981, the Pride of Barbados Award in 1998, the Barbados Centennial Honour in 2000, and the National Award of Excellence in 2010.

In 2012, Straker was made a Commander of the Order of the British Empire in the 2013 New Year's Honours.

In 2015, he was recognised as a living musical legend at the Caribbean Muzik Festival along with Jimmy Cliff, Hugh Masakela, McCartha Sandy-Lewis, Omara Portoundo and Ronnie Butler.

In 2019, Straker was knighted at a ceremony at the Kensington Oval in Barbados by the Governor-General of Barbados, Dame Sandra Mason.
