= Nature's Baby =

Studio album by Lena Horne
- Released: 1971
- Recorded: 1971
- Studio: Electric Lady Studios, New York City
- Genre: Pop
- Length: 44:07
- Label: Buddah
- Producer: Ray Ellis

Lena Horne chronology
Harry & Lena (1970)	Nature's Baby (1971)	Lena & Michel (1975)

Nature's Baby is a 1971 studio album by Lena Horne, arranged by Ray Ellis.

== Track listing ==
1. "Feels So Good" (Ralph MacDonald, William Salter) – 2:58
2. "A Song for You" (Leon Russell) – 4:16
3. "Maybe I'm Amazed" (Paul McCartney) – 3:37
4. "Bein' Green" (Joe Raposo) – 3:24
5. "Your Song" (Elton John, Bernie Taupin) – 3:55
6. "Mother Time" (Gene McDaniels) – 4:59
7. "I Wouldn't Have You Any Other Way (Ain't Nobody Perfect)" (Goade, Wheeler) – 2:47
8. "Only the Moon and Me" (N. Calloway, Roberts) – 4:50
9. "More Today Than Yesterday" (Pat Upton) – 3:46
10. "Think About Your Troubles" (Harry Nilsson) – 3:00
11. "Nature's Baby" (McDaniels) – 6:35

== Personnel ==
=== Performance ===
- Lena Horne – vocals
- William Easton – assistant producer
- Bob Cato – photography, art direction
