= Blood on the Forge =

1941 novel by William Attaway

- First edition cover
- Author: William Attaway
- Language: English
- Genre: Novel, Proletarian literature
- Publisher: Doubleday, Doran
- Publication date: 1941
- Publication place: United States
- Media type: Print (hardback)
- Pages: 279
- OCLC: 5284808
- Preceded by: Let Me Breathe Thunder

Blood on the Forge is a migration novel by the African-American writer William Attaway set in the steel valley of Pittsburgh, Pennsylvania, during 1919, a time when vast numbers of Black Americans moved northward. Attaway's own family was part of this population shift from South to North when he was a child.

His novel follows the Moss brothers as they escape the inequality of sharecropping in the South only to encounter inequality in the mills of the North. Their story illustrates the tragedy and hardships many Black Americans faced during the Great Migration. Blood on the Forge touches on themes such as the destruction of nature, the emptiness and hunger that the working characters experience, the complications of the individual in a depersonalized world, and the myth of the American Dream.

== Background ==
During his childhood in the 1910s, author William Attaway traveled with his family from the segregated south of Mississippi to the northern city of Chicago; in doing so his family became part of what would be known as the Great Migration. From 1910 to 1930, approximately six million African Americans moved from the rural southern United States to the industrialized North. The northern states of Illinois, Ohio, Indiana, New York and Michigan received the majority of the migrating African Americans. Factors motivating blacks to migrate north included the plentiful job opportunities in Northern industry, and the desire to escape the harsh racial climate of the South. As a result, neighborhoods in Northern cities saw drastic changes in population and an increase in issues concerning housing. Many cultural movements were spawned due to the large influx in black populations in the North, including the Harlem Renaissance and the spread of jazz music.

== Plot summary ==
Part One

The novel opens in Kentucky, in the year 1919; sharecropping half-brothers Big Mat, Chinatown, and Melody Moss are in dire straits. After their mule dragged their mother to her death, Big Mat killed the animal in a fit of rage. Now without a mule, the brothers are unable to work their land, and are likely to starve. The landowner, Mr. Johnston, agrees to give the brothers another mule.

When Big Mat goes to Mr. Johnston's riding boss to collect the mule he had been promised, the riding boss refuses to give him the mule, and makes a racist comment about the departed Mrs. Moss. Big Mat's anger again overcomes him and he attacks and possibly kills the riding boss. Earlier that day, Chinatown and Melody are visited by a white man on horseback who gives them a ten-dollar bill, promising much more if the brothers leave that night on a train that would take them North, to work. When Big Mat returns that evening and Melody and Chinatown tell him what the stranger said, Big Mat decides that he and his brothers will head North that very evening.

Part Two

Part Two, the shortest of the novel, chronicles the inhumane conditions of the train in which the Moss brothers are shipped north to Pennsylvania.

Part Three

The Moss brothers arrive at a mill town near Pittsburgh, where they get work in the steel mill and live together in a bunkhouse with the other workers of the mill. On their time off, Chinatown and Melody go to a Mexican madam named Sugar Mama, where they meet her niece Anna, whom Melody becomes infatuated with.

Chinatown and Melody convince Big Mat to come with them to a dog fight. When Anna rushes into the ring to prevent the death of one of the dogs, she is hit by the dog's owner. Big Mat responds by punching the man, which leads to a riot. After the fight breaks up, Anna rushes up to Big Mat and kisses him before running away again.

Big Mat takes Anna away from Sugar Mamma and sets up house with her in a small shack. Melody brings a letter from Big Mat's wife Hattie to the shack only to find Anna there alone. When he tells Anna about the letter she tries to snatch it from him; the two wrestle over the letter. The struggle culminates in Melody raping Anna.

There is a catastrophic accident at the mill that kills 14 men and blinds Chinatown. After this tragedy, the labor union becomes very active and gains many new members. The atmosphere of the town becomes increasingly hostile as the foreign mill workers come to resent the African American workers, who are the only group that refuse to join the union.

Big Mat is recruited by the sheriff, who is impressed with Big Mat's strength, to be a deputy and help combat the growing union. Once deputized, Mat is told that he is a boss in the town; after a lifetime of oppression, this new feeling of authority goes to Big Mat's head.

Melody decides to cheer Chinatown up after his accident by taking him to visit some prostitutes. Once at the brothel, Melody finds out that Anna has been working there. Melody returns home and tries to convince Anna to run away with him. When Big Mat overhears them, he once again is overpowered by his rage and beats Anna with his brass-studded belt.

Later that night Big Mat, along with the sheriff and his deputies, raid the union headquarters. In the midst of the action, Big Mat is repeatedly hit on the back of the head with a pickaxe handle by a young Slavic union member. Big Mat is killed by the blows.

The book ends with Melody and Chinatown leaving the mill town as they take a train to Pittsburgh, where they plan to rebuild their lives.

== Genre ==
=== Proletarian literature ===
Blood on the Forge is an example of proletarian literature, a genre whose works usually represented the years surrounding the Great Depression. The experience of the characters in the novel mirror the class struggles during the Great Migration, specifically the hardships of African American workers during this period. The Moss brothers are realistically depicted as "emerging black proletariat."

=== Migration narrative ===
Attaway's novel is also a migration narrative, as it traces the journey of African American brothers from Southern farm life to the industrial North. Lawrence R. Rodgers states that there are four kinds of migration narratives, the Early Migration Novel, the Harlem Renaissance, the Fugitive Migration Novel, and finally the Communal Migrant Novel, which is post-Depression. Blood on the Forge would be considered an Early Migration Novel, as it takes place during the early 20th century and because of its industrial subject matter. Rodgers explains that Harlem Renaissance works do not discuss the actual migration, only what came of it, and in her review of Rodgers' Canaan Bound: The African-American Great Migration Novel, Farrah Jasmine Griffin states, "If the Harlem Renaissance writers failed to make the most of the migration novel form, the generation that followed—fueled by the depression economy, personal deprivation, and a strong sense of displacement—put migration at the center, not the periphery, of its artistic imagination." In particular, Chicago writers such as Attaway were responding to the failures of Harlem Renaissance writers to express the first wave of African American migration.

One important aspect of the migration narrative is its emphasis on the differences between the traditional (or folk) and the modern. Migration narratives typically include references to ancestors and strangers, with ancestors being linked to the South and strangers to the North. In Blood on the Forge, the immigrants the Moss brothers work with in the mills would be considered strangers. Ancestors are also linked with folklore and tradition, such as music and food. Melody tries to keep the brother's heritage alive with his guitar. Each brother experiences his own shift from the folk to the industrial that is characteristic of the Great Migration. Melody changes the way he plays the guitar from slicking the chords, as he did at home, to picking them. Chinatown loses his eyes in an accidental explosion in the mills, forcing him to adapt to the industrial world as a blind man. Big Mat is the last one to leave behind his tradition. While at home he lashed out in anger against his oppressors, such as the riding boss, in the North Big Mat joins the oppressor as he becomes a deputy, using his anger to break his fellow workers' strike. Edward E. Waldron describes him as becoming "as destructive as the exploding furnace".

== Style ==
=== Form of the migration narrative ===
In her book, Who Set You Flowin'?: The African American Migration Narrative, Farah Jasmine Griffin explains that the migration narrative is a dominant form in African American culture. Griffin cites Lawrence Rodgers as the first to identify migration with the emergence of a new genre: the Great Migration Novel. This type of work that Blood on the Forge is associated with has a specific narrative form. In relation to the dominant white society, all migrants are strangers: foreigners driven by persecution to wander in search of a new home. In Attaway's novel, the mill workers all fall under this category. The Moss brothers work with foreign immigrants as well as other Southern migrants like themselves. Within the context of the African American community, the stranger is that figure who possesses no connections to the community. As they migrate to the industrial North, the Moss brothers leave their home and traditions, and start over in a place where they have no connections.

Griffin describes four moments that occur in migration narratives. Not all migration narratives have all four, and they need not occur in this order. 1) An event that propels action north. In Blood on the Forge, this event is the opportunity for new jobs and a better life. 2) Presentation of the initial confrontation within the urban landscape. The first confrontation the Moss brothers have is when they get off the train and arrive in the city for their new job. As they do this, they meet immigrants and are confronted with the diversity and entirely different atmosphere of the urban landscape. 3) Illustration of attempt to negotiate. The bulk of the novel is the brothers trying to adapt to their new lifestyle. 4) Vision of possibilities or limitations of the North. We see both limitations and possibilities of the North in this novel. At the end as Melody and Chinatown leave for a new opportunity in a new city, there is a sense of possibility for a better situation than the previous one. Limitations of the North can be seen in several instances throughout the story. Chinatown loses his eyes in a fatal explosion in the mills, and Big Mat loses his life trying to gain respect.

== Characters ==
=== Major characters ===
==== Big Mat ====
Big Mat is the eldest of the three Moss brothers. In Part One of Attaway's novel he is employed as a sharecropper on Mr. Johnston's farm in Kentucky. Of the three brothers Big Mat's most notable attributes are his physical size/strength, his rage, and his constant need to be a provider for his family. After the brothers migrate to Pennsylvania Big Mat focuses his energies on doing well at his new job, and scrupulously saves his money so that he might bring his wife Hattie North. Eventually his resolve breaks and Big Mat enters into a relationship with the prostitute Anna. Mat continues to use his physical strength as a weapon against others until his death during the raid of the Union Headquarters. According to Phillip H. Vaughan's article "From Pastoralism to Industrial Antipathy in William Attaway's Blood on the Forge" Attaway uses Big Mat's character to represents "the plodding strength and endurance of all Southern Negroes under their particular color-caste system".

Edward E. Waldron claims that Big Mat represents "the last side of the complete folk culture, religion, and an equally important tie to the soil. " John Claborn asserts that while Melody and Chinatown become destroyed in the North, Big Mat "thrives" in his new home, as he, "identifies more with the machines than with his fellow white workers, for they allow him to flourish in a way denied him by Jim Crow. "

==== Chinatown Moss ====
Chinatown is a younger half sibling to Big Mat. Chinatown resists sharecropping work, instead enjoying a lazy and carefree lifestyle on the Kentucky farm. Chinatown focuses on his own needs before those of the family, using his money on frivolous items such as a gold tooth. After leaving the farm, Chinatown, succumbing to the temptations offered by city life in Pennsylvania, becomes fascinated with drinking, gambling, and hiring prostitutes. Midway through the novel, Chinatown is left blind after an accident at the steel mill and is forced out of work and into the care of Big Mat and Melody. Phillip H. Vaughan argues that Chinatown's "lazy, happy-go-lucky attitude reflects in part a psychological response to the subjugated position of the Negroes" following the abolition of slavery.

Edward E. Waldron claims that Chinatown's main concern in life is to make himself unique, to be noticed as special; his gold tooth provides relief for this concern, and "looking at the tooth shining back at him from his mirror image gives Chinatown a real sense of being somebody. " Stacy I. Morgan claims that the tooth represents Chinatown's "fragile sense of self-esteem," and that he "fixes on the gold tooth as a way of struggling to affirm his individuality and humanity in the face of a socioeconomic system that would otherwise reduce him to a faceless sharecropper.

==== Melody Moss ====
Melody, like Chinatown, is a younger half-sibling to Big Mat. Melody's most prominent characteristic is his love for music, which is expressed through his guitar playing. Once the brothers migrate to Pennsylvania, Melody is forced to work in the steel mills alongside his brothers; this harsh new way of life alienates Melody from his guitar, and he ceases to play. Melody develops feelings for Anna, despite her relationship with Big Mat, and tries to convince her to run away with him. According to Vaughan, Melody's blues singing "recreates and sustains the pastoral myth... and an existence characterized by images of hunger, barrenness, and drudgery".

=== Minor characters ===
==== Hattie ====
Hattie is Big Mat's wife. When the Moss Brothers travel North, Hattie is left behind pregnant. Big Mat receives a letter from Hattie saying that she fell and lost the baby.

==== Sugar Mama ====
Sugar Mama is a prostitute from "Mex Town."

==== Anna ====
Anna is fourteen or fifteen years old and Sugar Mama's niece. Sugar Mama sent for Anna from New Mexico, thinking she would bring more business. At first, Anna tries to sleep with Melody, but when Big Mat defends Anna after an owner at the dog fight hits her, she becomes infatuated with Big Mat. Anna moves into a shack with Big Mat, where she endures his beatings.

==== Smothers ====
Smothers is a crippled laborer. In an article published in MFS Modern Fiction Studies, John Claborn claims that Smothers is "a prophetic spokesman for the earth's pain." Claborn notes that Smother's legs have been mutilated in a violent steel mill incident, and claims that "Smothers's shrill prophecies are the product of wisdom gained through suffering, of a heightened sense of what the ground feels as it is mined, smelted, and made into steel. "

After Smothers dies in a mill accident, his co-workers memorialize him by turning the steel scraps from the accident into watch fobs, wearing these around their necks for luck.

==== Mr. Johnston ====
The Moss brothers sharecrop on Mr. Johnson's land in Kentucky. Mr. Johnston had stopped giving the family food credit after Big Mat killed the mule Mr. Johnston had lent them, and claims the Moss family's share of the crop for the next two years to pay for the loss of the animal. However, Mr. Johnston wants to prevent the brothers from leaving to work in the North, so he tells Big Mat that he will give the Moss' a mule so that they can continue to work their land, and offers Melody and Chinatown work doing odd jobs around his farm.

==== Riding Boss ====
Big Mat identifies the Kentucky riding boss as the son of a poor white sharecropper. When Big Mat goes to get the mule he was promised by Mr. Johnston, the riding boss, eager to exert his power, insults and whips Big Mat. Big Mat loses his temper and attacks the riding boss, prompting the brothers' departure to the north.

==== Bo ====
Bo is the "boss of stove gang" who catches Chinatown and Melody staring at the woman with the "rotted" breast. Bo points Chinatown and Melody in the right direction of the bunkhouse.

==== Mike ====
Mike is an Italian open-hearth worker who helps the brothers learn the ropes around the mill.

==== O'Casey ====
O'Casey is the diminutive pit boss in charge of the brothers' group at the mill.

==== Zanski ====
Zanski is an old, Slavic laborer who works with the brothers in the pit and works at the lunch car with his granddaughter, Rosie. He's eventually fired from the mills.

==== Rosie ====
Rosie is Zanski's granddaughter who waitresses at the lunch car. Later in the novel it is revealed that she also works as a prostitute.

== Themes ==
=== Nature ===
There is something very timely in Attaway's implicit warning against the industry of the North, as Edward Margolies suggests in his introduction to the 1969 edition of the novel: possibly he [Attaway] saw his worst fears realized in the rapid spread industrial wastelands and the consequent plight of urban Negroes. From one point of view Attaway's feelings about the sanctity of nature now seem almost quaint in an age of cybernetics.

The Moss brothers idealize nature, looking back on their homeland of Kentucky with a certain pastoral fondness. Although the nature of the South is idealized, in both the North and the South nature is dying. In the South, Attaway highlights the overworked land, Big Mat's barren wife Hattie, the family’s extreme hunger, and the drudgery of plowing all day with no reward. Likewise, the urban landscape of the North is also painted as dismal and dying. In the North, Attaway shows the defilement of natural landscape, evident "in the pollution of the 'dirty-as-a-catfish-hole river with a beautiful name: the Monongahela," as well as the "'mountains of red ore, yellow limestone, and black coke,' that line the river banks."

Attaway's use of "mules" in both the South and North, in different contexts, highlights the Moss brothers' "unfamiliarity of the artifacts of industrial technology" as well as the similarities between the two places." "Mule" refers both to the animal in the South, and the "small engines that hauled steel along the river front" in the Northern mills." The mules, though in the South a part of nature and the pastoral nostalgia felt by the Moss brothers, essentially serve the same function as the mules of the mills; both types of mules perform a mechanized, repetitive task. Stacy I. Morgan argues that Attaway calls attention to the mechanical mules not only to contrast with the animals of sharecropping, but to call attention to the mule's prominence within African American history and folklore. Morgan also claims that Attaway "indirectly evokes America's unfulfilled promises of enfranchisement ('forty acres and a mule') as well as the long-standing identification of African American men with the mule as a creature that stubbornly endures despite being much abused as a beast of burden."

Attaway exposes the danger of destroying nature through the voice of the mill worker Smothers, who repeatedly warns his fellow workers of the destructive power of the machines. Though the workers seem to see Smothers' prophecies as merely "half-mad, shrill rants," Claborn argues that "Attaway goes out of his way to invest [Smothers] with a strange dignity and characterize him as a Tiresian speaker of truth. " Smothers sees that destruction of nature "can lead to can lead to industrial accidents, understood as the land avenging itself against humans. "

=== Hunger ===
Attaway depicts how African American sharecroppers were forcibly deprived of many of life's necessities. In Kentucky, the Moss brothers had to use newspapers attached to the wall in order to provide a bit of insulation, and they are so hungry that they chose to smoke or chew tobacco in an attempt to suppress their appetites. One way that they deal with this hunger is through music, and the novel opens with Melody playing the "hungry blues" on his guitar, which he hopes will distract his family members from their empty stomachs.

Metaphorically, the Moss brothers are also "hungry" for other possessions, those that would not satisfy their physical hunger but rather that part of themselves that desired for a comfortable, leisurely life. This hunger is expressed by the brothers through their "wishing game," where Melody and Chinatown fantasize about their ideal day. When the game is played in the South this idyllic day takes place in the city, where the brothers imagine that they are dressed in fine clothes, gamble all day, and eat and drink their favorite things. Once they migrate to the Northern city, this fantasy day takes place back home in the country. They experience this emotional, existential hunger in both locations. Stacy I. Morgan argues that they desire things that remain "ever out of reach," which shows that "the existential dimension of Attaway's hunger metaphor arises precisely out of this perpetually deferred set of desires."

==== North vs South ====
In an article published by Negro American Literature Forum, Edward E. Waldron claims that Attaway depicts an intricate examination of the "death of the blues", or the death of folk culture, with the Moss brothers' move from the South to the North. The changes in Melody and Chinatown reflect the overall changes that southern blacks experienced in the Great Migration, as they have to leave their folk ways behind in order to survive their new, "industrially-oriented environment."

Stacy I. Morgan also alludes to the ways in which the brothers' mind-set has shifted upon migrating to the North. Their vastly increased income in the North allows them new opportunities and multiple ways to spend their new capital, emphasizing instant gratification "

Morgan also notes that the Moss brothers' fear in the train scene, during which their inability to see each other fills each brother with a terrifying sense of isolation, may be Attway's way of highlighting an issue that confronted many who moved during the Great Migration: the "absence of material links to the family, community, and lifeways of former homes, which w[as] frequently demanded by the circumstances of the migration journey northward—a journey that, for many African Americans, did necessarily commence under cover of night. " Morgan asserts that with the absence of these links to their former selves, it was especially difficult for the migrants to retain any former cultural identity in their new homes.

==== Mechanization ====
Edward E. Waldron claims that Blood on the Forge is a story of "man's changing nature in the face of ever-increasing mechanization." Stacy I. Morgan states that the physical injuries experienced in the mills are extreme examples of the larger process going on: the "transforming [of] workers' sense of time and of their own bodies." Phyllis R. Klotman looks at the ways in which the three brothers bodies became tools, a part of machine: "Chinatown is blinded in an accident which eats up the lives of fourteen men; Melody’s hand is smashed so that he is no longer able to play the guitar; Big Mat is killed during the strike which he has become as unwitting tool the bosses wield against the white workers," suggesting that "the three brothers are systematically unmanned by the dehumanizing process of forging steel." One of the tragic outcomes in the novel, according to Klotman, is the loss of continuity in the lives of men who are almost human sacrifices to the industrial Moloch created by an unseen hand grasping for profits.

By wearing scraps of the steel that killed Smothers, John Claborn argues that the workers "give the steel a ritual value that escapes the logic of exchange value; these scraps open up a space for resistance, insofar as they signify the workers' communal bonding." With this act, Attaway may signify a "shift in the workers' consciousness," as "the narration itself seems to gain a heightened awareness of the connection between steel and the ground." In addition, Claborn feels that "Smothers is ritually sacrificed for the sake of more direct commentary on steel production as a globally interdependent process." As Attaway wrote, "The nearness of a farmer to his farm was easily understood. But no man was close to steel. It was shipped across endless tracks to all the world."

Claborn claims that Big Mat embodies the link between mechanic and racial violence. Once he is deputized, given power by the white law enforcement, and charged to "suppress the white workers," he "relishes the terror he inspires." Claborn notes that, "once the strike begins and the furnaces start to cool down because there are not enough workers to keep them burning, Big Mat single-handedly tries to keep the machines functioning," and claims that this "impossible effort" shows that "Big Mat has himself become a machine." "Only as he dies […] does Big Mat glimpse the reality that, in siding with the mill owners and in becoming a machine, he has become an agent of oppression."

==== Myth of the American Dream and the working class ====
Attaway's novel depicts how industrial technology dehumanizes working class laborers, alienates workers from the products of their labors, and also highlights how capitalism moved towards mechanized standardization and away from individualized artistry and craftsmanship.

The character Anna in particular illustrates another aspect of the American myth, according to Stacy I. Morgan, as Anna dreams of becoming "like the Americanos." However, Morgan writes, Anna attempts to move up in class by wearing shiny heels and an elaborate gown, and thereby "misapprehends the complexity of American class identity by reducing it to material cultural signs." Eventually, her dress becomes filthy from being dragged in the mud, and Anna must wear it "pinned like a diaper between her legs," which Morgan claims illustrates how that "the icon intended as a symbol of maturity and class status" becomes a symbol of "Anna's childishness." In addition, Morgan notes that Anna is "tragically pathetic," forbidden by Big Mat to go out in public, the space "for which such ostentatious apparel is designed."

== Critical reception ==
Attaway's novels were not a major attraction to critics at their time of publication. Although Attaway's novels were received well, they have not been as critically acclaimed as other novels written during the 1940s, including The Grapes of Wrath (Steinbeck, 1939) and Native Son (Wright, 1941) which have both maintained an exceptional reputation for radical novels written during the Great Depression. Attaway did not continue writing novels after Blood on the Forge, but instead went on to successfully write and produce songs, music and screenplays.
