= The Merrymen =

Barbadian calypso band

The Merrymen, sometimes written as The MerryMen, is a popular calypso band from Barbados.

The Merrymen's career spans five decades, from the early-1960s to the 2000s. At their height they were popular throughout the Caribbean and had reached the number one spot on the charts of several European countries.

== History ==
They played their first show in 1962 at the Drift Wood Cellar Bar, one of the many bars along "The Gap", reportedly getting only the equivalent of Bds$36 (US$18) for their performance.

Their first album, Caribbean Treasure Chest was released in 1962.

The Merrymen have performed for British Royalty on three occasions. Also, they have performed for Ronald Reagan and Nancy Reagan during their 1982 visit to Barbados. The Merrymen were invited back by the President and First Lady to the White House. The group has shared the stage with Rich Little, Tom Jones, Dusty Springfield, and many others. They have been the highlight at such venues as The O'Keefe Center (now Meridian Hall), Skydome (Rogers Center), Hamilton Place, Royal Albert Hall, Royal Festival Hall, Massey Hall, and many others. Their most notable appearances were at venues such as the Ontario Place Forum where The Merrymen broke and held the attendance record for 20 years, and their 1979 performance at the Super Bowl Half Time Show in Miami, plus the Ed Sullivan Show.

== Sound and style ==
Their trademark sound is an upbeat form of calypso, reminiscent of what was popular in the Caribbean in the late-1960s and early-1970s, that samples liberally from Latin, funk, tuk and spouge musical styles. Lead singer Emile Straker's whistling is one of the most distinctive components of their sound, and often serves as the primary focus of the musical interludes in their songs. They have produced several memorable covers in this style, including versions of "Island in the Sun" (originally by Harry Belafonte), "Jamaica Farewell", "Hot Hot Hot", "Mary's Boy Child" and "Big Bamboo".

In addition to their characteristic sound, they are also known for the distinctive costumes they wear while performing and on their album and promotional photographs. The costumes are inspired by troubadour costumes from the High Middle Ages, a nod to one of the inspirations for their name (which may also refer to 14th century outlaws, or Robin Hood's band of "Merry Men").

== Post disillusion ==
- Robin Hunte, tenor guitarist, died from cancer, on August 24, 2015.
- Chris Gibbs, bass guitarist and one of four original members, in 2003 became the first person from a Caribbean country to swim the English Channel, in a time of 11 hours 30 minutes. He died from cancer at 80 on June 17, 2025.
- Emile Straker, lead singer, was knighted in 2019, at a ceremony at the Kensington Oval in Barbados by the then Governor General Sandra Mason. He published his autobiography in 2023, My Island and Me and died in June 2026.
- Stephen Fields, guitarist.
- Willie Kerr, guitarist, and Peter Roett, drummer, periodically perform with other local acts in Barbados.

== Personnel ==
- Emile Straker - Lead Vocal, Guitar
- Robin Hunte - Tenor Guitar, Electric Mandolin
- Willie Kerr - Lead Guitar
- Stephen Fields - Guitar and Vocals
- Chris Gibbs - Bass Guitar
- Peter Roett - Drums & Percussion (1976 onwards)
- Robert Foster - Drums & Percussion (1966 to 1976)

== Discography ==
- Introducing the Merrymen
- Land of the Sea and Sun
- Fun in the Sun
- Just for You
- You Sweeten Me
- The Merrymen Go From Dusk 'til Dawn
- Sing and Swing With the Merrymen
- Merry Christmas
- Beautiful Barbados
- Colour It Calypso
- Caribbean Treasure Chest
- Standing Room Only
- The More the Merrier
- Sun Living
- Don't Stop the Carnival
- Caribeat
- Merry Moods
- Calypso and Island Songs
- Barbados Memories
- At the Caribbean Pepperpot
- Sugar-Jam
- Jolly Roger Jump-up
- Come to my Island
- No Big Thing
- The Best of the Merrymen
- Party Animal
- Sweet Fuh Days
- Greatest Hits Vol.1
- Islands
- Yellow Bird
