= Harry & Lena =

Harry and Lena

Studio album by Harry Belafonte and Lena Horne
- Released: 1970
- Recorded: 1970
- Label: RCA Victor
- Producer: Chiz Schultz

Harry Belafonte chronology
Homeward Bound (1970)	Harry and Lena (1970)	Belafonte by Request (1970)

Lena Horne chronology
Lena & Gabor (1969)	Harry & Lena (1970)	Nature's Baby (1971)

Harry & Lena is a 1970 studio album issued by RCA Records by Harry Belafonte and Lena Horne. In 1970, Belafonte Enterprises produced an ABC television special featuring Harry Belafonte and Lena Horne. The hour special titled Harry & Lena, For The Love Of Life was broadcast on March 22, 1970, featuring solo and duet performances. Fabergé, sponsor of both the program and this studio recording of songs featured and performed in the television special, issued as a limited collectors edition. Originally, the album was available only by mail order and not sold in record stores.

== Track listing ==
1. "Walk a Mile in My Shoes" (Joe South) Duet Harry Belafonte and Lena Horne
2. "My Old Man" (Jerry Jeff Walker) Harry Belafonte
3. "It's Always Somewhere Else" (Jake Holmes) Lena Horne
4. "In My Life" (John Lennon, Paul McCartney) Lena Horne
5. "The Ghetto" (Homer Banks, Bettye Crutcher, Bonnie Bramlett) Harry Belafonte
6. "Brown Baby" (Oscar Brown, Jr.) Lena Horne
7. "Down on the Corner" (John Fogerty) Harry Belafonte
8. "Subway to the Country" (David Ackles) Harry Belafonte
9. "Measure the Valleys" (Robert Brittan, Judd Woldin) Lena Horne
10. "Love Story (You and Me)" (Randy Newman) Duet Harry Belafonte and Lena Horne
11. "I Want to Be Happy" (Vincent Youmans, Irving Caesar) Lena Horne
12. "The First Time Ever I Saw Your Face" (Ewan MacColl) Duet Harry Belafonte and Lena Horne
13. "Don't It Make You Wanna Go Home" (South) Duet Harry Belafonte and Lena Horne
14. "Abraham, Martin and John" (Dick Holler) Harry Belafonte

== Personnel ==
- Bob Freedman - arranger, conductor
- William Eaton

Performance

- Harry Belafonte - vocals
- Lena Horne
