= An Evening with Belafonte/Mouskouri =

Live album by Harry Belafonte, Nana Mouskouri
- Released: 1966
- Recorded: RCA Victor Studio A, New York City
- Genre: World
- Label: RCA Victor
- Producer: Andy Wiswell

Harry Belafonte, Nana Mouskouri chronology
An Evening with Belafonte/Makeba (1965)	An Evening with Belafonte/Mouskouri (1966)	In My Quiet Room (1966)

Professional ratings
Review scores
Source	Rating
Allmusic	3/5 stars

An Evening With Belafonte/Mouskouri is an album by Harry Belafonte and Nana Mouskouri, released by RCA Victor (LPM/LSP-3415) in 1966.

== Chart performance ==
The album peaked at No. 124 on the Billboard Top LPs, during an eight-week run on the chart.

== Track listing (including Greek Title) ==
1. "My Moon" ("Fengari Moo")
2. "Dream" ("Oneero")
3. "If You Are Thirsty" ("Kean Tha Depsasees")
4. "The Train" ("To Traino")
5. "In the Small Boat" ("Mes Tin Varka")
6. "The Town Crier" ("Telalees")
7. "Walking on the Moon" ("Pame mia Volta") [can also be heard in the Greek motion picture: "Never on Sunday"]
8. "The Baby Snake" ("Feedakee")
9. "The Wide Sea" ("Thalassa Platia")
10. "Irene" ("Erene")

== Personnel ==
- Harry Belafonte – vocals (1, 3, 5, 7, 9, 10)
- Nana Mouskouri – vocals (2, 3, 4, 6, 8, 10)
- George Petsilas – guitar, bouzouki
- Ernie Calabria – guitar
- Jay Berliner – guitar
- John Cartwright – bass
- Percy Brice – percussion
- Ralph MacDonald – percussion

Production notes:

- Andy Wiswell – producer
- Musical direction and choral arrangements by Howard Roberts
- Harry Belafonte – executive producer
- Bob Simpson – engineer

== Charts ==
Chart (1966)	Peak position
US Billboard Top LPs	124
