= Belafonte Sings the Blues =

Studio album by Harry Belafonte
- Released: 1958
- Recorded: 1958
- Genre: Jazz blues
- Length: 45:39
- Label: RCA Victor
- Producer: Ed Welker

Harry Belafonte chronology
To Wish You a Merry Christmas (1958)	Belafonte Sings the Blues (1958)	Love Is a Gentle Thing (1959)

Professional ratings
Review scores
Source	Rating
AllMusic	3/5 stars

Belafonte Sings the Blues is an album by Harry Belafonte, released by RCA Victor (LPM/LSP-1972) in 1958.

== Background ==
It was recorded in New York City on January 29 (with Alan Greene as conductor) and March 29 (with Bob Corman as conductor), and in Hollywood on June 5 and 7 (conducted by Dennis Farnon). The album was Belafonte's first to be recorded in stereophonic sound.

== Chart performance ==
The album peaked at No. 16 on the Billboard Top Pop Albums, during a fifteen-week run on the chart.

== Track listing ==
1. "A Fool for You" (Ray Charles)
2. "Losing Hand" (Charles Calhoun (Jesse Stone)
3. "One For My Baby" (Johnny Mercer, Harold Arlen)
4. "In the evenin' mama = In the evening (when the sun goes down)" (Leroy Carr)
5. "Hallelujah I Love Her So" (Ray Charles)
6. "The Way That I Feel" (Fred Brooks)
7. "Cotton Fields" (C. C. Carter)
8. "God Bless the Child" (Billie Holiday. Arthur Herzog Jr.)
9. "Mary Ann" (Ray Charles)
10. "Sinner's Prayer" (Lowell Fulson)
11. "Fare Thee Well" (Fred Brooks)

== Personnel ==
- Harry Belafonte – vocals

== Charts ==
Chart (1958)	Peak position
US Billboard Top Pop Albums	16
