= Belafonte on Campus =

Studio album by Harry Belafonte
- Released: 1967
- Recorded: 1967 at RCA Victor Studio A, New York City
- Genre: Vocal, folk
- Label: RCA Victor
- Producer: Andy Wiswell

Harry Belafonte chronology
Calypso in Brass (1966)	Belafonte on Campus (1967)	Belafonte Sings of Love (1968)

Professional ratings
Review scores
Source	Rating
Allmusic	4/5 stars

Belafonte on Campus is an album by Harry Belafonte, released in 1967.

== Chart performance ==
The album peaked at No. 199 on the Billboard Top LPs, during a three-week stay on the chart.

== Track listing ==
1. "Roll On, Buddy" (Traditional) – 2:45
2. "The Hands I Love" (Gordon Lightfoot) – 4:57
3. "The Last Thing on My Mind" (Tom Paxton) – 3:47
4. "Delia" (Fred Brooks, Lester Judson) – 3:42
5. "The Far Side of the Hill" (Vicki Arnold) – 3:30
6. "Waly, Waly (False Love)" – 4:43
7. "Sail Away Ladies" (Traditional, Bill Eaton) – 3:21
8. "The First Time Ever I Saw Your Face" (Ewan MacColl) – 3:37
9. "Hold On to Me Babe" (Paxton) – 3:40
10. "Those Three Are on My Mind" – 3:43
11. "The Dog Song" (James Bevel, Bernard Lafayette) – 4:25

== Personnel ==
- Harry Belafonte – vocals
- Al Schackman – guitar
- Ernie Calabria – guitar
- Bill Salter – bass
- Percy Brice – drums
- Ralph MacDonald – percussion
- Auchee Lee – percussion
- Arranged and conducted by Bill Eaton

Production notes:

- Andy Wiswell – producer
- Bob Simpson – engineer
- William Attaway – liner notes

== Chart positions ==
Year	Chart	Position
1967	Billboard Top LPs	199
