= Belafonte by Request =

Belafonte By Request

Studio album by Harry Belafonte
- Released: 1970
- Recorded: RCA's Music Center of the World, Hollywood, California, and RCA's Studio B, New York City
- Genre: Pop
- Label: RCA Victor
- Producer: Jack Pleis, Andy Wiswell

Harry Belafonte chronology
Harry & Lena (1970)	Belafonte By Request (1970)	The Warm Touch (1971)

Professional ratings
Review scores
Source	Rating
Allmusic	2.5/5 stars

Belafonte By Request is an album by Harry Belafonte, released by RCA Records in 1970.

== Track listing ==
1. "Mr. Bojangles" (Jerry Jeff Walker) – 4:56
2. "Oh Linda" (Gordon Lightfoot) – 3:14
3. "Missouri Birds" (John Stewart) – 3:54
4. "Big City Living" – 3:15
5. "Abraham, Martin and John" (Dick Holler) – 3:55
6. "You'll Still Be Needing Me After I'm Gone" (Gordon Lightfoot) – 3:42
7. "Marianne" (William Eaton) – 3:10
8. "Scarborough Fair / Canticle" (Traditional, Paul Simon, Art Garfunkel) – 3:26
9. "Put Your Tears Away" (Bobby Scott, Richard Ahlert) – 3:27
10. "I've Got a Secret" (Fred Neil) – 3:51

== Personnel ==
- Harry Belafonte – vocals
- Arranged and conducted by William Eaton

Production notes:

- Jack Pleis – producer
- Andy Wiswell – producer "Put Your Tears Away"
- Paul Goodman – engineer
- Pete Abbott – engineer
- Ken Whitmore – cover, liner notes
