= In My Quiet Room =

Studio album by Harry Belafonte
- Released: 1966
- Recorded: 1966 at RCA Victor Studio A, New York City
- Genre: Vocal
- Length: 38:48
- Label: RCA Victor
- Producer: Andy Wiswell

Harry Belafonte chronology
An Evening with Belafonte/Mouskouri (1966)	In My Quiet Room (1966)	Calypso in Brass (1966)

Professional ratings
Review scores
Source	Rating
Allmusic	1.5/5 stars

In My Quiet Room is an album by Harry Belafonte, released by RCA Victor (LPM-3571 and LSP-3571) in 1966. The orchestra was conducted by Howard A. Roberts and arranged by Hugo Montenegro, with musical coordination by Bill Eaton.

== Chart performance ==
The album peaked at No. 82 on the Billboard Top LPs, during a ten-week run on the chart.

== Track listing ==
1. "Quiet Room" (Fred Hellerman, Fran Minkoff) – 4:38
2. "Portrait of a Sunday Afternoon" (Hellerman, Minkoff) – 3:15
3. "Raindrops" (Mike Settle) – 2:33
4. "Our Time for Loving" (Hellerman, Minkoff) – 5:11
5. "The Honey Wind Blows" (Hellerman, Minkoff) – 3:40
6. "The Girls in their Summer Dresses" (Jim Friedman) – 3:45
7. "Long About Now" (Hellerman, Minkoff) – 4:24
8. "I'm Just a Country Boy" (Fred Brooks, Marshall Barer) – 3:43
9. "Summertime Love" (Frank Loesser) – 3:45
10. "Try to Remember" (Tom Jones, Harvey Schmidt) – 4:04

== Personnel ==
- Harry Belafonte – vocals
- Orchestra conducted by Howard A. Roberts
- Arrangements by Hugo Montenegro

Production notes:

- Andy Wisell – producer
- Bob Simpson – engineer
- Bill Eaton – musical coordinator

== Chart positions ==
Year	Chart	Position
1966	Billboard Top LPs	82
