= Belafonte Sings of Love =

Studio album by Harry Belafonte
- Released: 1968
- Recorded: 1968 at RCA Victor's Studio A, New York City
- Genre: Vocal, pop
- Label: RCA Victor
- Producer: Ernie Altschuler, Andy Wiswell

Harry Belafonte chronology
Belafonte on Campus (1967)	Belafonte Sings of Love (1968)	Homeward Bound (1970)

Professional ratings
Review scores
Source	Rating
Allmusic	1.5/5 stars

Belafonte Sings of Love is an album by Harry Belafonte, released by RCA Victor in 1968.

== Track listing ==
1. "By the Time I Get to Phoenix" (Jimmy Webb) – 2:42
2. "Annie-Love" – 3:29
3. "Sleep Late, My Lady Friend" (Harry Nilsson) – 2:18
4. "Once in My Lifetime" (Sharpe, Henrique) – 2:59
5. "You Time" (Wood) – 2:59
6. "In the Beginning" (Fred Hellerman, Fran Minkoff) – 2:46
7. "A Day in the Life of a Fool (Manhã de Carnaval)" (Carl Siman, Antonio Marizand, Luiz Bonfá) – 2:17
8. "When Spring Comes Around" (Jim Friedman) – 3:14
9. "In the Name of Love" (Estelle Levitt, Kenny Rankin) – 2.35
10. "The First Day of Forever" (Fred Hellerman, Fran Minkoff) – 2:26
11. "Each Day (I Look for Yesterday)" (Charles Singleton, Bert Keyes) – 1:57

== Personnel ==
- Harry Belafonte – vocals
- Arranged and conducted by Marty Manning

Production notes:

- Ernie Altschuler – producer
- Andy Wiswell – producer
- Bob Simpson – engineer
