= Music editor =

The term music editor may refer to one of several occupations. In publishing, a music editor is a person who prepares music manuscripts for publication. The use of music editors began at the onset of music publishing in Europe in the late 15th century. In film-making, a music editor is an occupation in which a person assists the music composer in the music recording process, and makes edits to the recorded music track to fit the film's cinematography. In journalism, a music editor refers to a news-editor who oversees the news content in relation to the subject of music.

== Music editors in publication ==
In publishing, a music editor is an occupation in which a person prepares music manuscripts for publication. This includes proofreading and correcting errors in submitted scores, and may include additional work in adjusting music arrangements, orchestrations, and even sometimes re-composing passages. Music editors may also have input in determining what music is published by a publishing company, and sometimes are members of acquisition committees within a publishing company in which they make value judgments of a work's suitability for publication in relation to music quality, music style, and marketability.

Music publishing firms utilize a variety of types of music editors which may be internal to the publishing company itself, or attached to a larger publishing house which contracts with smaller music publishing firms. Many working music editors also work professionally as music arrangers or composers. Most music editors specialize within a particular area of music, such as piano music, choral music, orchestral music, or jazz. Working music editors typically have a university degree in music with a strong background in music theory, music history, and performance practices.

Music editors who work in classical music may have specialized skills. This includes working with documents which are sometimes centuries old, including both handwritten manuscripts and scores which were made by European engravers or early printing presses which do not conform to contemporary music notation and score formatting practices. In these cases, music editors must analyze the scores and transcribe them into modern music notation and formats.

=== Early history of the profession ===
The use of music editors dates to the very beginning of published music in Europe in the late 15th century; although individuals working in that capacity were usually not named. One of the earliest known music editors was the Venetian Dominican friar Petrus Castellanus (1440–1552) who worked in that capacity for the publisher Ottaviano Petrucci in the first half of the 16th century. The Italian composer Francesco de Layolle was another early known music editor; working in that capacity for the Lyon, France based publisher Jacques Moderne.

== Music editors in film ==
In film, a music editor is responsible for assisting the film score composer and making editing decisions in relation to the music track of the film. Their job often involves hiring musicians, taking notes in recording sessions, making suggested cuts, and ultimately editing recorded material to fit the music to the film.
