= Homeward Bound (album) =

Studio album by Harry Belafonte
- Released: 1970
- Genre: Vocal, pop
- Label: RCA Victor
- Producer: Jack Pleis, Andy Wiswell

Harry Belafonte chronology
Belafonte Sings of Love (1968)	Homeward Bound (1970)	Harry & Lena (1970)

Professional ratings
Review scores
Source	Rating
Allmusic	2/5 stars

Homeward Bound is an album by Harry Belafonte, released by RCA Records in 1970.

== Chart performance ==
The album peaked at No. 192 on the Billboard Top LPs, during a three-week run on the chart.

== Track listing ==
1. "Homeward Bound" (Paul Simon) – 3:49
2. "Sad Heart" (Aufray, Massey) – 4:35
3. "The Last Time I Saw Her" (Gordon Lightfoot) – 5:20
4. "The Dolphin" (Fred Neil) – 2:54
5. "If I Were a Carpenter" (Tim Hardin) – 3:37
6. "Don't Talk Now – 3:09
7. "Softly" (Lightfoot) – 3:40
8. "Suzanne" (Leonard Cohen) – 4:10
9. "Tomorrow Is a Long Time" (Bob Dylan) – 3:27
10. "Little Bird" (Jerry Jeff Walker) – 4:20

== Personnel ==
- Harry Belafonte – vocals
- Arranged and conducted by William Eaton

Production notes:

- Jack Pleis – producer
- Andy Wiswell – producer
- Bob Simpson – engineer
- Pete Abbott – engineer
- Ken Whitmore – cover, liner notes

== Charts ==
Chart (1970)	Peak position
US Billboard Top LPs	192
