= Mary's Boy Child =

- German single sleeve

Single by Harry Belafonte

from the album An Evening with Belafonte
- B-side: "Venezuela"
- Released: December 1956
- Recorded: July 1956
- Studio: Grand Ballroom, Webster Hall, New York City
- Genre: Christmas; calypso; exotica
- Length: 4:20 (album version; UK single version); 2:53 (US single version)
- Label: RCA Victor
- Songwriter: Jester Hairston

Harry Belafonte singles chronology
"Jamaica Farewell" (1954)	"Mary's Boy Child" (1956)	"Banana Boat (Day-O)" (1957)

"Mary's Boy Child", also known as "Mary's Little Boy Child" or "Mary's Little Boy Chile", is a 1956 Christmas song written by Jester Hairston. It is widely performed as a Christmas carol. The song is most associated with Harry Belafonte who released it as a single in December 1956, and on his album the following year, An Evening with Belafonte.

The song has been recorded twice by Andy Williams, once on his 1965 album Merry Christmas and again on his 1997 album We Need A Little Christmas, and was one of the best selling singles for disco-group Boney M. in 1978, as "Mary's Boy Child – Oh My Lord".

== History ==
The song had its genesis when Hairston was sharing a room with a friend. The friend asked him to write a song for a birthday party. Hairston wrote the song with a calypso rhythm because the people at the party would be mainly West Indians. The song's original title was "He Pone and Chocolate Tea", pone being a type of corn bread. It was never recorded in this form.

Some time later Walter Schumann, at the time conducting Schumann's Hollywood Choir, asked Hairston to write a new Christmas song for his choir. Hairston remembered the calypso rhythm from his old song and wrote new lyrics for it.

Harry Belafonte heard the song being performed by the choir and sought permission to record it. It was recorded in 1956 and released as a single that year. Belafonte released it again the following year in 1957 on his album An Evening with Belafonte, using a different, longer take. This longer version was also released in the UK as a single (with a B-side of "Eden Was Just Like This"), where it became the first UK number one to have a playing time of over four minutes. It reached No. 1 on the UK Singles Chart in November 1957, and has since sold over 1.19 million copies there.

In 1962, the full-length version was also added to a re-issue of Belafonte's previously released album To Wish You a Merry Christmas. Belafonte re-recorded the song with the London Symphony Orchestra and the American Boy Choir for Hallmark's The Tradition of Christmas in 1991.

Similarly, the song was arranged for chorus and recorded by the conductor Leonard De Paur for Columbia Records on the album Calypso Christmas in 1956 (Columbia, CL 923 Mono LP, 1956).

== Covers ==
One of the best-known cover versions of the song is from the German-based disco-group Boney M. from 1978, "Mary's Boy Child – Oh My Lord." This version returned the song to the top of the UK chart. It is one of the best-selling singles of all time in the UK, and has sold 1.87 million copies as of November 2015.

When Hairston found out how well the Boney M version had done, he said: "God bless my soul. That's tremendous for an old fogey like me". He was 78 at the time.

The song has been recorded twice by Andy Williams; once on his 1965 album Merry Christmas and again on his 1997 album We Need A Little Christmas. It has also been recorded by The Four Lads in 1956 and Mahalia Jackson in the late 1950s, and the Harry Simeone Chorale (1965) all three under the title Mary's Little Boy Chile. Other recordings include The Gospel Clefs in (1973), Evie (1977), Anne Murray, The Brothers Four, Greg MacDonald, The Lettermen (1966), The Merrymen, Jim Reeves (1963), Rolf Harris (1970), Roger Whittaker, The Little River Band, The Three Degrees, The Pete King Chorale, Nina & Frederik, Carola, Vikingarna, Kiri Te Kanawa (1984), José Mari Chan (1990), Al Bano and Romina Power (1991), De Nattergale (1991), Tom Jones (1993), Jose Feliciano, John Denver (1990), Cranberry Singers (1998), and the cast of Glee (2013), RJ Jacinto (2015), Harry Connick Jr, Bryn Terfel, Connie Talbot and many others. The Bee Gees recorded the song as part of a medley with "Silent Night" for their 1968 album Horizontal, although it was only officially released as a bonus track in 2006. The track is erroneously titled "Silent Night/Hark the Herald Angels Sing."

The song was also included on the 1991 live concert A Carnegie Hall Christmas Concert, featuring Kathleen Battle, Frederica von Stade and Wynton Marsalis.

Additional covers include a version by Charlotte Church as the fifth track on her 2000 album Dream a Dream, the Australian pop group Hi-5, released in 1998, a version by its American counterpart, released in 2005 but recorded in 2004, The Wiggles on their 2004 album Santa's Rockin'; Juice Newton's folk-rock version on her 2007 The Gift of Christmas; Mandisa on her 2008 album It's Christmas; Paul Poulton's reggae version on his 2008 album Grooves 4 Scrooge; Daniel O'Donnell on his 2010 album O Holy Night; and Joe McElderry on his 2011 album Classic Christmas.

In 2012, the Portuguese priest António Cartageno made a choral arrangement for the song.

== Translations ==
Translated versions include "Hankien Joulu" recorded by Georg Malmstén, "Kauan Sitten Beetlehem" recorded by Petri Laaksonen (fi), "Marian Poika" by Tarja Turunen, "Varje människa har ett ljus" recorded by Jan Malmsjö, "...und Frieden für die Welt" by Rolf Zuckowski, "Maria's Kind" by La Esterella, "Bethlehem" by Rob de Nijs, "Det hände sig för länge sen" recorded by Kikki Danielsson on her 1987 Christmas album Min barndoms jular, "Det hände sig för länge sen" recorded by Stefan Borsch on his 1981 Christmas album I kväll jag tänder ett ljus, "Himlens hemlighet" recorded by Tommy Körberg and "Du är som en sommardag" by dance band Schytts. The Schytts version was in the Swedish chart Svensktoppen for 10 weeks in 1979, where it peaked at No. 1. "Ang Batang Hesus" by mayor_junneil (Filipino). The Sinhala translation is "Kalakata Pera e Bethleheme" Sinhala: "කලකට පෙර ඒ බෙත්ලෙහෙමේ".

== Other uses ==
The words and music featured on a miniature sheet issued with the 1983 Christmas stamps of the Caribbean island of St Kitts, while the adjacent island of Nevis issued a complementary sheet featuring the "Calypso Carol".

The tune is used as the basis for a widespread chant used in British football usually referencing a particular team's closest rivals and the historical boxing day derby games that took place until the 1980s.

== See also ==
- List of Christmas carols
