= Island in the Sun (Harry Belafonte song) =

Song by Harry Belafonte

Single by Harry Belafonte

from the album Belafonte Sings of the Caribbean
- Language: English
- B-side: "Cocoanut Woman"
- Released: May 1957
- Genre: Calypso
- Length: 3:15
- Label: RCA Victor
- Songwriter(s): Harry Belafonte, Irving Burgie

"Island in the Sun" is a song written by Harry Belafonte and Irving Burgie (Lord Burgess), and performed by Harry Belafonte for the 1957 film Island in the Sun and on his 1957 album Belafonte Sings of the Caribbean.

== Background ==
The song was one of two songs (the other song being "Lead Man Holler") written by Harry Belafonte and Irving Burgie for the 1957 film Island in the Sun, a film on racial tension and interracial romance. The song serves as the title song sung at the start of the film, which ends with Belafonte walking off to the humming of the song. Belafonte performed the song on The Ed Sullivan Show on June 9, 1957 to promote the film. It was also released as a single backed with "Cocoanut Woman" in May 1957; both songs charted, and "Island in the Sun" reached No. 30 on the Billboard's Best Sellers in Stores, and No. 42 on Top 100 Sides.

In 2017, Belafonte released the album When Colors Come Together: The Legacy of Harry Belafonte for his 90th birthday with the intention of fostering racial harmony, which included a new version of "Island in the Sun" titled "When Colors Come Together (Our Island in the Sun)" performed by a multi-ethnic children choir.

== Adaptation ==
In 1999, the song was adapted into a children's picture book, illustrated with cut-paper collages by Alex Ayliffe and published by Dial Books. The book was an Américas Award commended title and received generally positive reviews.

== Charts ==
Chart (1957–1958)	Peak position
Belgium (Ultratop 50 Flanders)	5
Belgium (Ultratop 50 Wallonia)	9
Canada (CHUM Hit Parade)	21
Netherlands (Single Top 100)	6
UK Singles (OCC)	3
US Best Sellers in Stores (Billboard)	30
US Cash Box Top 100	32
Chart (1989)	Peak position
West Germany (GfK)	69

== Other versions ==
The song has also been covered by many artists, including The Merrymen, John Rowles, José Carreras, The Paragons, and The Righteous Brothers.

In 1962, the song was performed by The Brothers Four on the album In Person/Cross-Country Concert.

The song has been sung in other languages; as early as 1958, Henri Salvador wrote lyrics and sang the song in French. Caterina Valente performed the song in German as "Wo meine Sonne scheint ".

Bo-Göran Edling wrote lyrics in Swedish, and as De tusen öars land, the song was recorded by the Streaplers, releasing it as a single in October 1969 with En enda kort minut acting as a B-side. and their version also charted at Svensktoppen for 19 weeks between 28 December 1969-4 May 1970, and managed to top the chart. With these lyrics the song was also recorded in 1970 by Nora Brockstedt, by Tage Öst in 1976, and Källströms in 1985 and finally in 2005 by Hans Martin.

With lyrics in Swedish by Margot Borgström, as Sol, öar, vind och hav, the song was also recorded by Schytts on the 1979 album Nya änglalåtar and their version charted for 10 weeks at Svensktoppen between 13 April-24 August 1980, and also managed to top the chart.

The Croatian version sung by Darko Rundek was recorded in 2000 for album U širokom svijetu (rereleased in 2017 on compilation ApoCalypso)
