= Man Smart (Woman Smarter) =

Calypso song

Single by King Radio
- B-side: "Frederick Street"
- Released: 1936
- Recorded: April 9, 1936
- Genre: Calypso
- Label: Decca
- Songwriter: Norman Span

"Man Smart (Woman Smarter)" is a calypso song variously credited as being composed by Norman Span (King Radio), D. L. Miller, F. Kuhn, and Charles Harris. Span's authorship seems most likely since, as a popular calypso musician and songwriter, he first recorded the song in 1936, and none of the other ascribed composers are associated with calypso. Miller's music industry career began around 1950.

Artists from many genres, including the Duke of Iron (on 1957's Calypso Carnival), Joan Baez (on 1964's Joan Baez in San Francisco), Harry Belafonte (on 1956's Calypso), the Carpenters (on 1977's Passage), Rosanne Cash (on 1979's Right or Wrong), Chubby Checker (on 1962's Limbo Party), Dr Victor and the Rasta Rebels (on 2006's When Somebody Loves You Back), Robert Palmer (on 1976's Some People Can Do What They Like), Boss & The Conch Shells (on their self-titled album), and Ratdog (on the 2003 live album Fall Tour 2003, Baltimore, MD Oct 20, 2003), have recorded the song. It was a staple of the live repertoire of the Grateful Dead from 1981 to 1995. Belafonte's first of three recordings of the song was included on his best-selling album Calypso, which reached number one on the Billboard Top Pop Albums chart in 1956, and remained on the chart for 31 weeks. Span is credited as the song's composer on Belafonte's albums. It is performed by Ricky Ricardo (Desi Arnaz), Lucy Ricardo (Lucille Ball), Fred Mertz (William Frawley) and Ethel Mertz (Vivian Vance) in the 1957 episode of I Love Lucy entitled "Ragtime Band". Muppet woodland animals performed a spoof of the song called "Man Smart, Critter Smarter" on a 1980 episode of The Muppet Show hosted by Joan Baez. A brief clip of a recording of Homer (Dan Castellaneta) and Marge Simpson (Julie Kavner) singing it was also heard in The Simpsons 1991 third season episode "Treehouse of Horror II".
