= Mark Twain and Other Folk Favorites =

Mark Twain and other Folk Favorites

Studio album by Harry Belafonte
- Released: 1954
- Recorded: RCA Victor's Manhattan Center and 24th Street Studios, April 9, 22 & 29 and May 13, 1954
- Genre: Vocal, calypso
- Label: RCA Victor LPM1022
- Producer: Hugo Winterhalter, Henri René, Jack Lewis, Joe Carlton

Harry Belafonte chronology
Mark Twain and other Folk Favorites (1954)	Belafonte (1955)

Professional ratings
Review scores
Source	Rating
Allmusic	3/5 stars

Mark Twain and other Folk Favorites is the debut album by Harry Belafonte, released by RCA Victor in 1954. The album peaked at No. 3 during four weeks on the Billboard Albums Chart.

== Track listing ==
1. "Mark Twain" (Traditional, Harry Belafonte) – 3:42
2. "Man Piaba" (Belafonte, Jack K. Rollins) – 3:30
3. "John Henry" (Traditional) – 3:27
4. "Tol' My Captain" (Paul Campbell) – 2:45
5. "Kalenda Rock (Mourning Song)" (Traditional) – 3:2
6. "The Drummer and the Cook" (Traditional, Paul Campbell) – 2:04
7. "The Fox" (Traditional, Campbell) – 2:43
8. "Soldier, Soldier" (Traditional, Campbell) – 1:37
9. "The Next Big River" (Traditional, Campbell) – 0:20
10. "Delia" (Fred Brooks, Lester Judson) – 2:58
11. "Mo Mary" (Richard Dyer-Bennett) – 2:15
12. "Lord Randall" (Traditional, Campbell) – 4:07

Paul Campbell was a fictitious entity used to copyright material in the public domain.

== Personnel ==
- Harry Belafonte – vocals
- Millard Thomas – guitar
- Orchestra and chorus supervised by Hugo Winterhalter

Production notes:

- Hugo Winterhalter – producer
- Henri René – producer
- Jack Lewis – producer
- Joe Carlton – producer
- Kysar – cover art
- Leonard Feather – liner notes

== Charts ==
Chart (1954)	Peak position
US Billboard Albums Chart	3
