= Calypso (album) =

Studio album by Harry Belafonte
- Released: May 1956
- Recorded: August 18, October 20, November 9, 1955
- Studio: Webster Hall, New York City
- Genre: Mento, calypso
- Length: 31:23
- Label: RCA Victor
- Producer: Ed Welker, Herman Diaz Jr., Henri René

Harry Belafonte chronology
Belafonte (1955)	Calypso (1956)	An Evening with Belafonte (1957)

Singles from Calypso
- 1. "Jamaica Farewell" Released: September 1956; 2. "Day-O (The Banana Boat Song)" Released: December 1956

Calypso is the third studio album by recording artist Harry Belafonte, released by RCA Victor (LPM-1248) in 1956. The album became his second consecutive number-one album on the Billboard Best Selling Pop Albums chart, where it peaked for 31 weeks. Calypso was the first Long Play record album to sell one million copies.

In 2015, Calypso was inducted into the Grammy Hall of Fame. In 2018, Calypso was selected for preservation in the National Recording Registry by the Library of Congress as being "culturally, historically, or aesthetically significant".

== Album information ==
The first track "Day-O (Banana Boat Song)" largely contributed to the success of the album and became Belafonte's signature song, the single reaching number five on Billboard's pop chart. "Star-O", the sixth track on the album (and B side of the "Day-O" single), is essentially a shorter reprise of "Day-O", with slightly different lyrics.

It is sung from the point of view of dock workers working the night shift loading bananas onto ships. Daylight has come, the shift is over, and they want their work to be counted up so that they can return to their homes (this is the meaning of the lyric "Come, Mr. Tally Man, tally me banana / Daylight come and me wan' go home.")

The third track, "Jamaica Farewell", is a mento folk song about the beauties of the West Indian islands and a love left behind. This was the first album on which the song was published. The song was released as a single, reaching number 14 on Billboard's pop chart, becoming the second hit from the album.

== Reception ==
Professional ratings
Review scores
Source	Rating
Allmusic	5/5 stars

Calypso was the first LP record album to sell over one million copies. Previously, other single records including Glenn Miller's "Chattanooga Choo Choo," Bing Crosby's "White Christmas," and Tennessee Ernie Ford's "Sixteen Tons" had surpassed the milestone. The album is number four on Billboard's "Top 100 Album" list for having spent 31 weeks at number 1, 58 weeks in the top ten, and 99 weeks on the U.S. album charts. AllMusic gave the album 5 stars out of 5 and called it "a record of inestimable influence".

== Track listing ==
Calypso track listing
No.	Title	Writer(s)	Length
1.	"Day-O (The Banana Boat Song)"	Traditional, arranged by William Attaway, Harry Belafonte, Lord Burgess	3:02
2.	"I Do Adore Her"	Burgess	2:48
3.	"Jamaica Farewell"	Burgess	3:02
4.	"Will His Love Be Like His Rum?"	Attaway, Belafonte	2:33
5.	"Dolly Dawn"	Burgess	3:13
6.	"Star-O"	Belafonte, Burgess, Attaway	2:02
7.	"The Jack-Ass Song"	Burgess, Attaway	2:52
8.	"Hosanna"	Burgess, Attaway	2:34
9.	"Come Back Liza"	Burgess, Attaway	3:03
10.	"Brown Skin Girl"	Norman Span	2:43
11.	"Man Smart (Woman Smarter)"	Span	3:31

== Personnel ==
- Harry Belafonte – vocals
- Millard J. Thomas – guitar (1, 4, 6, 7)
- Frantz Casseus – guitar
- Tony Scott and His Orchestra (2, 3, 5, 8, 9, 10, 11)
- The Norman Luboff Choir (8, 9, 10)

Production notes:

- Ed Welker – producer
- Herman Diaz Jr. – producer
- Henri René – producer ("Man Smart (Woman Smarter)")
- Tony Scott – conductor
- Brock Peters – chorus leader
- Roy Stevens – cover photo
- William Attaway – liner notes

== Charts ==
Chart (1956)	Peak position
US Best Selling Pop Albums (Billboard)	1

== Certifications ==
Region	Certification	Certified units/sales
United States (RIAA)	Gold	500,000^{^}
^{^} Shipments figures based on certification alone.
