= Day-O (The Banana Boat Song) =

Traditional Jamaican folk song

Single by Harry Belafonte

from the album Calypso
- Language: Jamaican Patois
- B-side: "Star-O"
- Released: 1956
- Genre: Mento; calypso; exotica
- Length: 3:02
- Label: RCA Victor
- Songwriters: Traditional, arranged: Harry Belafonte, William Attaway, Lord Burgess

Harry Belafonte singles chronology
"Mary's Boy Child" (1954)	"Day-O (The Banana Boat Song)" (1956)	"Hold 'Em Joe" (1957)

Official audio
- "Day-O (The Banana Boat Song)" on YouTube

"The Banana Boat Song"

Single by The Tarriers

from the album The Tarriers
- Language: Jamaican Patois
- B-side: "No Hidin' Place"
- Released: 1956
- Length: 2:58
- Label: Glory
- Songwriters: Alan Arkin, Bob Carey, Erik Darling

The Tarriers singles chronology
"The Banana Boat Song" (1956)	"Cindy, Oh Cindy" (1956)

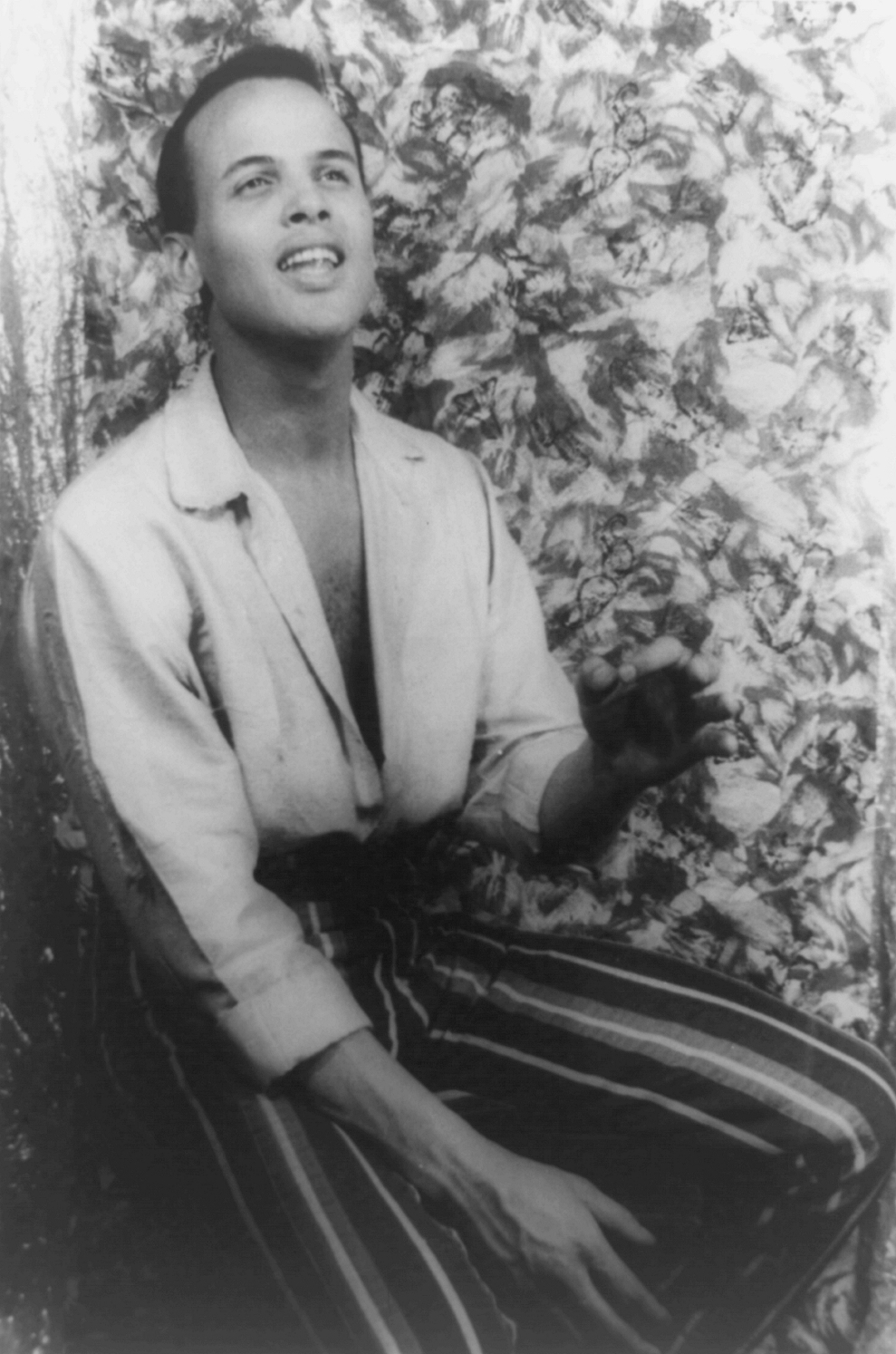
Harry Belafonte, Almanac, 18 February 1954

"Day-O (The Banana Boat Song)" is a traditional Jamaican folk song. The song has mento influences, but it is commonly classified as an example of the better-known calypso music.

It is a call and response work song, from the point of view of dock workers working the night shift loading bananas onto the large ocean-going cargo ships known as banana boats. The lyrics describe how daylight has come, their shift is over, and they want their work to be counted up so that they can go home.

The best-known version was released by Jamaican-American singer Harry Belafonte in 1956 (originally titled " Banana Boat (Day-O)") and later became one of his signature songs. That same year, the Tarriers released an alternative version that incorporated the chorus of another Jamaican call and response folk song, "Hill and Gully Rider". This version was played during an interview with Bob Carey (formerly of the Tarriers) on Folk Music Worldwide in January 1964. Both versions became simultaneously popular the following year, placing 5th and 6th on 20 February 1957, US Top 40 Singles chart. The Tarriers version was covered multiple times in 1956 and 1957, including by the Fontane Sisters, Sarah Vaughan, Steve Lawrence, and Shirley Bassey, all of whom charted in the top 40 in their respective countries.

Belafonte described "Day-O" as "a song about struggle, about black people in a colonized life doing the most grueling work," in a 2011 interview with Gwen Ifill on PBS News Hour. He said, "I took that song and honed it into an anthem that the world loved."

== History ==
"The Banana Boat Song" likely originated around the beginning of the 20th century when the banana trade in Jamaica was growing. It was sung by Jamaican dockworkers, who typically worked at night to avoid the heat of the daytime sun. When daylight arrived, they expected their boss would arrive to tally the bananas so they could go home.

The song was first recorded by Trinidadian singer Edric Connor and his band the Caribbeans on the 1952 album Songs from Jamaica; the song was called "Day Dah Light". Harry Belafonte based his version on Connor's 1952 and Louise Bennett's 1954 recordings.

In 1955, American singer-songwriters Lord Burgess and William Attaway wrote a version of the lyrics for The Colgate Comedy Hour, in which the song was performed by Harry Belafonte. Belafonte recorded the song for RCA Victor and was released on Belafonte's Calypso album and as a single, in 1956. This is the version that is best known to listeners today, as it reached number five on the Billboard charts in 1957 and soon became Belafonte's signature song. "Star O", a shorter reprise of "Day-O", with slightly different lyrics referring to the day shift ending when the first star is seen in the sky, was also included on the Calypso album.

Also in 1956, folk singer Bob Gibson, who had traveled to Jamaica and heard the song, taught his version to the folk band the Tarriers. They recorded a version of that song that incorporated the chorus of "Hill and Gully Rider", another Jamaican folk song. This release became their biggest hit, reaching number four on the pop charts, where it outperformed Belafonte's version. The Tarriers' version was recorded by the Fontane Sisters, Sarah Vaughan, and Steve Lawrence in 1956, all of whom charted in the US Top 40, and by Shirley Bassey in 1957, whose recording became a hit on the United Kingdom singles chart. The Tarriers, or some subset of the three members of the group (Erik Darling, Bob Carey and Alan Arkin, later better known as an actor) are sometimes credited as the writers of the song.

== In popular culture ==
- Freddie Mercury of Queen improvised his famous call and response at Live Aid in 1985 from the beginning of "Day-O".
- The "Day-O" chorus is used in many Major League Baseball stadiums to induce a call and response from fans.

== Notable covers ==
- Michiko Hamamura became famous in Japan as the "Banana Boat Girl" in 1957.
- The Fontane Sisters recorded the Tarriers version in a recording of the song for Dot Records in 1956. It charted to number 13 in the US in 1957.
- Sarah Vaughan and an orchestra conducted by David Carroll recorded a jazzy version for Mercury Records in 1956, credited to Darling, Carey, and Arkin of the Tarriers. It charted at number 19 on the US Top 40 charts in 1957.
- Shirley Bassey recorded the Tarriers version in 1957 for 4 Star Records, which became her first single to chart in the U.K., peaking at number 8. It later appeared on her 1959 album The Bewitching Miss Bassey.
- Steve Lawrence recorded the Tarriers version in 1957 for Coral Records for his album Songs by Steve Lawrence, with a chorus and orchestra directed by Dick Jacobs. It peaked at number 18 on the US Top 40 charts that year.
- Canadian children's singer Raffi recorded the song for his 1980 album, Baby Beluga, releasing it as the second single.
- A version of the song was recorded by Australian children's artist The Wiggles for their album You Make Me Feel Like Dancing. The album won the ARIA Award for Best Children's Album that year.

== Parodies and alternate lyrics ==
- "Banana Boat (Day-O)", a parody by Stan Freberg and Billy May released in 1957 by Capitol Records, features ongoing disagreement between an enthusiastic Jamaican lead singer (played by Freberg) and a bongo-playing beatnik (played by Peter Leeds) who "don't dig loud noises" and has the catchphrase "You're too loud, man". When he hears the lyric about the "deadly black taranch-la" (actually the highly venomous Brazilian wandering spider, commonly dubbed "banana spider"), the beatnik protests, "No, man! Don't sing about spiders, I mean, oooo! like I don't dig spiders". Freberg's version was popular, reaching number 25 on the US Top 40 charts in 1957, and received much radio airplay; Harry Belafonte reportedly disliked the parody. Stan Freberg's version was the basis for the jingle for the TV advert for the UK chocolate bar Trio from the mid-1980s to the early to mid-1990s, the lyrics being, "Trio, Trio, I want a Trio and I want one now. Not one, not two, but three things in it; chocolatey biscuit and a toffee taste too."
- Dutch comedian André van Duin released his version in 1972 called "Het Bananenlied" ("The Banana Song"). This song asks repetitively why bananas are bent. It reaches the conclusion that if the bananas weren't bent they wouldn't fit into their peels.
- German band Trio performed a parody with "Bommerlunder" (a German schnapps) substituted for the words "daylight come" in the 1980s.
- German musician Rolf Zuckowski published one of his many children's songs in 1983 called Theo (Der Bananenbrot-Song). In the song, which stays true to the original melody, a boy calls out for help to his friend Theo to make him a banana bread, since he himself is so hungry.
- The Serbian comedy rock band the Kuguars, composed of renowned Serbian actors, achieved widespread popularity with their 1998 cover of the song "Dejo majstore." Originally dedicated to the Yugoslav national association football team player Dejan "Dejo" Savićević, the song's lyrics were in Serbian. This rendition quickly became a nationwide hit, garnering significant attention. Additionally, a promotional video was produced to accompany the song's release, further solidifying its status within the Serbian music scene.
- In their 1994 album, the comedy music group Grup Vitamin included a Turkish cover of the song parodying the macho culture in the country.
- In 1988–89, Belafonte's children, David and Gina, parodied the song in a commercial about the Oldsmobile Toronado Trofeo. (David was singing "Trofeo" in the same style as "Day-O" in the song).
- A 1991 Brazilian commercial used a parody of the song to promote their bubble gum brand "Bubbaloo Banana" with lyrics dedicated to the banana-flavoured candy
- A 1991 Taiwanese commercial of Luyou apricot kernel drink (綠友杏仁茶) parodied the song with lyrics dedicated to the apricot kernel drink, sung by Lee Mao-shan. The song was also released in its full version titled "Tê-Ooh" (茶噢).
- A parody of this song was used in an E-Trade commercial that first aired on Super Bowl LII in 2018.
- Biscuit manufacturer Jacob's parodied the song in the 1980s for advertisements for the Trio biscuit bar, sung by an animated character called Suzy.
- Food manufacturer Kellogg's parodied the song in their 2001 television advertisement for their breakfast cereal Fruit 'n Fibre.
- For an ad campaign that started in 1991, now-defunct Seattle-based department store chain The Bon Marché used a version of the song with alternate lyrics in their commercials.
- The Swedish humor show Rally, which aired between 1995 and 2002 on Sveriges Radio P3 made a version called "Hey Mr. Taliban", which speaks about Osama bin Laden.
- "The Rockin Roll Morning Show" on KOMP 92.3 created a flash video called "Osama bin Laden Nowhere To Run - Nowhere To Hide" that features United States Secretary of State Colin Powell (who was himself of Jamaican descent) singing a parody of the song about Osama bin Laden getting bombed, while U.S. President George W. Bush plays a drum in front of the White House.
- In November 2019, The Late Show with Stephen Colbert modified the lyrics to make fun of Mike Pompeo, saying "Pompe-O, Pompe-O. Hearing come and I wanna go home."
- In 2023, a Turkish YouTube channel for kids produced a version for small children, about how to remember where they left their belongings, which reached about 40 million views.
- In 2024, the Filipino reggae band, Tropavibes, released May Sinde. The parody lyrics describe the experience of cannabis use.
- Many videos indicate the lyrics 'six feet, seven feet, eight feet, bunch' while a few videos do reference 'six hand, seven hand, eight hand, bunch'. More formall each 'Bunch" is formed by 'Hands' of bananas. Groups of bananas on the stem are considered a “bunch”, each group of bananas growing together attached to the stem would be a “hand,” resulting in a single or individual banana as a “finger".

== Samples and interpolations ==
- Chilean program 31 minutos used the song "Arwrarwrirwrarwro" by Bombi which was based on "Day-O (The Banana Boat Song)".
- TV3's one of the TV shows called Jalan Jalan Cari Makan (Malay: Go Out for a Food Trip) uses this song as an interpolation
- Jason Derulo's 2011 song "Don't Wanna Go Home" from his album Future History heavily samples "Day-O (The Banana Boat Song)".
- Lil Wayne's 2010 song "6 Foot 7 Foot" (featuring Cory Gunz) from his album Tha Carter IV samples and derives its title from "Day-O (The Banana Boat Song)".
- The Conkarah song "Banana", released in 2019 by S-Curve Records, with contributions from Shaggy, samples largely and is an adaptation of the Harry Belafonte original.

== In media and politics ==
- The original 1956 Belafonte recording is heard in the 1988 film Beetlejuice in a dinner scene in which the guests are supernaturally compelled to dance along to the song by the film's protagonists. It was sung by Beetlejuice (Stephen Ouimette) and Lydia Deetz (Alyson Court) in "Critter Sitters" the first episode of the animated television series in 1989, and it appeared in the 2019 Broadway musical adaptation. It also appeared in the original film's 2024 sequel Beetlejuice Beetlejuice, where the song is performed by a children's choir.
- On season 3, episode 14 of the TV series The Muppet Show in 1979, Harry Belafonte performs the song accompanied by Fozzie Bear (Frank Oz) and other Muppets. Fozzie requests to be a tally man as identified in the lyrics of the song. Belafonte explains what a tally man is as he proceeds to sing with other Muppets accompanying singing the song's answer.
- In the TV series Legends of Tomorrow season 2 episode 14 "Moonshot" in 2017, the character Martin Stein (Victor Garber) abruptly starts singing the song to cause a distraction.
- During the first leg of the thirty-second season of the American version of The Amazing Race, contestants had to play a section of the song on a steelpan during a Roadblock challenge.
- In the Justin Trudeau blackface controversy, on 18 September 2019, Justin Trudeau, the Prime Minister of Canada, admitted to singing "Day-O" while wearing blackface makeup and an afro wig at a talent show when he was in high school at Collège Jean-de-Brébeuf.
- In the 2024 Swedish documentary film The Last Journey, Filip Hammar's father Lars Hammar listened to the song during his younger days and loved to tell a story about Harry Belafonte among his friends. The song was also featured in the film during one of the scenes.

== Charts ==
The Tarriers' "Banana Boat" peaked at #8 on 9 January 1957. Harry Belafonte's "Banana Boat (Day-O)" peaked at #5 on 20 February 1957.

== Certifications and sales ==
Region	Certification	Certified units/sales
Italy	—	370,000
New Zealand (RMNZ)	Gold	15,000^{‡}
^{‡} Sales+streaming figures based on certification alone.
