= Frantz Casseus =

Haitian-American guitarist and composer

Frantz Casseus (14 December 1915 – 3 June 1993) was a Haitian-American guitarist and composer.

Born and raised in Port-au-Prince, Haiti, he spent most of his adult life in the United States where he immigrated in 1946 hoping to meet pianist Fats Waller. Though influenced by jazz and European classical music, Casseus's compositions maintained a focus on Haitian folk forms, which he incorporated into his recordings and his published compositions. Casseus was a frequent collaborator with Harry Belafonte who recorded his song "Merci Bon Dieu". Casseus played on Belafonte's breakthrough album Calypso. Between 1953 and 1969, Casseus recorded three albums for Smithsonian Folkways. Casseus wrote music until the last years of his life, but from the 1970s tendonitis in his left hand curtailed his performance and recording career.

Casseus was an early guitar teacher to the American musician Marc Ribot (b. 1954), whose aunt and uncle were friends of Casseus. Ribot has played a significant role in preserving Casseus' musical legacy. As part of these efforts, Ribot edited a collection of Casseus' solo guitar compositions, and performed those same pieces on a CD issued in 1993.

== Discography ==
- Haitian Folks Songs Smithsonian Folkways Recordings (1953); duets with singer Lolita Cuevas
- Haitian Dances Smithsonian Folkways Recordings (1954); solo guitar
- Haitiana Smithsonian Folkways Recordings (Afro-Carib) (1969); duets with singer Barbara Perlow
- Marc Ribot Plays Solo Guitar Works of Frantz Casseus, Les Disques du Crépuscule (1993); solo guitar pieces performed by Marc Ribot
