= Jamaica Farewell =

1956 song performed by Harry Belafonte

Song by Harry Belafonte

from the album Calypso
- Language: English
- Released: 1956
- Genre: Mento
- Songwriter: Irving Burgie

"Jamaica Farewell" is a Jamaican-style folk song (mento). The lyrics for the song were written by Lord Burgess (Irving Burgie), an American-born, half-Barbadian songwriter. It is about the beauties of the West Indian Islands.

== Harry Belafonte recording ==
The song appeared on Harry Belafonte's 1956 album Calypso. It was also released as a single. It reached number 14 on the Billboard Pop chart.

== Background ==
Many, including Belafonte himself, have said that the song was popular in the West Indies since long before Lord Burgess. It is believed that Burgess compiled and modified the song from many folk pieces to make a new song. Burgess acknowledged his use of the tune of another mento, "Iron Bar". The line "ackee, rice, saltfish are nice" refers to the Jamaican national dish.

== Covers ==
Artists who have covered "Jamaica Farewell" include:

- Chuck Berry (feat. The Five Dimensions), on his 1965 album Chuck Berry in London.
- Sir Lancelot
- Marty Robbins
- Don Williams, on his 1990 album True Love.
- Jimmy Buffett, on his 1990 live album Feeding Frenzy: Jimmy Buffett Live!
- Sam Cooke, on his 1960 album Cooke's Tour.
- Nina & Frederik, on their self-titled 1957 album.
- Carly Simon, on her 2007 album Into White.
- Laura Veirs, on her 2011 album Tumble Bee.
- Caetano Veloso, on his 2004 album A Foreign Sound.
- Sting, while playing a medley of his own "Can't Stand Losing You / Reggatta de Blanc" while still with The Police in 1983.
- Carleton "Bill" Bailey, on the album Cruising with Bill Bailey (recorded while on board MS Southward) (1960).
- Ray Conniff Orchestra, on the album Happiness Is (1966).
- James Last Orchestra, on the album Music From Across The Way (1971).
- The Jukebox Band, on the TV show Shining Time Station, episode "Bully for Mr. Conductor" in 1993.
- Austrian pop singer Chris Denning (alias Helmut Rulofs) in 1978
- Desmond Dekker, on his 1999 album Halfway to Paradise.
- Lil Ugly Mane, in a section of "Side Two-A" on his 2015 mixtape Third Side of Tape.
- Robin Cook, on his 1997 album Land of Sunshine.
- Fisherman's Friends, on the album Sole Mates.
- The Kingston Trio, who led the folk revival of the late 1950s, took their name from the mention of Kingston, Jamaica in the song; though their recording of the song was not released until their 1997 compilation album The Kingston Trio: The Guard Years and later live version appearing on their 2006 live album Live! at the Historic Yuma Theater.
- Nancy Cassidy, on her 1986 children's music album Kids' Songs.
- Dom La Nena and Rosemary Standley as Birds on a Wire, on their self-titled 2014 album.
- Bob James on his 1976 album Three, an instrumental smooth jazz version

=== In other languages ===
This song has been translated into many languages. For example, in Bengali, there exist several translations, some of which are quite well known. One Bengali version of the song became an important anthem for the Naxalite revolutionary movement in the 1970s and thus has significance for Bengali intellectuals in Kolkata society. The Bangladeshi band Souls also sang their own translated version in early 1990s, which instantly became a hit in Bangladesh.

The song "Iron bar" was published along with Swedish lyrics by Ulf Peder Olrog in 1947 as "Mera bruk i baljan boys" in his "Rosenblom i Västindien" sheet music album. Olrog had earlier in 1947 travelled in the West Indies and wrote down some "native songs" in Jamaica, of which 3 were published with Swedish lyrics. The song was a large record hit with singer Anders Börje. Later on, "Jamaica Farewell" was covered with lyrics in Swedish by Schytts as "Jamaica farväl", scoring a 1979 Svensktoppen hit. Streaplers recorded a 1967 Swedish-language version of the song, with the lyrics "Långt långt bort". Their version became a 1968 Svensktoppen hit.

German translations are "Abschied von Kingston Town" ("Farewell from Kingston Town") by Bruce Low and "Weil der Sommer ein Winter war" ("For the Summer was a Winter") by Nana Mouskouri. The Vietnamese translation is "Lời Yêu Thương" ("Love Words") by Đức Huy.

== Parodies ==
- In his 1962 album My Son, the Folk Singer, Allan Sherman included a parody of the song on "Shticks and Stones": "I'm upside down, my head is spinning around, because I gotta sell the house in Levittown!"
- A filk music parody "Change at Jamaica Farewell" makes fun of the Long Island Rail Road.

== Soundtrack appearances ==
This song was featured in the 2009 video game, Rabbids Go Home, at numerous points in the game. It further was featured in "Chapter Eight: Know Your Truth", episode 8 of season 1 of the TV series, Barry in 2018.

== See also ==
- Hymn tune
- Long metre
- Kingston Town (song)
