= Irving Burgie =

American Caribbean music composer (1924–2019)

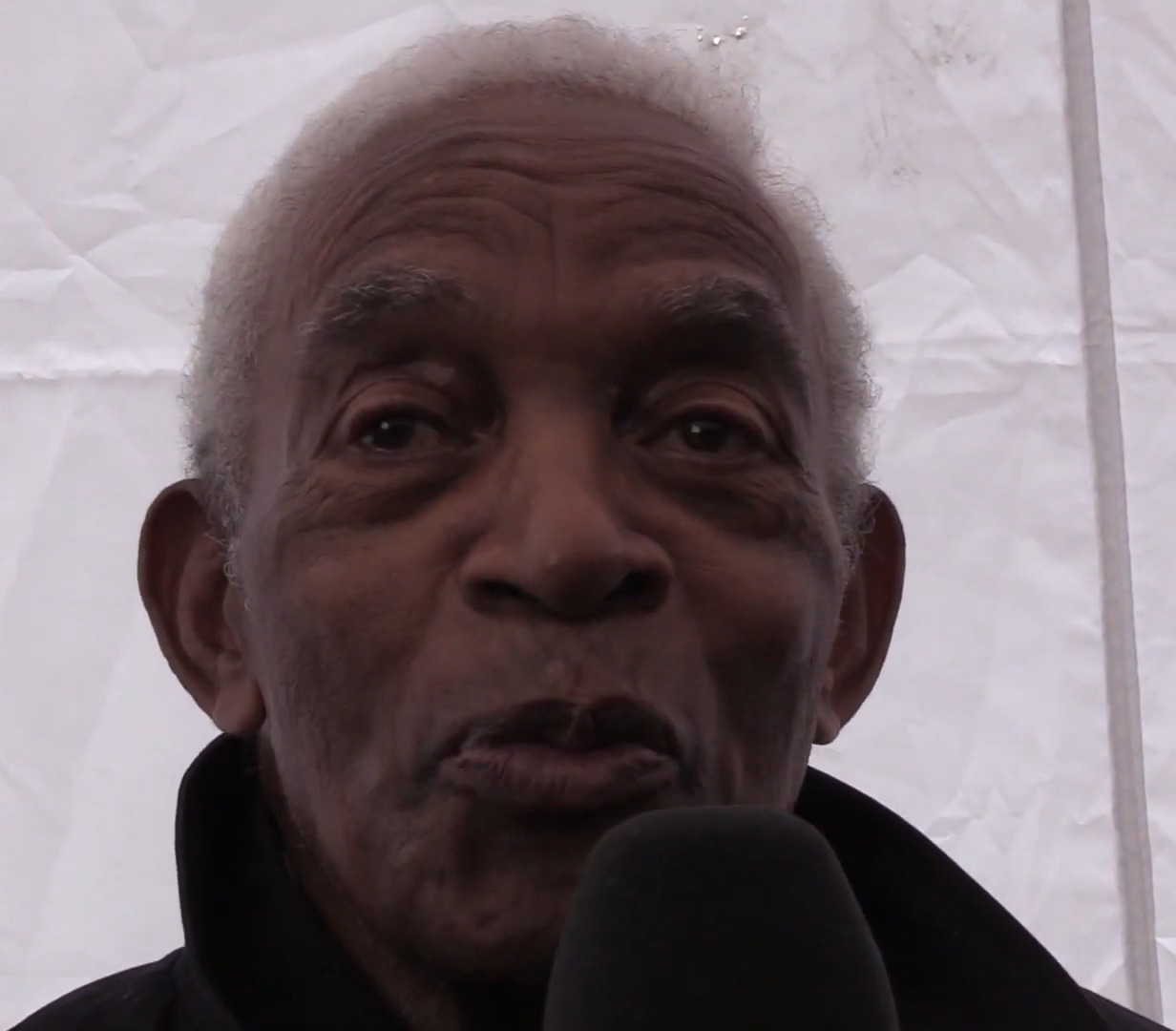
- Burgie at an interview

Background information
- Also known as: Lord Burgess; Irving Burgess
- Born: Irving Louis Burgie; July 28, 1924; Brooklyn, New York, U.S.
- Died: November 29, 2019 (aged 95) Queens, New York City, U.S.
- Genres: Folk music, calypso
- Occupations: Singer, songwriter

Irving Louis Burgie (July 28, 1924 – November 29, 2019), sometimes known professionally as Lord Burgess, was an American musician and songwriter, regarded as one of the greatest composers of Caribbean music. He composed 34 songs for Harry Belafonte, including eight of the 11 songs on the Belafonte album Calypso (1956), the first album of any kind to sell one million copies. Burgie also wrote the lyrics of the National Anthem of Barbados. To date, songs penned by Irving Burgie have sold more than 100 million copies worldwide.

== Biography ==
Burgie was born in Brooklyn, New York. His mother was from Barbados and his father was from Virginia. Burgie joined the U.S. Army in World War II, and served in Burma, China and India, where he started playing guitar and singing. After the war, he studied at the Juilliard School and met Harry Belafonte in 1950. Using the name Lord Burgess, he began singing and playing guitar in New York City clubs, developing a repertoire based around songs from the Caribbean that he had learned as a child or collected in visits to the area.

After he performed as Lord Burgess in the Village Vanguard in 1954, and released an album, Lord Burgess' Calypso Serenaders (aka Folk Songs of Haiti, Jamaica and Trinidad) on Stinson Records, a mutual friend, William Attaway, suggested that Burgie write songs for Belafonte. Burgie and Attaway wrote a version of the lyrics for the "Day-O (The Banana Boat Song)" for the Colgate Comedy Hour, and it was then recorded by Belafonte for RCA Victor. This is the recording that is by far the best known to listeners today, as it reached number five on the Billboard charts in 1957 and later became his signature song.

Burgie and Attaway composed eight of the songs on Belafonte's 1956 album Calypso, including "Day-O"' and "Jamaica Farewell". "Day-O" was a traditional Jamaican song that was sung by dock workers who worked throughout the night loading bananas onto ships. Belafonte's version used lyrics adapted by Burgie and Attaway, though Belafonte is also credited. Burgie later described "Day-O" as "a song about struggle, about black people in a colonized life doing the most grueling work", saying "a lot of my work is based on songs and ditties that I've heard in the Caribbean". The song "Jamaica Farewell" was later recorded by Jimmy Buffett, Carly Simon, and others.

Belafonte recorded other songs written by Burgie, including "Island in the Sun", one of ten Burgie compositions on his 1957 album Belafonte Sings of the Caribbean. Burgie also wrote eight of the twelve tracks on Belafonte's 1961 album Jump Up Calypso and also wrote "Can't Cross Over" and co-wrote "Goin' Down Jordan" on Belafonte's 1977 album Turn the World Around.

Burgie set up his own publishing company. By the late 1950s, he was able to live comfortably off the royalties he received, and in 1960 he funded a magazine in Harlem, The Urbanite. He also helped finance civil rights activists. He wrote the music and lyrics for the 1963 off-Broadway musical Ballad for Bimshire and also co-wrote the book with Loften Mitchell. The show opened at the Mayfair Theater on October 15 and ran for 74 performances. Burgie also wrote the lyrics for the national anthem of Barbados, "In Plenty and In Time of Need", adopted in 1966 at the time of the island's independence.

Burgie performed rarely after his initial success but did appear in the early 1980s at venues including Gerde's Folk City. In 1996, the album Island in the Sun: The Songs of Irving Burgie was released, followed by The Father of Modern Calypso in 2003.

He was inducted into the Songwriters Hall of Fame in 2007. His life story was recorded in the book Day-O!!! The Autobiography of Irving Burgie (2007).

Burgie died on November 29, 2019, at the age of 95, from heart failure, at his home in Queens, New York. His death was announced by Barbados' Prime Minister Mia Amor Mottley at the nation's Independence Day Parade.

== Discography ==
- Lord Burgess' Calypso Serenaders - Folk Songs of Haiti, Jamaica and Trinidad (Stinson SLP 62, 1954)
- Ballad For Bimshire. A New Musical of Barbados (London AM 48002, 1963)
- Lord Burgess and his Sun Islanders - Calypso Go Go (Buddah BDS 5005, 1967)
- Lord Burgess Rides Again (Cherry Lane CLR-1-1984, 1984)
- Island in the Sun: The Songs of Irving Burgie (Angel 52222, 1996)
- The Father Of Modern Calypso (VLT-15170, 2003)
