= William Attaway =

American writer (1911–1986)

- Born: William Alexander Attaway; November 19, 1911; Greenville, Mississippi; United States
- Died: June 17, 1986 (aged 74); Los Angeles, California, United States
- Occupations: Novelist, short story writer, essayist
- Writing career
- Period: 1935–1967
- Genre: Proletarian literature
- Notable works: Blood on the Forge, "Banana Boat Song"

William Alexander Attaway (November 19, 1911 – June 17, 1986) was an African-American novelist, short story writer, essayist, songwriter, playwright, and screenwriter. He was known for his novel Blood on the Forge, which highlights the issues faced by African Americans who migrated from the rural South to the North, during a period known as the Great Migration. He was active in the Civil Rights movement and wrote for radio and television.

== Biography ==
=== Early life ===
Attaway was born on November 19, 1911, in Greenville, Mississippi, the son of W. A. Attaway, a physician and founder of the National Negro Insurance Association, and Florence Parry Attaway, a school teacher. When Attaway was six, he moved with his family to Chicago, Illinois, as part of the Great Migration, to escape the segregated South.

=== Education ===
In Chicago, Attaway showed little interest in school until he was assigned a poem written by Langston Hughes. Once he learned that Hughes was a black poet, Attaway decided to start applying himself to his school work. He even enjoyed writing so much that he wrote for his sister Ruth's amateur dramatic groups.

After graduating from high school, Attaway enrolled at the University of Illinois Urbana–Champaign. There, he was a tennis college champion. Even though he was doing well at college, upon his father's death Attaway dropped out and became a traveling worker for two years. During these years he worked as a salesman, a labor organizer, and a seaman, and began to collect material for his later works.

After getting his B.A. (1936) from the University of Illinois and having published "The Tale of the Blackamoor" in Challenge, he traveled around the US before settling into New York City.

=== Family and personal life ===
Attaway was married in 1962 to a woman named Frances Settele. They lived in Barbados for eleven years with their two children, Bill and Noelle. Frances Attaway was a white woman originally from New York. They had a 20-years courtship before going public and official with their union. Frances and William moved their family to the Caribbean to escape racial turmoil and death threats.

William Attaway's daughter, Noelle, recalls records of Martin Luther King Jr. calling William Attaway "a fellow freedom fighter" and both marched side by side during the civil rights movement. He took part in the March 7, 1965 Bloody Sunday voting rights demonstrations in Selma, Alabama.

=== Death ===
During his last years, Attaway lived in Berkeley and then Los Angeles, California. He was working on a screenplay for The Atlanta Child Murders television series when he suffered a heart attack. He died on June 17, 1986, of heart failure, aged 74.

== Literary career ==
In 1935, Attaway began working on his first project as he helped to write the Federal Writers' Project guide to Illinois. While he was working on this project he became good friends with Richard Wright, another soon-to-be-famous novelist. After his first project was over, Attaway returned to the University of Illinois and received his degree. He then moved to New York, where his drama Carnival was produced.

His first short story, "Tale of the Blackamoor", was published in 1936. In between works, he worked many odd jobs and even tried acting with his sister Ruth. Ruth later became a successful Broadway actress, and she ultimately helped to fuel Attaway's career. In 1939, Attaway's first novel, Let Me Breathe Thunder, was published. He received a two year grant from the Rosenwald Fund which enabled him to write Blood on the Forge, published in 1941.

After Blood on the Forge, Attaway began to write songs, screenplays, and books about music. His main works include Calypso Song Book and Hear America Singing. Attaway and Irving Burgie co-wrote the famous song "Day-O" ("Banana Boat Song") for calypso singer Harry Belafonte. In the 1950s, Attaway began to write for radio, TV, and films. He was the first African American to write scripts for film and TV. He wrote for programs such as Wide Wide World and Colgate Hour.

Despite having published works approved by critics, Attaway's work never gained the mainstream fame enjoyed by some other African-American authors, for example Richard Wright, whose novel Native Son was published in 1940.

== Popular music ==
=== Calypso Song Book ===
In Calypso Song Book, Attaway describes "Calypso, the Western Indian music, is enjoying a great revival among all sorts of music lovers, from serious students of folk music to sophisticated night-club and theater audiences and followers of the Hit Parade." Attaway further explains that "Calypso can be divided into two categories: the bracket form, for bouncy ditties that are mostly nonsense, and the ballade, the most common form for serious topics." However, Attaway admits "the humorous twist is a necessary part of any true Calypso song." Each song not only has sheet music in Calypso Song Book, but it also has a brief narration, except two songs, right next to the title which is provided by Attaway and an illustration by William Charmatz.

=== Hear America Singing ===
George P. Weick in Harlem Renaissance Lives points out that in 1967, Attaway published for children a compilation of representative popular music in America, including historical commentary, Hear America Singing. Harry Belafonte in the Hear America Singing introduction writes the folk singing is no longer a spectator sport—it is an essential part of growing up. Folk music is just exactly what it claims to be—the music of the people; not of individuals, but all the people. Belafonte continues the term "folk" was originally applied only to the peasants and farmers of the Old World, who had never learned to read or write. The evolution of democracy slowly expanded the meaning of the world until it came to stand for all proud and common people.

In Chapter Four – We Were Always Growing, Attaway describes one of the songs—Always "Greensleeves"—as following. The folk song, as rule, is always in the process of change. But every rule has its exceptions. This was the one folk song that survived all the centuries, practically untouched. It had come down from Elizabethan England to present-day America without being rewritten. Attaway further expresses although its subject matter was romantic love, it remained a favorite of both Pilgrims and Puritans. The frontiersmen also learned this song, as nearly as they could, in its original form. It was simply too beautiful to change.

== Script writing ==
According to Harlem Renaissance Lives, Attaway's sister, Ruth, helped him to enter the theater world and he also performed in several productions, including a 1939 traveling production of George S. Kaufman's You Can't Take it With You. (PP 23) One Hundred Years of Laughter, a television special on black humor, was one of his most important scripts that was airing in 1966. Attaway is also credited as the screenwriter for the 1981 race-relations TV movie Grambling's White Tiger, directed by Roots actor Georg Stanford Brown.

== Works ==
=== Literature ===
- Carnival (1935)
- Let Me Breathe Thunder (1939)
- Blood on the Forge (1941)
- Calypso Song Book (1957)
- Hear America Singing (nonfiction) (1967)
- From These Hills, From These Valleys: Selected Fiction About Western Pennsylvania. (Some of Attaways works were featured in the collection despite not being the main and only author)

== Style and themes ==
=== Racial and ecological crisis ===
William Attaway often kept the main themes of his writing about racial and ecological crisis, especially in his novel Blood on the Forge. In Blood on the Forge, Attaway depicts the hardship of the black community during The Great Migration, which Attaway experienced firsthand when his family moved to Chicago, Illinois, in 1916. Blood on the Forge uses the lives of three brothers to describe the battle that the African-American community went through in order to achieve acceptance and equality. His vivid portrayal of The Great Migration gives the reader an honest insight into the struggles of the African-American community as they moved out of the Southern United States fighting for a better life that they weren't necessarily guaranteed.

=== Death of the blues ===
By focusing on the experiences of the Moss brothers in Blood on the Forge, Attaway effectively dramatizes the loss of the folk culture which accompanied the Great Migration of Black people from the rural South to the industrial North, in this case the steel mills of Pennsylvania, around the time of World War I. Though an involved system of symbolic characterization and imagery, Attaway weaves an intricate examination of what might be called the death of the blues—at least the blues as representative of the folk culture.

== Legacy ==
Attaway's literary legacy rests primarily with his novel Blood on the Forge, which has been called the finest depiction of the Great Migration era in American literature. Attaway retains an important place among African-American writers of the early 20th century; the reprinting of Blood on the Forge in 1993 has brought renewed critical and popular attention to his writing.

== Papers ==
- Letters from Attaway, University of California at Berkeley
- Page proofs, Schomburg Center for Research in Black Culture In NY, NY.
