= Strings and Things =

Studio album by Jack Pleis, His Piano, Chorus and Orchestra
- Released: 1957
- Genre: Popular music
- Label: Decca

Jack Pleis, His Piano, Chorus and Orchestra chronology
Broadway Goes Hollywood	Strings and Things	Serenades to Remember

Strings and Things is a 1957 album by Jack Pleis (credited as Jack Pleis, His Piano, Chorus and Orchestra). The title song and two other songs were composed by Pleis.

== Background ==
Jack Pleis (1917–1990) was an American jazz pianist, arranger, conductor, composer and producer. Prior to World War II, he had been one of Jan Savitt's "Top Hatters". After serving in the war, he worked several years at London Records, moving to Decca in 1953, where he and his orchestra initially backed other artists including his wife Karen Chandler, The Four Aces, Eileen Barton, Teresa Brewer, and the Dinning Sisters. He went on to release a number of records, releasing seven albums of his own between 1955 and 1976, of which this is the third. He also arranged and produced many songs and albums for other artists.

== Critical reception ==
Billboard gave a favorable review, calling it "a set of delightful arrangements ... with subtle piano naturally in the ascendent," also writing, "Pleis makes effective use of choral arrangements over an almost symphonic pattern. ... Great deejay material."

The Ottawa Citizen listed it as #4 on CKCH deejay Gilbert Herard's album playlist in its "DJ's Choice Of Ten Top Tunes" feature.

== Track listing ==
Jack Pleis, His Piano, Chorus and Orchestra (1957). Strings and Things (LP). Decca. DL 8422.

No.	Title	Writer(s)	Length
1.	"Frenchman In St. Louis"		3:01
2.	"The Waltz Of Tears"
3.	"For Always"
4.	"Mr. Peepers"
5.	"A Catchy Tune"
6.	"Beyond The Blue Horizon"	Robin/Whiting/Harling
7.	"I'll Always Be In Love With You"
8.	"Paris Loves Lovers"
9.	"Theme from The Story of Three Loves, The Eighteenth Variation"	Miklós Rózsa
10.	"Todd"
11.	"Strings And Things"	Jack Pleis
12.	"Pagan In Paris"		2:51
