= Music from Disneyland =

Studio album by Jack Pleis and His Orchestra and Chorus
- Released: 1955
- Genre: Children's, popular music
- Label: Decca

Jack Pleis and His Orchestra and Chorus chronology
Music from Disneyland	Broadway Goes Hollywood

Music from Disneyland is the 1955 debut album of Jack Pleis (credited as Jack Pleis and His Orchestra and Chorus). It covers twelve popular songs from Walt Disney films.

== Background ==
Jack Pleis (1917–1990) was an American jazz pianist, arranger, conductor, composer and producer. Prior to the release of this album, he had been one of Jan Savitt's "Top Hatters". After serving in World War II, he worked several years at London Records, moving to Decca in 1953, where he and his orchestra initially backed other artists including his wife Karen Chandler, The Four Aces, Eileen Barton, Teresa Brewer, and the Dinning Sisters. He had released several singles prior to releasing this album.

== Critical reception ==
Billboard wrote that "the contents are styled along pop-lines, with Pleis and a vocal chorus contributing relaxed, danceable treatments of [...] memorable Disney songs.

The Daily Herald called the album an "abundantly joyful package of music", writing further that "Jack Pleis, his orchestra and chorus blend wonderfully on a dozen selections of memorable Disney songs", and concluding that it was "delightful listening for all ages."

== Track listing ==
Jack Pleis and His Orchestra and Chorus (1955). Music from Disneyland (LP). Decca. DL 8105.

No.	Title	Writer(s)	Length
1.	"When You Wish Upon a Star"	Leigh Harline/Ned Washington	2:56
2.	"Heigh-Ho - Whistle While You Work"	Frank Churchill/Larry Morey	2:47
3.	"Someday My Prince Will Come" ("Some Day I'll Find My Love")	Frank Churchill/Larry Morey	2:45
4.	"Baía"	Ary Barroso/Ray Gilbert	3:27
5.	"Who's Afraid of the Big Bad Wolf?"	Frank Churchill/Ann Ronell	3:00
6.	"Bibbidi-Bobbidi-Boo" ("The Magic Song")	Al Hoffman/Jerry Livingston/Mack David	2:34
7.	"A Dream Is a Wish Your Heart Makes"	Al Hoffman/Jerry Livingston/Mack David	2:44
8.	"Lavender Blue" ("Dilly, Dilly")	Traditional	2:44
9.	"Melody Time"	George David Weiss/Bennie Benjamin	2:59
10.	"You Belong to My Heart"	Agustín Lara/Ray Gilbert	3:00
11.	"Love Is a Song"	Frank Churchill/Larry Morey	3:18
12.	"Zip-a-Dee-Doo-Dah"	Allie Wrubel/Ray Gilbert	2:21
