= Play Me (Harry Belafonte album) =

Studio album by Harry Belafonte
- Released: 1973
- Recorded: RCA Studios B and C, New York City
- Genre: Pop
- Label: RCA Victor
- Producer: Jack Pleis

Harry Belafonte chronology
Belafonte...Live! (1972)	Play Me (1973)	Belafonte Concert in Japan (1974)

Professional ratings
Review scores
Source	Rating
Allmusic	2.5/5 stars

Play Me is an album by Harry Belafonte, released in 1973. It was his final studio album for RCA Records and his last studio album until 1977's Turn the World Around released by Columbia Records.

== Track listing ==
1. "Play Me" (Neil Diamond) – 4:07
2. "And I Love You So" (Don McLean) – 4:37
  - Guitar solo by David Spinozza
3. "Mr. Wiffen" (D. Wiffen) – 3:30
4. "If Only It Were Yesterday" (G. Sklerov) – 4:38
  - Guitar solo by David Spinozza
5. "So Close" (Jake Holmes) – 4:09
  - Duet with Eloise Laws
6. "Empty Chairs" (Don McLean) – 5:17
  - Guitar solo by Jay Berliner
7. "Morningside (For the Children)" (Neil Diamond) – 4:11
  - Children's Chorus: The Meri Mini Players
8. "My Old Man" (Jerry Jeff Walker) – 4:31
9. "One Step" (K. Dunman) – 3:40
10. "Long Long Time" (G. White) – 5:13
  - Duet with Eloise Laws

== Personnel ==
- Harry Belafonte – vocals
- Eloise Laws – vocals on "So Close" and "Long Long Time" (photo featured on back of LP sleeve)
- Jay Berliner – guitar
- David Spinozza – guitar
- The Meri Mini Players Children's Chorus – vocals

Production notes

- Jack Pleis – producer
- John Cartwright – associate producer, musical director
- Robert Freedman – arrangements
- Coleridge-Taylor Perkinson – arrangements
- Ed Begley – engineer
- Jim Crotty – engineer
- Mae Cann – cover art

The album was mixed and prepared to be released in Quadraphonic, 4-channel formats but for unknown reasons remains unreleased.
