= The Soul Brothers =

South African music group

Soul Brothers
- Also known as: Young Brothers (1970s); The Soul Brothers
- Origin: KwaZulu-Natal, South Africa
- Genres: Mbaqanga; folk; country; RnB; soul
- Instrument: Hammond
- Years active: 1974–present
- Labels: Gallo Record Company (former); Soul Brothers Records (Pty) Ltd
- Members: Black Moses Ngwenya; David Masondo; Zenzele Zakes Mchunu; Tuza Mthethwa; Themba American Zulu; Maxwell China Mngadi

The Soul Brothers is a South African Mbaqanga music group from KwaZulu-Natal formed in 1975 by Moses Ngwenya and David Masondo. They have released more than 45 albums, including two solo albums by lead vocalist David Masondo with one featuring Deborah Fraser, most of which were certified as gold status by the Recording Industry of South Africa. In total, the band has sold more than five million copies of their albums.

In 2001, the band won a South Africa Music Award for the song "Intombi Yami". In 2011, the band won the South Africa Music Award for best Mbaqanga album. In early 1976, the band released a single, "Mshoza Wami", that sold more than 60,000 units within three months, a rare achievement in the Mbhaqanga music genre. The band has played in many countries and has collaborated with many other artists including the legendary Harry Belafonte on his 1988 album “Paradise in Gazankulu”.

Masondo released two solo albums before his death in 2015. One included a collaboration with Deborah Fraser, on the song "Umzal’wam".

In 2018, at the age of 69, Skhumbuzo Mabaso died after a short illness.

== Band members ==
- Zenzele “Zakes” Mchunu (bass, 1974–1984; died 1984)
- David Masondo (drums, lead vocals 1974–2015; died 2015)
- Tuza Mthethwa (lead guitar, 1974–1979; died 1979)
- Moses Ngwenya (organ and synthesizers, 1976–present)
- Themba “American” Zulu (rhythm guitar and backing vocals, 1976–1982; died 1992)
- Maxwell Mngadi (lead guitar, 1985–2022; died 2022)
- Sicelo Ndlela (bass, 1985–2024; died 2024)
- Thomas Phale (saxophone, 1985–2002; died 2002)
- Bongani Nxele (drums, 1979-2002; died 2002)
- Skhumbuzo Mabaso (lead guitar 1983-1985; died 2018)

== International performances ==
- United Kingdom (1990)
- Europe

== Discography ==
=== Studio albums ===
- Mshoza Wami (1977)
- I Feel So Lonely Without You (1977)
- Dumela (1977)
- Mantombanzane (1978)
- Aye Niyeke Botsotsi (1978)
- Deliwe (1979)
- Kulukhuni (1979)
- Ke Kopa Tshwarelo (1980)
- Nilindeni (1980)
- Ukhalelani (1980)
- uSathane Simehlulile (1981)
- Isiphiwo (1982)
- Isicelo (1983)
- Isithembiso (1984)
- Isilingo (1985)
- Uthando (1986)
- Xola (1987)
- Usibali (1988)
- Jive Explosion (Earthworks, 1988)
- Impimpi (1989)
- Umhlola (1990)
- Hluphekile (1991)
- Uxolo (1992)
- Vala Umlomo (1993)
- Jump and Jive (1994)
- Isigebengu (1995)
- Indaba (1995)
- Umshado (1996)
- Idlozi (1997)
- Amanikiniki (1998)
- Isigqebhezana (1999)
- Induk’Enhle (2001)
- Rough Guide to the Soul Brothers (2001)
- Isithothobala (2002)
- Kuze Kuse (2003)
- Igobondela (2004)
- Kings of Mbaqanga: Live in Johannesburg (2005)
- Into Yamahala (2006)
- Amacala (2007)
- Unembeza (2008)
- Oganda Ganda Vol. 2 (2009)
- Thul'Ubheke (2010)
- Amaphutha (2011)
- Isiphithiphithi (2012)
- Dlal'ngam (solo album, David Masondo; 2014)
- Iqiniso (2021)
- Hamba Naye (2023)
- Thath' Owakho (2025)

== Awards and nominations ==
Year	Award ceremony	Prize	Result	Ref.
2001	South Africa Music Awards	"Intombi Yam"	Won	
2008	South Africa Music Awards	"Macala"	Nominated	
2011	South Africa Music Awards	Best Mbaqanga Album	Won	
2024	South Africa Music Awards	Best Traditional Music Album	Won	
