= Belafonte...Live! =

Live album by Harry Belafonte
- Released: 1972
- Recorded: 1972
- Venue: O'Keefe Centre, Toronto, Ontario, Canada
- Genre: Pop
- Label: RCA Victor
- Producer: Jack Pleis, John Cartwright

Harry Belafonte chronology
Calypso Carnival (1971)	Belafonte...Live! (1972)	Play Me (1973)

Professional ratings
Review scores
Source	Rating
Allmusic	4/5 stars

Belafonte...Live! is a live double album by Harry Belafonte, released by RCA Records in 1972.

== Track listing ==
1. "Look Over Yonder/Be My Woman, Gal" – 6:16
2. "Mr. Bojangles" (Jerry Jeff Walker) – 5:16
3. "Suzanne" (Leonard Cohen) – 6:18
4. "Pastures of Plenty" (Woody Guthrie) – 4:47
5. "Wedding Song" (Paul Stookey) – 4:20
6. "Mahlalela" – 4:30
7. "Nonqonqo" – 3:00
8. "Mamani" – 5:15
9. "Qonqoza" – 3:03
10. "Out de Fire" – 11:33
11. "Brother Moses" – 2:28
12. "Someone Is Standin' Outside" – 3:55
13. "Oh Brother" – 3:47
14. "Carnival Medley:" – 17:20
  1. "Don't Stop the Carnival"
  2. "Jean and Dinah"
  3. "Mama Look a Boo-Boo"
  4. "Jump In the Line"
  5. "Marianne"
  6. "Sly Mongoose"
  7. "Zombie Jamboree"
15. "Abraham, Martin & John" (Dick Holler) – 5:02

== Personnel ==
- Harry Belafonte – vocals
- Letta Mbulu – vocals on "Mahlalela", "Nonqonqo", "Mamani", "Qonqoza"
- Ella Mitchell – vocals on "Brother Moses", "Someone Is Standin' Outside", "Oh Brother"
- Sivuca – vocals, accordion on "Carnival Medley"
- The Howard Roberts Chorale – vocals

Production notes:

- Jack Pleis – producer
- John Cartwright – producer, musical director
- Jack Feeney – executive producer
- George Semkiw – engineer
- Bob Simpson – engineer
- Hayward Parrott – engineer
- Paul Emile Mongeau – engineer
- Ron Evans – liner notes
