= Paradise in Gazankulu =

Studio album by Harry Belafonte
- Released: 1988
- Recorded: Capitol Studios, Los Angeles, CA, Evergreen Studios and MRC Studios, New York City, Powerhouse Studios, Johannesburg
- Genre: Folk, African music
- Label: EMI
- Producer: Hilton Rosenthal, David Belafonte

Harry Belafonte chronology
Loving You is Where I Belong (1981)	Paradise in Gazankulu (1988)	Belafonte '89 (1989)

Professional ratings
Review scores
Source	Rating
AllMusic	4/5 stars
Christgau's Record Guide	C+

Paradise in Gazankulu is the 27th and final studio album by Harry Belafonte, released by EMI Records in 1988. The album deals with the plight of black South Africans under the Apartheid system at the time of its release. The album was re-released as an official MP3 download in the U.K in 2010. The title is in reference to the former South African Bantustan of Gazankulu that was intended by the apartheid-era government to be a semi-independent homeland for the Tsonga people.

== Track listing ==
1. "We Are the Wave" (Jake Holmes, Richard Cummings, The Soul Brothers) – 3:32
2. "Paradise in Gazankulu" (Holmes, Oben Ngobeni) – 4:27
3. "Skin to Skin" (Holmes, Godfrey Nelson) – 4:25
4. "Amandla" (Holmes, Dominic M. Zuma) – 4:05
5. "Kwela (Listen To The Man)" (Holmes, S. M. Nkabinde) – 4:00
6. "Monday to Monday" (Holmes, Dominic M. Zuma, R. Klaas) – 4:14
7. "Global Carnival" (Holmes, Alistair Coakley) – 3:43
8. "Capetown" (Holmes, M. Xaba, R. Bopape) – 3:58
9. "Sisiwami (Sweet Sister)" (Holmes, The Soul Brothers) – 4:49
10. "Move It" (Holmes, Van Van, Vusi Khumalo) – 4:57

== Personnel ==
- Harry Belafonte – vocals
- Alistair Coakely – guitar
- Jose Alves – guitar
- Themba “Stompie” Dlamini – guitar
- Laurence Matshiza – guitar, background vocals
- V. Mkhize – guitar
- Maxwell "China" Mngadi – guitar
- José Neto – guitar
- Oben Ngobeni – guitar
- Marks Makwane – guitar
- Alex Acuña – percussion
- Neil Clarke – percussion
- Youssou N'Dour – percussion
- Chi Sharpe – percussion
- Assane Thiam – percussion
- Babakar Meaye – percussion
- Richard Cummings – keyboards
- Christopher Dlathu – bass
- Bakithi Kumalo – bass
- Denny Laloutte – bass
- Thembile Michael Masoka – bass
- Joseph Mokwela – bass
- Sicelo Ndlela – bass
- Vusi Khumalo – drums, background vocals
- Lucky Monoma – drums
- Bongani Nxele – drums
- Richie Marrero – keyboards, background vocals
- Mduduzi Mlangeni – keyboards
- Dumisane Ngubeni – keyboards
- Moses "Crocodile" Ngwenya – keyboards
- Hilton Rosenthal – keyboards, guitar
- West Nkosi – pennywhistles
- Victor Paz – trumpet
- Francis Bonny – trumpet
- Wilmer Wise – trumpet
- Lemmy "Special" Mabaso – saxophone
- Ricky Ford – saxophone
- Morris Goldberg – saxophone
- Dick Griffin – trombone
- Carlos Ward – saxophone
- Jennifer Warnes – vocals on "Skin to Skin"
- Bobby Allende – background vocals
- Jake Holmes – background vocals
- Ralph Irizarry – background vocals
- Selina Khoza – background vocals
- Brenda Fassie – background vocals and co-lead vocals on “Monday to Monday”
- Sharon Brooks – background vocals
- John Cartwright – background vocals
- Jean Madubane – background vocals
- Debbie Malone – background vocals
- Ronnie Martin – background vocals
- David Masondo – background vocals
- Grace Ngobeni – background vocals
- Jane Ngobeni – background vocals
- Marilyn Nokwe – background vocals
- Tu Nokwe – background vocals
- Deborah Sharpe – background vocals
- Ty Stevens – background vocals

Production notes:

- Hilton Rosenthal – producer, drum programming
- Harry Belafonte – executive producer
- Richard Cummings – arranger, conductor
- Peter Thwaites – engineer
- Charlie Paakkari – engineer
- David Belafonte – engineer
- Larry Walsh – engineer
- Chris Rudy – engineer
- Tom Lewis – engineer
- Fernando Perdigao – assistant engineer
- Bobby Summerfield – mixer, engineer, drum programming, sampling, synthesizer programming
- Scott Ansell – assistant engineer
- Ellen Fitton – assistant engineer
- Billy Straus – assistant engineer
- Ben-Ben, Hahn – assistant engineer
- Peter Doell – assistant engineer
- Bernie Grundman – mastering
- David Nadien – concert master
- Chris Callis – photography
- Suzette Abbot – photography
- Carol Chen – design
- Henry Marquez – art direction
