= And So To Bed =

And so to bed is an expression often used by Samuel Pepys at the end of his day's diary entry.

It may also refer to:

- And So To Bed (play) (1926), by J. B. Fagan
- "And So To Bed" (1958), a song on the Jack Pleis and His Orchestra album, Music for Two Sleepy People
- "And So To Bed" (1970), a song on the Atomic Rooster album, Atomic Roooster
- "And So To Bed" (1986), a song on the Phish album, Phish
