= List of 1966–67 NBA season transactions =

These are the list of personnel changes in the NBA from the 1966–67 NBA season.

== Events ==
=== August 3, 1966 ===
- The Boston Celtics signed Art Heyman as a free agent.

=== September 1, 1966 ===
- The Boston Celtics traded Mel Counts to the Baltimore Bullets for Bailey Howell.
- The Detroit Pistons sold Bob Warlick to the San Francisco Warriors.

=== September 7, 1966 ===
- The Chicago Bulls traded Jim King, Jeff Mullins and cash to the San Francisco Warriors for Guy Rodgers.

=== September 14, 1966 ===
- The Cincinnati Royals sold Tom Hawkins to the Los Angeles Lakers.

=== September 15, 1966 ===
- The Cincinnati Royals traded Wayne Embry to the Boston Celtics for a 1967 3rd round draft pick (Sam Smith was later selected).

=== September 22, 1966 ===
- The Los Angeles Lakers traded Leroy Ellis to the Baltimore Bullets for Jim Barnes.

=== September 23, 1966 ===
- The Cincinnati Royals signed Bill Dinwiddie as a free agent.

=== October 11, 1966 ===
- The Boston Celtics sold Johnny Austin to the Baltimore Bullets.

=== October 14, 1966 ===
- The Chicago Bulls sold John Barnhill to the Baltimore Bullets.
- The Chicago Bulls sold Nate Bowman to the Philadelphia 76ers.

=== October 20, 1966 ===
- The Baltimore Bullets waived Johnny Austin.

=== October 31, 1966 ===
- The Baltimore Bullets sold Neil Johnson to the New York Knicks.

=== November 3, 1966 ===
- The Baltimore Bullets fired Mike Farmer as head coach.
- The Baltimore Bullets appointed Buddy Jeannette as interim head coach.

=== November 10, 1966 ===
- The St. Louis Hawks signed Tom Hoover as a free agent.

=== November 11, 1966 ===
- The Philadelphia 76ers waived Ken Wilburn.

=== November 25, 1966 ===
- The Chicago Bulls traded Len Chappell to the Cincinnati Royals for George Wilson.

=== December 5, 1966 ===
- The Baltimore Bullets hired Gene Shue as head coach.

=== January 16, 1967 ===
In a 3-team trade, the Baltimore Bullets traded Mel Counts to the Los Angeles Lakers; the Detroit Pistons traded Ray Scott to the Baltimore Bullets; and the Los Angeles Lakers traded Rudy LaRusso and a 1967 1st round draft pick (Sonny Dove was later selected) to the Detroit Pistons. Detroit got a 1st round draft pick in 1967 when LaRusso refused to report; LaRusso was later sold to San Francisco.

=== January 29, 1967 ===
- The Baltimore Bullets sold Wayne Hightower to the Detroit Pistons.

=== February 17, 1967 ===
- The Detroit Pistons signed Bob Hogsett as a free agent.

=== March 7, 1967 ===
- Dave DeBusschere resigns as head coach for Detroit Pistons.
- The Detroit Pistons hired Donnie Butcher as head coach.

=== March 29, 1967 ===
- The San Diego Rockets hired Jack McMahon as head coach.
- Jack McMahon resigns as head coach for Cincinnati Royals.

=== April 26, 1967 ===
- The Los Angeles Lakers reassigned Head Coach Fred Schaus.
- The Los Angeles Lakers hired Butch Van Breda Kolff as head coach.

=== May 1, 1967 ===
- The Seattle SuperSonics drafted Walt Hazzard from the Los Angeles Lakers in the NBA expansion draft.
- The Seattle SuperSonics drafted Henry Akin from the New York Knicks in the NBA expansion draft.
- The San Diego Rockets drafted Jim Barnett from the Boston Celtics in the NBA expansion draft.
- The San Diego Rockets drafted John Barnhill from the Baltimore Bullets in the NBA expansion draft.
- The San Diego Rockets drafted John Block from the Los Angeles Lakers in the NBA expansion draft.
- The Seattle SuperSonics drafted Nate Bowman from the Philadelphia 76ers in the NBA expansion draft.
- The Seattle SuperSonics drafted Dave Deutsch from the New York Knicks in the NBA expansion draft.
- The San Diego Rockets drafted Hank Finkel from the Los Angeles Lakers in the NBA expansion draft.
- The San Diego Rockets drafted Dave Gambee from the Philadelphia 76ers in the NBA expansion draft.
- The San Diego Rockets drafted Johnny Green from the Baltimore Bullets in the NBA expansion draft.
- The Seattle SuperSonics drafted Richie Guerin from the St. Louis Hawks in the NBA expansion draft.
- The San Diego Rockets drafted Toby Kimball from the Boston Celtics in the NBA expansion draft.
- The San Diego Rockets drafted Don Kojis from the Chicago Bulls in the NBA expansion draft.
- The Seattle SuperSonics drafted Tommy Kron from the St. Louis Hawks in the NBA expansion draft.
- The San Diego Rockets drafted Freddie Lewis from the Cincinnati Royals in the NBA expansion draft.
- The San Diego Rockets drafted Jon McGlocklin from the Cincinnati Royals in the NBA expansion draft.
- The Seattle SuperSonics drafted Tom Meschery from the San Francisco Warriors in the NBA expansion draft.
- The Seattle SuperSonics drafted Dorie Murrey from the Detroit Pistons in the NBA expansion draft.
- The Seattle SuperSonics drafted Bud Olsen from the San Francisco Warriors in the NBA expansion draft.
- The Seattle SuperSonics drafted Ron Reed from the Detroit Pistons in the NBA expansion draft.
- The Seattle SuperSonics drafted Rod Thorn from the St. Louis Hawks in the NBA expansion draft.
- The San Diego Rockets drafted Gerry Ward from the Cincinnati Royals in the NBA expansion draft.
- The San Diego Rockets drafted Jim Ware from the Cincinnati Royals in the NBA expansion draft.
- The Seattle SuperSonics drafted Ben Warley from the Baltimore Bullets in the NBA expansion draft.
- The Seattle SuperSonics drafted Ron Watts from the Boston Celtics in the NBA expansion draft.
- The Seattle SuperSonics drafted Bob Weiss from the Philadelphia 76ers in the NBA expansion draft.
- The Seattle SuperSonics drafted George Wilson from the Chicago Bulls in the NBA expansion draft.

=== May 2, 1967 ===
- The Cincinnati Royals hired Ed Jucker as head coach.

=== June 19, 1967 ===
- The Oakland Oaks signed Rick Barry as a free agent. Barry jumped to the ABA.

=== June 22, 1967 ===
- The St. Louis Hawks signed Jay Miller as a free agent.
