= Music for Two Sleepy People =

Studio album by Jack Pleis and His Orchestra
- Released: 1958
- Genre: Jazz
- Label: Decca

Jack Pleis and His Orchestra chronology
50 Memorable Melodies In Hi-Fi	Music for Two Sleepy People	Medley from The Musical "Through The Years"

Music for Two Sleepy People is a 1958 album by Jack Pleis (credited as Jack Pleis and His Orchestra).

== Background ==
Jack Pleis (1917–1990) was an American jazz pianist, arranger, conductor, composer and producer. Prior to World War II, he had been one of Jan Savitt's "Top Hatters". After serving in the war, he worked several years at London Records, moving to Decca in 1953, where he and his orchestra initially backed other artists including his wife Karen Chandler, The Four Aces, Eileen Barton, Teresa Brewer, and the Dinning Sisters. He went on to release a number of records, releasing seven albums of his own between 1955 and 1976, of which this is the sixth. He also arranged and produced many songs and albums for other artists.

== Critical reception ==
Music for Two Sleepy People was reviewed in Billboard, which called it "relaxed, pleasant mood music". High Fidelity wrote that the "easy-flowing, pleasantly relaxed performances ... could easily propel any two (or more) sleepy people right into the arms of Morpheus." The album was also reviewed in HiFi Review and The School Musician.

== Track listing ==
Jack Pleis and His Orchestra (1958). Music for Two Sleepy People (LP). Decca. DL 8763.

No.	Title	Writer(s)	Length
1.	"Two Sleepy People"	Hoagy Carmichael/Frank Loesser
2.	"Close Your Eyes"	Bernice Petkere
3.	"Hit the Road to Dreamland"	Harold Arlen/Johnny Mercer
4.	"Land Of Dreams"
5.	"Out Of My Dreams"
6.	"Lullaby In Rhythm"
7.	"I'd Love To Fall Asleep (And Wake Up In Your Arms)"
8.	"I'll Close My Eyes"	Billy Reid
9.	"Let's Put Out the Lights (and Go to Sleep)"	Herman Hupfeld
10.	"Lights Out"
11.	"And So To Bed"
12.	"Goodnight, Sweet Dreams"
