= George Tunnell =

American singer

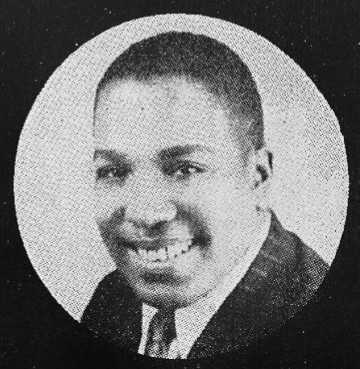
George Tunnell, c. 1945

George "Bon Bon" Tunnell (June 29, 1912 – May 20, 1975) was an American jazz vocalist.

== Biography ==
Born in Reading, Pennsylvania, United States, Tunnell was one of the first African American vocalists to perform with a white band, that of Jan Savitt and his band, The Top Hatters.

Tunnell's nickname originated when he and singer Mervyn Schaeffer performed on a program sponsored by a confectionary company on radio station WCAU. The two were called "The Candy Kids", with Tunnell nicknamed "Bon Bon" and Schaeffer nicknamed "Lollipop".

In the early 1930s, he fronted a vocal quartet, the Three Keys, which had a hit with "Fit as a Fiddle".

Tunnell then joined Jan Savitt's Band and recorded a number of tracks with them including "Moonlight Masquerade", "The Gypsy in My Soul", "A Kiss for Consolation", plus two best-selling numbers, "Hi-Yo Silver" and "Make Believe Island".

In 1941, Tunnell left Savitt and began recording solo tracks including "I Don't Want to Set the World on Fire", "Blow, Gabriel Blow" and "Most Emphatically, Yes!"

He then joined Spirits of Rhythm jazz ensemble briefly before spending time fronting the Tommy Reynolds Band during the 1950s.

When Tunnell's career slowed, he returned to live in Pennsylvania.

He died in May 1975, in Lower Merion Township, Pennsylvania, at the age of 62.

== Bibliography ==
- Jazz Records 1897-1942 4th Revised and Enlarged Edition, by Brian Rust, Arlington House Publishers, New Rochelle, New York, 1978, ISBN 9780902391048
