= Jake Holmes =

American singer-songwriter (b. 1939)

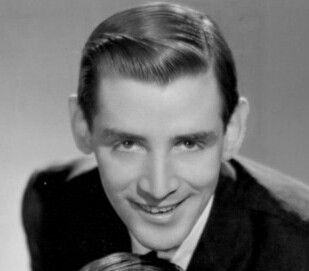

Background information
- Born: December 28, 1939 (age 86); San Francisco, California, United States
- Genres: Pop, folk
- Occupation: Singer-songwriter
- Instrument: Guitar
- Years active: 1963–present
- Labels: Tower, Polydor, Columbia

Jake Holmes (born December 28, 1939) is an American singer-songwriter and jingle writer who began a recording career in the 1960s.

Holmes is the author of the song "Dazed and Confused", later reworked by Led Zeppelin. Holmes also composed the music to the US Army recruitment jingle "Be All That You Can Be" in the 1980s. The jingle and subsequent advertising campaign was used extensively by the US government throughout the 1980s. Holmes also wrote the "I'm A Pepper" jingle, and with Randy Newman co-wrote the "Most Original Soft Drink Ever" jingle for the Dr Pepper soft drink.

== Career ==
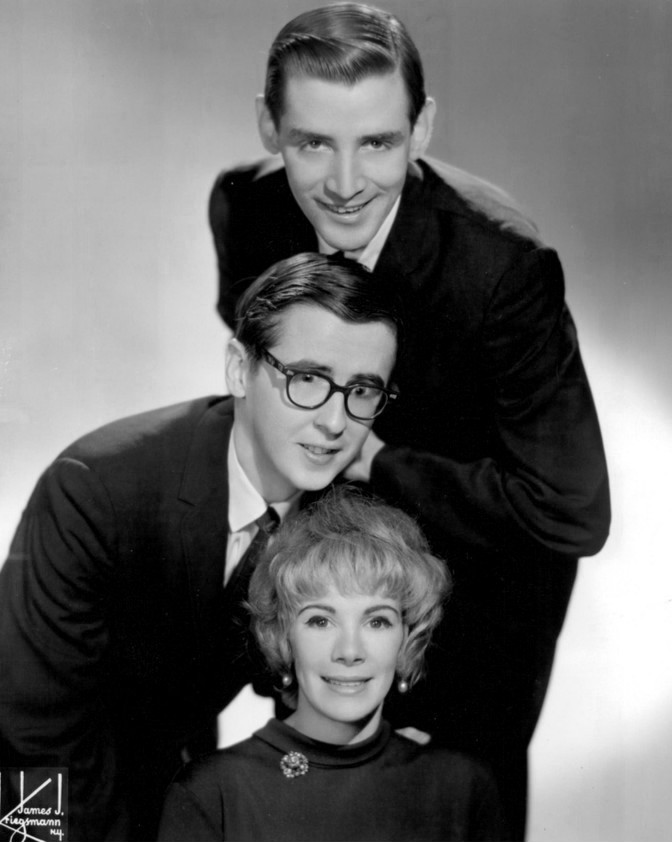
From top to bottom: Jake Holmes, Jim Connell, and Joan Rivers when they worked as the team "Jim, Jake & Joan"

Holmes' first musical foray was with his wife Katherine in the folk pop parody duo, Allen & Grier. Following military service, he resumed his music career. Among the highlights: Holmes put lyrics to Bob Gaudio's music on The Four Seasons' 1969 Genuine Imitation Life Gazette album, after which the pair went on to compose Frank Sinatra's 1970 Watertown album. Coming during a relative low point in Sinatra's career, Watertown was his least successful album, but the song "I Would Be in Love (Anyway)" reached No. 4 on the Billboard Adult Contemporary chart. The song "What's Now is Now" reached No. 31 on that chart and was later included in Frank Sinatra's Greatest Hits Volume 2. Sinatra's recording of the Gaudio-Holmes composition "Lady Day" was left off the Watertown album, but was released as a single, and Don Costa later rearranged "Lady Day" for inclusion in Sinatra's Sinatra & Company album (1971). In 1985, Nina Simone recorded a cover version of "For a While", from the Watertown album, for her Nina's Back album. That same year, she recorded a live version of "For a While" for her Live And Kickin' album.

On his own, Holmes recorded during the 1960s two well-regarded albums for EMI's Tower Records label: A Letter to Katherine December, and "The Above Ground Sound" of Jake Holmes, which contained the aforementioned "Dazed and Confused" and "Genuine Imitation Life". The Four Seasons' Bob Gaudio heard Holmes sing "Genuine Imitation Life" at The Bitter End in New York's City's Greenwich Village, which led to their collaborations on The Four Seasons and Sinatra albums.

Between those projects, Holmes, who had landed a recording contract with Polydor, went to Nashville to record an album called Jake Holmes. That was followed by the most successful solo album of his career, So Close, So Very Far to Go. Released by Polydor in 1970, it reached No. 135 on the Billboard album chart, and the single "So Close" rose to No. 49 on Billboard's Hot 100. In 1970, Lena Horne sang Holmes' "It's Always Somewhere Else" on a TV special made with Harry Belafonte and released on the album Harry & Lena. Belafonte commenced recording Holmes' songs on The Warm Touch (1971), followed by Play Me (the song "So Close", 1973), and Loving You Is Where I Belong (1981), culminating in a whole album, 1988's Paradise in Gazankulu. These were followed by the live recordings Belafonte '89 and An Evening with Harry Belafonte and Friends (1997). In 1977, "So Close" became the title song of an album by Helen Schneider, a popular New York nightclub singer.

Holmes' modest success with Polydor led to a contract with Columbia Records and the album How Much Time. It was as accomplished as all his work but yielded no hits in a pop era that was about to be swamped by disco music.

Later in the 1970s, with his music career stalling, Holmes moved into writing advertising jingles for HEA Productions, which provided music for advertising agencies. His first jingle for HEA was for an anti-drug campaign, "What Do You Do When the Music Stops". Besides the US Army slogan and Dr Pepper jingle, he is also the composer of the "Aren't You Hungry for Burger King Now?" campaign (1981), "Come see the softer side of Sears", and many other commercials – most famously in the UK, "We'll Take More Care Of You" for British Airways – earning him the nickname "Jingle Jake". His voice can also be heard on commercials for Philip Morris, General Motors, Union Carbide, Gillette, DeBeers, Winn-Dixie and BP. In the 1990s, Holmes set up a production company for jingles and music, called Three Tree Productions.

Even as his jingle career flourished, Holmes never gave up songwriting. He co-wrote every song on Harry Belafonte's 1988 album Paradise in Gazankulu, including the song Kwela (Listen to the Man), after which Belafonte's subsequent concert video was named. As the new century dawned, Holmes released a new solo album called Dangerous Times, and jumped into the political fray with anti-George W. Bush songs such as "Mission Accomplished" and "I Hear Texas".

== Discography ==
- "The Above Ground Sound" of Jake Holmes (Tower, 1967)
- A Letter to Katherine December (Tower, 1968)
- Jake Holmes (Polydor, 1969)
- So Close, So Very Far to Go (Polydor, 1970)
- How Much Time (Columbia, 1971)
- Mission Accomplished – The Return of the Protest Song (three song ep; about George W. Bush)
- Dangerous Times (2000)

== Jingles composed ==
External videos
- IBM PS/2 commercial (1988) (Courtesy Centre for Computing History. For copyright reasons: See PD-US-1989. No records found.)

- "Building a better way .... to see the U.S.A." for Chevrolet (General Motors) (1972)
- "Most Original Soft Drink Ever" for Dr Pepper (with Randy Newman)
- "We'll Take More Care of You" for British Airways (1975)
- "I'm a Pepper" for Dr Pepper (1977)
- "You Can Have Half and Still Have a Whole" for Hershey's Almond Joy" (197X)
- "Be all that you can be" for the U.S. Army (1979)
- "We fly the world" for Pan American World Airways (1977)
- "Raise your hand if you're Sure" for Sure deodorant (197X)
- "Aren't You Hungry for Burger King Now?" for Burger King (1981)
- "America's Getting Into Training" for Amtrak corporation (1981)
- "Come to Metropolitan and simplify your life" for Metropolitan Life Insurance Company (1981)
- "Great Moments for You on CBS" for CBS (1982)
- "Help Yourself to Stouffer's Pizza" for Stouffer's (1984)
- "Ah ha, we're sitting pretty, altogether in Schaeffer City" for Schaeffer Beer (198X)
- "NBC, Let's All Be There!" for NBC (1985)
- "PS/2 it!" for IBM (1987)
- "Best a Man Can Get" for The Gillette Company (1988)
- "Come see the softer side of Sears" for Sears (1993)
- "Gordon Elliott Show" (1995)
- "With Charmin Ultra, Less Is More" (Cha-cha-cha!!!) for Charmin (Early 2000s)

== Dazed and Confused ==
Holmes is known for writing "Dazed and Confused," which appeared on his debut album "The Above Ground Sound" of Jake Holmes. It was later adapted without attribution and popularized by Jimmy Page of the Yardbirds and Led Zeppelin. A Yardbirds live recording from French TV series Bouton Rouge (recorded on March 9, 1968) was released on Cumular Limit in 2000, credited as "Dazed and Confused" by Jake Holmes arr. Yardbirds. Another live performance (recorded March 30, 1968, New York City) is included on the album Live Yardbirds: Featuring Jimmy Page under the alternate title "I'm Confused". It is the only track that has no songwriter credits on the release.

As of 2016 it is now widely recognized that Holmes is the author of the song. Page, while on tour with the Yardbirds in 1967, saw Holmes perform the song in Greenwich Village. Within months, he had adapted the song for that group, and later, for Led Zeppelin. Page claimed sole songwriting credit for the song when it appeared on Led Zeppelin's debut album. Holmes later sent Page a letter about the songwriting credits but received no reply.

In June 2010, Holmes filed a lawsuit against Jimmy Page for copyright infringement in US federal court, claiming Page knowingly copied his work.

November 2012's release of Celebration Day (The Led Zeppelin Reunion Show at the O2) credits "Dazed and Confused" as written by Jimmy Page (inspired by Jake Holmes).

On the CD and vinyl re-releases of the debut album in June 2014, the songwriting credits on the CD or vinyl state "Dazed and Confused"; Page – inspired by Jake Holmes. There are no songwriting credits on the vinyl sleeve or CD jewel case.
