= Loving You Is Where I Belong =

Loving You is Where I Belong

Studio album by Harry Belafonte
- Released: 1981
- Recorded: Soundworks and Powerstation, New York City 1977
- Genre: Pop
- Label: Columbia
- Producer: John Cartwright, Bob Freedman

Harry Belafonte chronology
Turn the World Around (1977)	Loving You is Where I Belong (1981)	Paradise in Gazankulu (1988)

Professional ratings
Review scores
Source	Rating
Allmusic	2/5 stars

Loving You is Where I Belong is an album by Harry Belafonte, released in 1981.

== Track listing ==
1. "Something to Hold Onto" (Gene Pistilli, Walter Murphy) – 3:55
2. "Mary Makes Magic" (Hoyt Axton) – 5:58
3. "The Rose" (Amanda McBroom) – 4:20
4. "I Told You" (Jake Holmes) – 4:05
5. "Streets of London" (Ralph McTell) – 5:03
6. "Loving You is Where I Belong" (Steven Marc Cristol) – 4:25
7. "Forever Young / Jabulani" (Bob Dylan / Caiphus Semenya, Harry Belafonte) – 4:16
8. "I Don't Need Her" (Holmes) – 5:03
9. "Did You Know" (Holmes) – 3:44
10. "Genuine Imitation Life" (Holmes) – 4:35
  1989 cd reissue bonus tracks:
11. "Marching To The Fair" (Morris Goldberg, Shunmugan Pillay) – 5:44
12. "Sunbird" (Pat Rosalia, Robert McKinnon) – 4:05

== Personnel ==
- Harry Belafonte – vocals
- Jay Berliner – guitar
- Gene Bertoncini – guitar
- Don Brooks – harmonica
- Hiram Bullock – guitar
- Dan Carillo – guitar
- Jay McGeehan – guitar
- José Neto – cavaquinho, guitar
- John Cartwright – bass
- John Beal – bass
- Francisco Centano – bass
- Sal Cuevas – bass
- Bob Freedman – strings
- Morris Goldberg – saxophone
- Ross Levinson – violin
- Chris Parker – drums
- Brian Brake – drums
- Steve Thornton – percussion
- Arthur Williams – background vocals

Production notes:

- John Cartwright – producer
- Bob Freedman – producer, orchestration
- Harry Belafonte – executive producer
- Richard Cummings – musical director, orchestration
- David Belafonte – engineer, mixing
- Edmund Orsorio – engineer
- Wayne Yurhelum – engineer
- Gene Orloff – concert master
- David Nadien – concert master
- Eric Meola – Les Underhill
- Phyllis H. B. – design
