= Jack Pleis =

American jazz pianist and composer (1917–1990)

- Pleis, on the back cover of Strings and Things (1957)

Background information
- Born: May 11, 1917; Philadelphia, Pennsylvania, U.S.
- Died: December 5, 1990 (aged 73) Palm Springs, California, U.S.
- Genres: Jazz, easy listening
- Occupations: Pianist, arranger, conductor, composer, producer
- Instrument: Piano
- Years active: 1939–1976
- Labels: London Records; Decca Records; Columbia Records

Jack K. Pleis (May 11, 1917 – December 5, 1990) was an American jazz pianist, arranger, conductor, composer and producer. He recorded on London and Decca Records in the 1950s, and Columbia Records in the 1960s. During the course of his career, Pleis worked with many artists, including Louis Armstrong, Harry Belafonte, Bing Crosby, Sammy Davis Jr., Benny Goodman, Earl Grant, Brenda Lee, and Joe Williams. Between 1950 and 1976, more than 150 songs were arranged by Pleis. His surname is pronounced "Pleece" (to rhyme with "fleece").

== Early life and education ==
Jack Pleis was born in Philadelphia on May 11, 1917. Starting at the age of four, he began his training in classical piano. He first performed in concert when he was seven. By the time he was eleven, he appeared on radio programs for children.

Pleis enrolled in college intending to study medicine. To support his studies, he played piano in jazz and popular music bands. Eventually he left school and moved to New York City, where he began his musical career.

== Career ==
=== Early days ===
In New York, Pleis became successful as a pianist, arranger, conductor, and composer. He was one of Jan Savitt's Top Hatters, playing piano and doing arrangements, a position he left in 1942 to enlist in the Army during World War II. In 1947, the Jack Pleis Trio provided instrumental support for Larry Laurence (with The Quintones providing vocal harmonies). By 1948, Pleis was working at the RCA Victor studios on 24th Street, appearing on the cover of the January 1, 1949, issue of Billboard playing piano at the studio's holiday party. His orchestra backed Teresa Brewer and Bobby Wayne on their 1949 single "Copper Canyon"/"'Way Back Home". Pleis was also part of the Dixieland All-Stars group which backed Brewer's breakout hit (and signature song) "Music! Music! Music!" in late 1949.

=== London Records ===
Pleis joined the American Society of Composers, Authors and Publishers (ASCAP) in 1950. He began work as arranger and composer at London Records under Tutti Camarata. The orchestra backed Ralph Young on his 1950 London single "Please Treat Her Nicer"/"I've Got the World on a String", and Pleis released his own single "Ragging the Scale"/"Story of the Stars", the B-side of which ranked at number 10 on "The Disk Jockeys Pick" in Billboard. In early May 1950, he accompanied his future wife, London recording artist Eve Young, on a promotional tour prior to her opening show. Pleis released several more singles, "Time Alone (Can Heal a Broken Heart)"/"What is There to Say", "I'll Always Be in Love with You"/"Caravan", and "Le Petite Valse"/"Ragamuffin", and the orchestra backed Snooky Lanson on his 1950 London single "You Wonderful You"/"Honestly I Love You".

In June 1950, Pleis married Eve Young, and the March birth of their daughter Michelle was noted in an April 1951 Billboard. The Orchestra backed Eve on her single "Just for Tonight"/"Would I Love You?" In 1952, Pleis and orchestra worked with The Bell Sisters and continued working with Teresa Brewer. Pleis left London Records, and Eve signed a new contract with Coral Records, recording under her new name, Karen Chandler. Her debut for Coral, backed by Pleis' orchestra, was the song "Hold Me, Thrill Me, Kiss Me," and it became an enormous hit. Selling over a million copies, it peaked at No. 5 on the Billboard charts. In 1953, Pleis and orchestra backed her on her third Coral release, "I'd Love to Fall Asleep (And Wake Up in Your Arms)"/"Goodbye, Charlie, Goodbye".

=== Decca Records ===
In mid-1953 Pleis joined Decca Records under Milt Gabler. Pleis and Orchestra released "The Eighteenth Variation"/"Mr. Peepers" under the Decca label. The orchestra backed Karen Chandler again on "Why?"/"Flash From the Blue". 1954 saw the release of the orchestra's Decca singles, "Frenchman in St. Louis"/"Pagan in Paris", "Ah Ri Rung", and "For Always"/"Beyond the Blue Horizon", and the orchestra backed the Dinning Sisters on "Steel Guitar Rag", Eileen Barton on "And Then", and Teresa Brewer on her album A Bouquet of Hits.

1955 saw Pleis scheduled to be profiled in the April issue of The American Magazine. Pleis and His Orchestra began releasing singles of Disney film songs (also collected and released on the album Music from Disneyland), and also released "Lies"/"Hey There" and "Pauline"/"The Trouble With Harry", the title tune for Alfred Hitchcock's film, The Trouble with Harry.

In 1956, Pleis and His Orchestra again backed Karen Chandler, this time on her first Decca release, and Pleis released another album, Strings and Things. The orchestra backed Bobby Darrin on his single "Rock Island Line"/"Timber". In October, Pleiss' song "Giant", theme of the film Giant, debuted on the Billboard Hot 100 at #93, peaking at #91 in December, and the song "I'll Always Be In Love With You" charted at #65, also in December. Pleis also produced Bing Crosby's album, Songs I Wish I Had Sung the First Time Around.

1957 saw the release of singles "(But As They Say) That's Life"/"Goodnight Waltz", "Search for Paradise"/"Serenade to Michelle", and "The Carefree Heart"/"Serenade in Soft Shoe", and the Orchestra backed Georgie Shaw on "One More Sunrise", Sammy Davis Jr. on "The Golden Key", and Merv Griffin on "I'll Be Thinking of You". "(But As They Say) That's Life" charted at #69 in June 1957.

In 1958, the Orchestra backed Carmen McRae on her album Mad About the Man, as well as Toni Arden and also backed The Four Aces on their album Swingin' Aces. He produced the Kalin Twins' song "When", which spent five weeks at No. 1 on the UK charts.

In 1960, Pleis conducted for The Castilians' album, Valentino Tangos. Pleis and Orchestra backed Sammy Davis Jr. on a dozen tracks for Decca, including "What Kind of Fool Am I?" (which won the Grammy Award for Song of the Year in 1963), "The Lady Is a Tramp", "I Gotta Right to Sing the Blues", "Do Nothin' Till You Hear From Me", "I Got a Woman", "There Is No Greater Love", "Gee, Baby, Ain't I Good to You", "This Little Girl of Mine", "Till Then", and "Mess Around".

=== Columbia Records ===
The 1960s brought a move to Columbia Records. In 1961, Pleis and Orchestra backed Brazilian singer Maysa Matarazzo on her album Maysa Sings Songs Before Dawn, he conducted for Billy Butterfield's album, The Golden Horn, and arranged several of the tracks on Lionel Hampton's album, Soft Vibes Soaring Strings. Pleis also produced Les Elgart's album, "It's De-Lovely" For Dancing and Listening, and released an EP, Medley from The Musical "Through The Years", and an LP, Stage Left, Stage Right. In 1963, he conducted for Peter Nero's album, Born Free, and Pleis and Orchestra backed Liza Minnelli on her single, "One Summer Love"/"How Much Do I Love You?".

=== Film and television scores ===
Pleis and His Orchestra performed the songs "Strange Feelings" and "The Blues I Got Comin' Tomorrow" for the soundtrack of the 1961 film, Force of Impulse. Pleis composed and conducted the music for the 1964 film, Diary of a Bachelor. He also composed music for the television shows Family Affair (1966), Gunsmoke (1967), The Wild Wild West (1967–1969), and Dusty's Trail (1973–1974).

=== Later career ===
Pleis arranged the songs on side one of Johnny Hartman's 1967 album, I Love Everybody, including "If I Had You", "I Cover the Waterfront", and "For Once in My Life".

Under the moniker The Sounds of Our Times, Pleis co-produced and penned two songs for the 1967 easy listening, psychedelic instrumental LP Music of the Flower Children.

Pleis produced several of Harry Belafonte's albums, Belafonte by Request (1970), The Warm Touch (1971), and Calypso Carnival (1971). Pleis also produced several of Jack Jones' albums, A Jack Jones Christmas (1969), A Time for Us (1970), and Christmas With Jack Jones (1973). He produced Hugo Montenegro's album, Colours Of Love (1970).

In 1976, Pleis put out what would be the last album released under his own name, I Play the Songs the Whole World Sings, on Ranwood Records.

== Private life and death ==
Pleis was married to singer Karen Chandler. He died on December 5, 1990, in Palm Springs, California, at the age of 73.

== Charted hits ==
- "Giant", Billboard Hot 100, #93 (10/20/1956), #91 (12/29/1956)
- "I'll Always Be In Love With You", Billboard Hot 100, #65 (12/08/1956)
- "(But As They Say) That's Life", Billboard Hot 100, #69 (6/17/1957)

== Selected discography ==
=== Albums ===
==== Music from Disneyland ====
Jack Pleis and His Orchestra and Chorus (1955). Music from Disneyland (LP). Decca. DL 8105.

No.	Title	Writer(s)	Length
1.	"When You Wish upon a Star"	Leigh Harline/Ned Washington	2:56
2.	"Heigh-Ho - Whistle While You Work"	Frank Churchill/Larry Morey	2:47
3.	"Someday My Prince Will Come" ("Some Day I'll Find My Love")	Frank Churchill/Larry Morey	2:45
4.	"Baía"	Ary Barroso/Ray Gilbert	3:27
5.	"Who's Afraid of the Big Bad Wolf?"	Frank Churchill/Ann Ronell	3:00
6.	"Bibbidi-Bobbidi-Boo" ("The Magic Song")	Al Hoffman/Jerry Livingston/Mack David	2:34
7.	"A Dream Is a Wish Your Heart Makes"	Al Hoffman/Jerry Livingston/Mack David	2:44
8.	"Lavender Blue" ("Dilly, Dilly")	Traditional	2:44
9.	"Melody Time"	George David Weiss/Bennie Benjamin	2:59
10.	"You Belong to My Heart"	Agustín Lara/Ray Gilbert	3:00
11.	"Love Is a Song"	Frank Churchill/Larry Morey	3:18
12.	"Zip-a-Dee-Doo-Dah"	Allie Wrubel/Ray Gilbert	2:21

==== Broadway Goes Hollywood ====
Jack Pleis, His Piano, Orchestra and Chorus (1955). Broadway Goes Hollywood (LP). Decca. DL 8167.

No.	Title	Writer(s)	Length
1.	"Oh, What a Beautiful Mornin'"	Rodgers & Hammerstein
2.	"People Will Say We're in Love"	Rodgers & Hammerstein
3.	"I Love Paris"	Cole Porter
4.	"Stranger in Paradise"	Robert Wright/George Forrest
5.	"Hey There"	Jerry Ross/Richard Adler	2:43
6.	"I'll Know"	Frank Loesser
7.	"Hello, Young Lovers"	Rodgers & Hammerstein
8.	"We Kiss in a Shadow"	Rodgers & Hammerstein
9.	"A Wonderful Guy"	Rodgers & Hammerstein
10.	"Younger Than Springtime"	Rodgers & Hammerstein
11.	"Old Devil Moon"	Burton Lane/Yip Harburg
12.	"I Get a Kick Out of You"	Cole Porter

==== Strings and Things ====
Jack Pleis, His Piano, Chorus and Orchestra (1957). Strings and Things (LP). Decca. DL 8422.

No.	Title	Writer(s)	Length
1.	"Frenchman In St. Louis"		3:01
2.	"The Waltz Of Tears"
3.	"For Always"
4.	"Mr. Peepers"
5.	"A Catchy Tune"
6.	"Beyond The Blue Horizon"	Robin/Whiting/Harling
7.	"I'll Always Be In Love With You"
8.	"Paris Loves Lovers"
9.	"Theme from The Story of Three Loves, The Eighteenth Variation"	Miklós Rózsa
10.	"Todd"
11.	"Strings And Things"	Jack Pleis
12.	"Pagan In Paris"		2:51

==== Serenades to Remember ====
Jack Pleis, His Piano and Orchestra (1957). Serenades to Remember (LP). Decca. DL 8586.

No.	Title	Writer(s)	Length
1.	"Moonlight Serenade"	Glenn Miller/Mitchell Parish
2.	"Serenade To Michelle"	Jack Pleis
3.	"Sunrise Serenade"	Frankie Carle/Jack Lawrence
4.	"Serenade In Soft Shoe"	Jack Pleis
5.	"Autumn Serenade"	Peter DeRose/Sammy Gallop
6.	"A Blues Serenade"	Frank Signorelli
7.	"Serenade In Blue"	Harry Warren/Mack Gordon
8.	"Twilight Serenade"	Johnny Napton
9.	"Sleepy Serenade"	Lou Singer/Mort Greene
10.	"Serenata"	Leroy Anderson
11.	"Sultry Serenade"	Herbie Mann
12.	"Manhattan Serenade"	Louis Alter

==== 50 Memorable Melodies In Hi-Fi ====
Jack Pleis and His Orchestra (1958). 50 Memorable Melodies In Hi-Fi (LP). Decca. DL 8706.

No.	Title	Length
1.	"I Love My Baby" (Medley)
2.	"Oh! My Pa-Pa" (Medley)
3.	"Sweetheart Of All My Dreams" (Medley)
4.	"Melody Of Love" (Medley)
5.	"Red Sails In The Sunset" (Medley)
6.	"Mister Sandman" (Medley)
7.	"Drifting And Dreaming" (Medley)
8.	"Ole Buttermilk Sky" (Medley)
9.	"Tenderly" (Medley)
10.	"I'll Walk Alone" (Medley)

==== Music for Two Sleepy People ====
Jack Pleis and His Orchestra (1958). Music for Two Sleepy People (LP). Decca. DL 8763.

No.	Title	Writer(s)	Length
1.	"Two Sleepy People"	Hoagy Carmichael/Frank Loesser
2.	"Close Your Eyes"	Bernice Petkere
3.	"Hit the Road to Dreamland"	Harold Arlen/Johnny Mercer
4.	"Land Of Dreams"
5.	"Out Of My Dreams"
6.	"Lullaby In Rhythm"
7.	"I'd Love To Fall Asleep (And Wake Up In Your Arms)"
8.	"I'll Close My Eyes"	Billy Reid
9.	"Let's Put Out the Lights (and Go to Sleep)"	Herman Hupfeld
10.	"Lights Out"
11.	"And So To Bed"
12.	"Goodnight, Sweet Dreams"

==== Medley from The Musical "Through The Years" ====
Jack Pleis (1961). Medley from The Musical "Through The Years" (EP). Columbia Records. S7 31371.

Medley From The Musical "Through The Years"
No.	Title	Writer(s)	Length
1.	"Through The Years"	Edward Heyman/Vincent Youmans
2.	"You're Everywhere"	Edward Heyman/Vincent Youmans
3.	"Drums In My Heart"	Edward Heyman/Vincent Youmans

Medley From The Musical "I Married An Angel"
No.	Title	Writer(s)	Length
1.	"I Married An Angel"	Lorenz Hart/Richard Rodgers
2.	"Did You Ever Get Stung?"	Lorenz Hart/Richard Rodgers
3.	"Spring Is Here"	Lorenz Hart/Richard Rodgers

==== Stage Left, Stage Right ====
Jack Pleis (1961). Stage Left, Stage Right (LP). Columbia Records. CL 1662.

==== I Play the Songs the Whole World Sings ====
Jack Pleis (1976). I Play the Songs the Whole World Sings (LP). Ranwood Records. R8161.

No.	Title	Writer(s)	Length
1.	"I'll Always Be in Love With You"	Bud Green/Herman Ruby/Sam H. Stept	2:47
2.	"On Top of Old Smokey"	Traditional	2:13
3.	"And Now I've Found My Love"	Jack Pleis	2:24
4.	"You Are My Only Love"		2:48
5.	"Musetta's Waltz"	Giacomo Puccini	2:20
6.	"I Take This Vow"		2:28
7.	"Feelings"	Loulou Gasté/Morris Albert	2:45
8.	"Before the Next Teardrop Falls"	Venna Keith/Ben Peters	2:40
9.	"Trustful One"		2:15
10.	"Be Mine, Be Mine"	Jack Pleis	3:25
11.	"Tenemos Que Sufrir"	Julio Herrera	2:25
12.	"I Write the Songs"	Bruce Johnston	2:50

=== With Jan Savitt & the Top Hatters ===
- The Top Hatters (1939-1941). Jazz Heritage Series. Decca. 1967.

=== With the Henri René Orchestra ===
- RCA Victor Presents Eartha Kitt (RCA, 1953)
- That Bad Eartha (EP) (RCA, 1954)
- Down To Eartha (RCA, 1955)
- That Bad Eartha (LP) (RCA, 1956)
- Thursday's Child (RCA, 1957)

== See also ==
- Albums arranged by Jack Pleis
- Albums produced by Jack Pleis
