= Mel Carter =

American soul singer

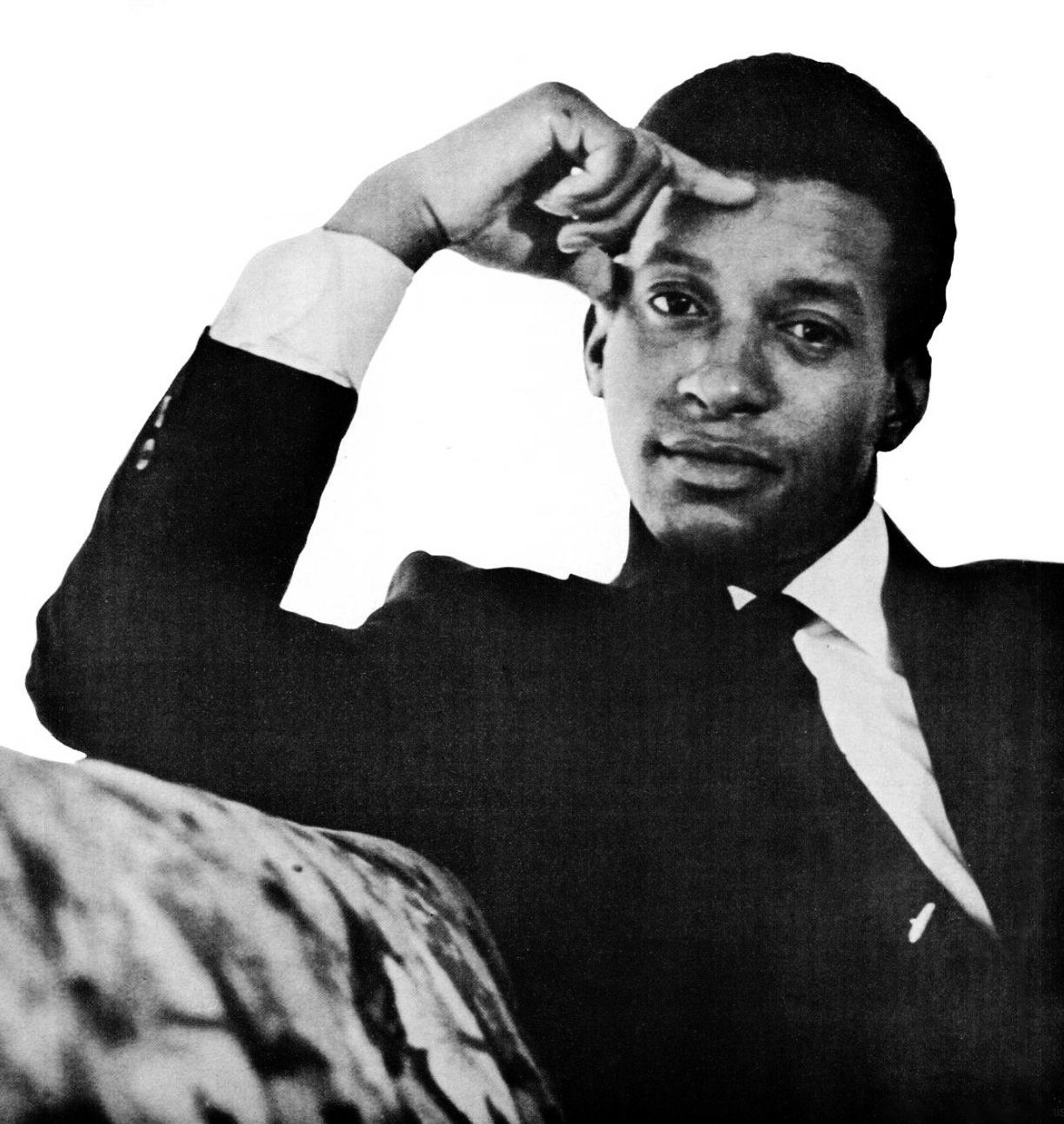
- Carter in 1966

Background information
- Born: April 22, 1939 (age 87); Cincinnati, Ohio, U.S.
- Genres: Soul, pop
- Occupations: Singer, actor
- Years active: 1960–present

Mel Carter (born April 22, 1939) is an American soul and pop singer and actor. He is best known for his 1965 million-selling recording "Hold Me, Thrill Me, Kiss Me".

== Biography ==
Carter was born in Cincinnati, Ohio. At age 16, he studied singing with vocalist Little Jimmy Scott. Carter recorded for Sam Cooke's SAR (Derby Records) in the early 1960s and had his first hit in 1963 at the age of 24 with "When a Boy Falls in Love", which was co-written by Cooke.

By the time he reached his commercial peak with Imperial Records in the middle of the decade, he was specializing in pop ballads. His biggest success was the Top 10 Billboard Hot 100 hit "Hold Me, Thrill Me, Kiss Me", which reached Number 8 in 1965. It sold over one million copies, and was awarded a gold disc. He had a couple of other Top 40 entries over the next year, "Band of Gold" and "All of a Sudden My Heart Sings", as well as a few other easy listening sellers.

Carter appeared on the DVD of the PBS special, Doo Wop 51, recorded in 2001 performing his hit; he also appeared on another PBS special, Magic Moments: The Best of 50s Pop, performing a tribute to Billy Williams ("I'm Gonna Sit Right Down and Write Myself a Letter") and Tommy Edwards ("It's All in the Game").

Carter later acted on television programs such as Good Times; Quincy, M.E.; Sanford and Son; Marcus Welby, M.D.; The Eddie Capra Mysteries as Albert Crane; CHiPs; and Magnum, P.I.; and in films such as Friday Foster (1975); Chesty Anderson, USN (1976); Prime Time a.k.a. American Raspberry (1977); and Angel (1984).

== Albums ==
Year	Album	Peak positions		Label
Year	Album	US 200	US CB	Label
1963	When A Boy Falls In Love	—	—	Derby
1965	(All Of A Sudden) My Heart Sings	—	—	Imperial
1965	Hold Me, Thrill Me, Kiss Me	62	67	Imperial
1966	Easy Listening	81	—	Imperial
1967	Be My Love	—	—	Liberty
1970	This Is My Life	—	—	Amos
1984	Willing	—	—	Onyx; International
1995	Live! In Hollywood	—	—	CSP
2008	The Heart & Soul Of Mel Carter	—	—	CSP

== Singles ==
Year	Title	Chart positions					Album
Year	Title	US	US AC	CA CHUM RPM	CA AC	AU	Album
1960	"I'm Coming Home" b/w "Sugar"	—	—	—	—	—	Non-album tracks
1961	"I Need You So" b/w "When I Grow Too Old To Dream"	—	—	—	—	—	Non-album tracks
1962	"Who Do You Love" (with Clydie King) b/w "The Wrong Side Of Town"	—	—	—	—	—	Non-album tracks
1963	"Wonderful Love" b/w "Time Of Young Love"	—	—	—	—	—	When A Boy Falls In Love
1963	"When A Boy Falls In Love"^{A} b/w "So Wonderful"	44	—	14	—	—	When A Boy Falls In Love
1964	"Why I Call Her Mine" b/w "Time Of Young Love"	—	—	—	—	—	When A Boy Falls In Love
1964	"Deed I Do" b/w "What's On Your Mind" (from Hold Me, Thrill Me, Kiss Me)	—	—	—	—	—	Non-album track
1965	"The Richest Man Alive" b/w "I'll Never Be Free"	104	—	—	—	—	Hold Me, Thrill Me, Kiss Me
1965	"I Just Can't Imagine" b/w "High Noon"	—	—	—	—	—	Hold Me, Thrill Me, Kiss Me
1965	"Hold Me, Thrill Me, Kiss Me" b/w "A Sweet Little Girl"	8	1	2	—	21	Hold Me, Thrill Me, Kiss Me
1965	"(All Of A Sudden) My Heart Sings" b/w "When I Hold The Hand Of The One I Love"	38	3	22	6	48	(All Of A Sudden) My Heart Sings
1966	"Love Is All We Need" b/w "I Wish I Didn't Love You So"	50	21	34	2	—	(All Of A Sudden) My Heart Sings
1966	"Band Of Gold" b/w "Detour" (from Hold Me, Thrill Me, Kiss Me)	32	1	38	—	—	(All Of A Sudden) My Heart Sings
1966	"You, You, You" b/w "If You Lose Her" (Non-album track)	49	11	38	—	—	Easy Listening
1966	"Take Good Care Of Her" b/w "Tar and Cement"	78	—	—	—	—	Easy Listening
1967	"As Time Goes By" b/w "Look To The Rainbow"	111	—	—	—	—	Non-album tracks
1967	"Edelweiss" b/w "For Once In My Life"	—	—	—	—	—	Non-album tracks
1967	"Enter Laughing" b/w "Star Dust" (Non-album track)	—	—	—	—	—	Enter Laughing (Soundtrack)
1967	"Be My Love" b/w "I Look Into Your Eyes"	132	23	—	—	—	Be My Love
1968	"Excuse Me" b/w "The Other Woman"	—	—	—	—	—	Be My Love
1968	"I Pretend" b/w "Didn't We"	—	38	—	—	—	Non-album tracks
1969	"San Francisco Is A Lonely Town" b/w "Everything Stops For A Little While"	—	—	—	—	—	This Is My Life
1969	"Another Saturday Night" b/w "Coming From You"	—	—	—	—	—	Non-album tracks
1970	"Kiss Tomorrow Goodbye" b/w "This Is Your Life"	—	—	—	—	—	This Is My Life
1973	"Do Me Wrong, But Do Me b/w "She Is Me"	—	—	—	—	—	Non-album tracks
1974	"I Only Have Eyes For You" b/w "Treasure of Love"	104	39	—	—	—	Non-album tracks
1976	"My Coloring Book" b/w "Put A Little Love Away"	—	47	—	—	—	Non-album tracks
1981	"You Changed My Life Again" b/w "I Don't Want To Get Over You"	—	—	—	12	—	Non-album tracks
1981	"I Don't Want To Get Over You" b/w "Who's Right, Who's Wrong"	—	—	—	—	—	Non-album tracks

- ^{A}"When a Boy Falls In Love" also peaked at #30 on R&B charts.
