= The Warm Touch =

Studio album by Harry Belafonte
- Released: 1971
- Recorded: RCA Studios A and B, New York City
- Genre: Pop
- Label: RCA Victor
- Producer: Jack Pleis

Harry Belafonte chronology
Belafonte By Request (1970)	The Warm Touch (1971)	Calypso Carnival (1971)

Professional ratings
Review scores
Source	Rating
Allmusic	2.5/5 stars

The Warm Touch is an album by Harry Belafonte, released by RCA Records in 1971.

== Track listing ==
1. "Something in the Way She Moves" (James Taylor) – 3:10
2. "Circle 'Round the Sun" (James Taylor) – 3:15
3. "The Paris Song" (Jake Holmes) – 3:19
4. "Louise" (Valentine Pringle) – 3:50
5. "No Regrets" (Tom Rush) – 3:41
6. "Cycles" (Gayle Caldwell) – 4:07
7. "The Circle Game" (Joni Mitchell) – 4:07
8. "Her Song" (Jake Holmes) – 3:45
9. "Rainy Day Man" (James Taylor) – 3:32
10. "Fare Thee Well" (Traditional, Fred Brooks) – 3:26

== Personnel ==
- Harry Belafonte – vocals
- Arranged and conducted by William Eaton (2, 4, 5, 7, 9, 10)
- Arranged and conducted by Robert Freedman (1, 3, 6, 8)

Production notes:

- Jack Pleis – producer
- Bob Simpson – engineer
