= Calypso Carnival =

Studio album by Harry Belafonte
- Released: 1971
- Recorded: RCA Studios A, New York City
- Genre: Pop
- Label: RCA Victor
- Producer: Jack Pleis

Harry Belafonte chronology
The Warm Touch (1971)	Calypso Carnival (1971)	Belafonte...Live! (1972)

Professional ratings
Review scores
Source	Rating
Allmusic	4/5 stars

Calypso Carnival is a studio album by Harry Belafonte, released by RCA Records in 1971. This was Belafonte's fifth and final Calypso album.

== Track listing ==
1. "Don't Stop the Carnival" – 5:00
2. "Chinita" (Ralph MacDonald, William Salter) – 3:29
3. "Trinidad Carnival Time" (MacDonald, Salter, Primes) – 4:12
4. "Lena" – 3:33
5. "Black And White (Together)" (MacDonald) – 3:14
6. "Out De Fire" – 3:45
7. "Season for Carnival" (MacDonald, Sealy) – 3:53
8. "Custer's Last Stand" (Dickson, Hall, Gary Romero) – 3:51
9. "Mango, Cocoanut, Sugar Cane" (MacDonald) – 4:04
10. "Elegant Donkey (Jackass)" (MacDonald) – 3:07

== Personnel ==
- Harry Belafonte – vocals
- Arranged and conducted by Ralph MacDonald
- Sivuca – accordion

Production notes:

- Jack Pleis – producer
- Bob Simpson – engineer
- Ralph MacDonald – arrangements
- Frankie Francis – arrangements
- William Eaton – arrangements
