= Beyond the Blue Horizon (song) =

1930 single by Jeanette MacDonald

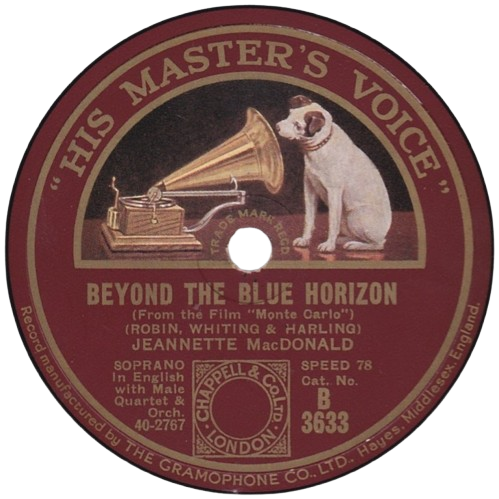

Single by Jeanette MacDonald
- A-side: "Always, in All Ways"
- Released: November 1930
- Recorded: August 4, 1930
- Studio: Hollywood Recording Studio
- Genre: Traditional pop
- Label: Victor
- Composers: Richard A. Whiting and W. Franke Harling
- Lyricist: Leo Robin

"Beyond the Blue Horizon" is a 1930 song composed by Leo Robin, Richard A. Whiting, and W. Franke Harling, and was first performed by Jeanette MacDonald in the 1930 film Monte Carlo. It was released that November as a single on a 78 rpm disc along with the song "Always, in All Ways" on Victor Records. Four takes were recorded on August 4 at the Hollywood Recording Studio, conducted by LeRoy Shield, with MacDonald and the vocal group The Rounders; the second take was chosen for release.

The song reached #9 in the United States and became MacDonald's signature song, selling over 12,000 copies; it was re-released in 1944. MacDonald would also perform it in the movie Follow the Boys in 1944, and frequently performed it on tours. She also re-recorded the song for the albums Favorites and Favorites in Hi-Fi (1959).

== Cover versions ==
- George Olsen and His Orchestra released a version in 1930. The song reached #5 in the United States.
- Phil Spitalny and His Orchestra released a version in 1930. The song reached #18 in the United States.
- Vincent Lopez released a version in 1932.
- Artie Shaw and His Symphonic Swing Orchestra recorded an instrumental version on 3 September 1941
- The Three Suns recorded the song for a music video-style short film in 1944.
- Clifford Jordan released a version on his 1957 album Cliff Jordan.
- Jack Pleis, His Piano, Chorus and Orchestra released a version in 1957 on his album Strings and Things.
- Jane Morgan - from her album Something Old, Something New, Something Borrowed, Something Blue (1958).
- The Ames Brothers included the song as the closing track on their 1958 album, Destination Moon.
- Frankie Laine - included in his album Call of the Wild (1962).
- Johnny Mathis released a version on his 1964 album The Wonderful World of Make Believe.
- Michael Nesmith released a version on his 1970 album Magnetic South and featured on his 1993 album Complete First National Band Recordings.
- In late 1973, Lou Christie released a version. The song reached No. 80 on the Billboard Hot 100 and No. 12 on the adult contemporary chart. It also reached No. 57 in Canada.
- Miharu Koshi released a version on her 1987 album Echo De Miharu.
- NXGHT! & DJ ZAP released a brazilian funk version.
- Casey Jones Costello released a version as the opening track on his 2022 album, America's Singing Sweethearts: A Tribute to Jeanette MacDonald and Nelson Eddy.

== In popular culture ==
- A version of this was the lead-in theme song for the old radio talk show Tex and Jinx (1948-1952).
- The boxing venue The Blue Horizon was renamed in 1961 after the song by Jimmy Toppi Sr.
- The song inspired the title of the Frederick Pohl novel Beyond the Blue Event Horizon.
- The song is featured in The Godfather Part III.
- The song is listed on the Great American Songbook as one of the best songs written from the 1920s through the 1950s.
- Alexander Courage stated he received inspiration from "Beyond the Blue Horizon" when writing "Theme from Star Trek".
- The song is heard in a 1978 TV commercial for the United States Virgin Islands Tourism Bureau.
- The song as recorded by Lou Christie was featured in the 1988 film Rain Man, and the 1991 film Dutch.
- The song is featured in the video game "Mafia".

== Book source ==
- Turk, Edward Baron (1998). Hollywood Diva: Biography of Jeanette MacDonald. Berkeley and Los Angeles: University of California Press. ISBN 978-0-520-22253-3.
