= Monte Carlo (1930 film) =

1930 film directed by Ernst Lubitsch

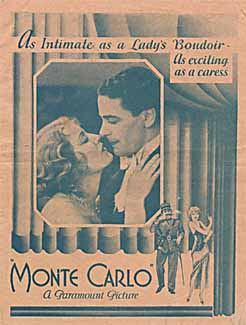
- theatrical poster
- Directed by: Ernst Lubitsch
- Written by: Ernest Vajda; Hans Müller-Einigen; Booth Tarkington; Evelyn Greenleaf Sutherland
- Produced by: Ernst Lubitsch
- Starring: Jack Buchanan; Jeanette MacDonald; Claud Allister
- Cinematography: Victor Milner
- Edited by: Merrill G. White
- Music by: W. Franke Harling
- Distributed by: Paramount Pictures
- Release date: August 27, 1930
- Running time: 90 minutes
- Country: United States
- Language: English

Monte Carlo is a 1930 American pre-Code musical comedy film, directed by Ernst Lubitsch. It co-stars Jack Buchanan as a French Count Rudolph Falliere masquerading as a hairdresser and Jeanette MacDonald as Countess Helene Mara. The film is notable for introducing the song "Beyond the Blue Horizon", which was written for the film and is first performed by MacDonald and a chorus on the soundtrack as she escapes on the train through the countryside. Monte Carlo was hailed by critics as a masterpiece of the newly emerging musical film genre. The screenplay was based on the Booth Tarkington novel Monsieur Beaucaire. Due to the film being published in 1930, it entered the public domain on January 1, 2026.

== Plot ==
Monte Carlo (1930)

Countess Helene Mara is about to be married to Duke Otto Von Liebenheim but leaves him at the altar. She flees on a train to Monte Carlo with her maid Bertha and 10,000 francs, and checks into an expensive hotel, planning to win a fortune at roulette. When she arrives at the casino—where she wins spectacularly and then loses everything—Count Rudolph Farriere takes a liking to her. She rejects the advances of this unknown admirer who sings to her over the telephone. He makes friends with her hairdresser, Paul, who lets slip the fact that she has no money. Rudy manages to gets close to her, with Paul's help, by posing as a hairdresser. He soothes her headache and she hires him, first as hairdresser, then as chauffeur and footman. Her confidence and liking for him grow.

Eventually, she confesses to him that she has no money and must fire him. At that moment, her former fiancé arrives and is actually delighted when she tells him she will marry him, but only for his money. She is so “different”. Rudolph tells the dispirited Mara that he has won a great deal of money at roulette and will help her. She gives him her last thousand francs. But the Duke is at the casino, and they run into the darkness. Two hours later, Countess Mara returns to the apartment dreamy and abstracted. She tells Bertha that they dined and danced and saw Monte Carlo. She sent him to the casino to play for her—and longs for his return. In his room in the servants quarters, Rudy adds the 1,000 franc note to the lock of her hair that he keeps in his pocket watch and retrieves 200,000 francs from his trunk to give to her as his “winnings”. They embrace and she locks the door of her bedroom, against her own desires. She promises a happy ending tomorrow. But she wakes in the morning full of regret. She is embarrassed in front of Bertha, who advises her to keep Rudolph at a distance from now on. Her cool, snobbish manner stops Rudolph from revealing his true identity. She returns the money. They quarrel. She surrenders to a kiss, and he walks out.

Rudolph contrives to dress her hair before the Duke takes her to the opera. He makes a mess of it. When she arrives at the theater, hair tidied, just before Act III, Rudolph is sitting in the opposite box. The Duke explains the plot. The opera is Monsieur Beaucaire (fictionalized to serve the plot points of the film). As Countess Mara and Rudolph make faces back and forth at each other, she realizes that Rudolph is using the opera to reveal some truth about himself. She goes to his box to ask the question to his face, “Are you a hairdresser?” She is about to ask for his forgiveness, expecting to be rejected, as Lady Mary is by the incognito prince in the film's version of the opera. (In the real opera, Beaucaire forgives Lady Mary and they plan to marry.)

“I don't like that ending,” Rudolph says, taking the weeping Countess in his arms. “I like happy endings.” Cut to the wheels of a speeding train. They look out of the compartment door, singing “Beyond the Blue Horizon,” and are joined by a chorus of people in the fields they are passing.

== Cast ==
- Jack Buchanan as Count Rudolph Falliere / Rudy
- Jeanette MacDonald as Countess Helene Mara
- Claud Allister as Duke Otto Von Liebenheim, her fiancé
- ZaSu Pitts as Bertha, her maid
- Tyler Brooke as Armand
- John Roche as Paul
- Lionel Belmore as Prince Gustav Von Liebenheim
- Albert Conti as Prince Otto's Companion
- Helen Garden as Lady Mary in Monsieur Beaucaire
- Donald Novis as Monsieur Beaucaire in Monsieur Beaucaire
- Erik Bey as Lord Windorset in Monsieur Beaucaire
- David Percy as Herald in Monsieur Beaucaire

== Music ==
The songs in the film were written by Richard Whiting and W. Franke Harling, with uncredited music by Karl Hajos, Herman Hand, Sigmund Krumgold, and John Leipold. The best-known song in the film is "Beyond the Blue Horizon" by Richard A. Whiting and W. Franke Harling, with lyrics by Leo Robin. The song became an immediate hit record for Jeanette MacDonald on the film's release and again in the 1970s when it was covered by Lou Christie.

Other songs in the film are:

- "Give Me A Moment Please"
- "Always in All Ways"
- "She'll Love Me and Like It"
- "Day of Days"
- "Trimmin' the Women"
- "Whatever It Is, It's Grand"

== Reception ==
According to Variety "If it were not for Jeanette MacDonald there would be no picture, this despite the disappointing direction of Ernst Lubitsch and the talker debut of England's Jack Buchanan".
