= "The Above Ground Sound" of Jake Holmes =

Studio album by Jake Holmes
- Released: June 1967
- Genre: Folk rock
- Length: 29:57
- Label: Tower

Jake Holmes chronology
"The Above Ground Sound" of Jake Holmes (1967)	A Letter to Katherine December (1968)

"The Above Ground Sound" of Jake Holmes is the debut album of American singer songwriter Jake Holmes, released in June 1967 on Tower Records. The album consists of songs played on bass and two electric guitars with no drummer. Both this record and Holmes' subsequent record, A Letter to Katherine December, were not well received and neither made the charts. Holmes played guitar. Tim Irwin also played guitar with Rick Randall on bass.

== "Dazed and Confused" ==
The album is best known for the song "Dazed and Confused" because Led Zeppelin released their interpretation of the song on their 1969 debut album Led Zeppelin. Jimmy Page, Led Zeppelin guitarist, was familiar with Holmes' song because his previous band, The Yardbirds, had covered the song. The Led Zeppelin song was not credited to Jake Holmes. While Holmes took no action at the time, he did later contact Page in regards to the matter but received no reply.

Starting in 2010, Jake Holmes filed multiple lawsuits against Page for copyright infringement regarding "Dazed and Confused." In August 2025, the case was settled out of court, with both sides informing the California court they had reached a written settlement. The terms and details of the agreement remain confidential.

== Track listing ==
All tracks composed by Jake Holmes

=== Side one ===
1. "Lonely" – 2:38
2. "Did You Know" – 2:52
3. "She Belongs to Me" – 2:15
4. "Too Long" – 2:47
5. "Genuine Imitation Life" – 4:00

=== Side two ===
1. "Dazed and Confused" – 3:53
2. "Penny's" – 2:39
3. "Hard to Keep My Mind on You" – 2:01
4. "Wish I Was Anywhere Else" – 2:50
5. "Signs of Age" – 4:02

== Personnel ==
- Jake Holmes - guitar, vocals
- Tim Irwin - guitar (uncredited)
- Rick Randall - bass (uncredited)
