= Belafonte Concert in Japan =

Live album by Harry Belafonte
- Released: 1974
- Recorded: March 18, 1974
- Venue: Nakano Sun Plazza Hall, Tokyo
- Genre: Pop
- Label: RCA Records

Harry Belafonte chronology
Play Me (1973)	Belafonte Concert in Japan (1974)	Turn the World Around (1977)

Professional ratings
Review scores
Source	Rating
Allmusic	3/5 stars

Belafonte Concert in Japan is a live album by Harry Belafonte, released in 1974. The album was Belafonte's final release for RCA Records, concluding a 21-year association with the label.

== Track listing ==
1. "Roll on Buddy" (Traditional) – 2:56
2. "Old Time Feeling" (Guy Clark) – 5:43
3. "John Henry" (Traditional) – 3:57
4. "We Had It All " (Guy Clark) – 3:52
5. "Empty Chairs" (Don McLean) – 5:32
6. "Mr. Bojangles" (Jerry Jeff Walker) – 6:01
7. "Marching To the Fair" (Morris Goldberg, Shunmugan Pillay) – 5:26
8. "Erene" (Georges Petsilas) – 3:56
9. "Carnival Medley: – 16:00
  1. "Don't Stop the Carnival"
  2. "Jean and Dinah" (Mighty Sparrow, Slinger Francisco)
  3. "Mama Looka Boo Boo" (Fitzroy Alexander)
  4. "Jump in the Line" (Stephen Somvel)
  5. "Marianne" (William Eaton)
  6. "Sly Mongoose"
  7. "Zombie Jamboree"
  8. "Man Piaba" (Harry Belafonte, Jack K. Rollins)
10. "Jamaica Farewell" (Lord Burgess) – 4:25
11. "Sakura" (Traditional, Marilyn Keith, Alan Bergman) – 3:42
12. "Day-O (Banana Boat Song)" (William Attaway, Harry Belafonte) – 2:40
13. "Matilda" – 5:22
14. Don't Stop The Carnival" – 5:03

== Personnel ==
- Harry Belafonte – vocals
- Sivuca – piano, accordion, guitar, organ
- Mervin Bronson – bass
- Scott Kuney – guitar, koto, bouzouki
- William Fontaine – guitar
- Michael Tobas – drums
- Angel Allende – percussion
- Falumi Prince – vocals, percussion
- Diane Greene – background vocals
- Barbara Young – background vocals
- Patricia Rosalia – background vocals
- Arthur Williams – background vocals
- Clark Salonis – background vocals
- Michael Sabbarese – background vocals

Production notes:

- John Cartwright – musical director, conductor
- Hideo Komuro – recording director
- Eiji Uchinuma – engineer, mixing
