= Dazed and Confused (Jake Holmes song) =

1967 song by Jake Holmes

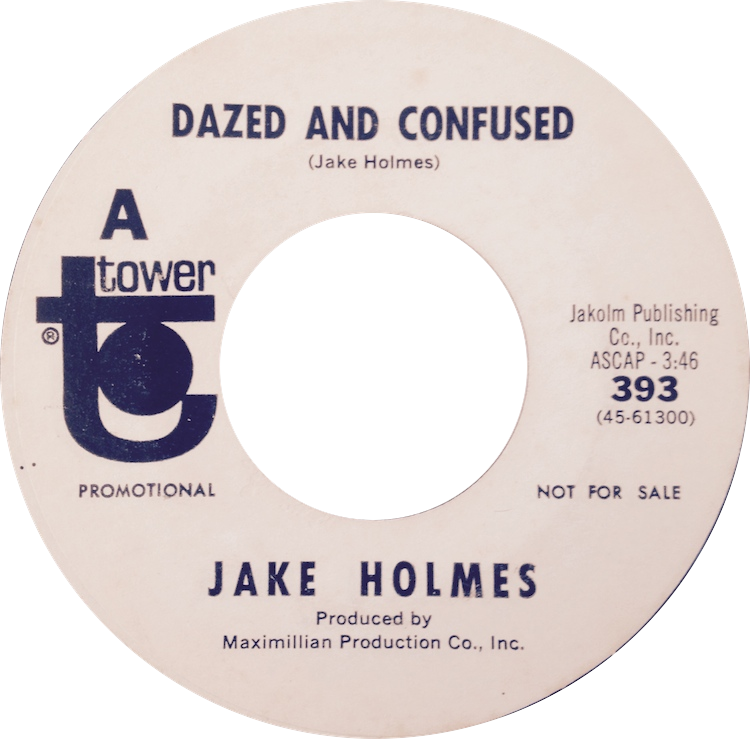
- 1968 promotional single label

Song by Jake Holmes

from the album "The Above Ground Sound" of Jake Holmes
- Released: July 10, 1967
- Recorded: Early 1967
- Genre: Folk rock
- Length: 3:46
- Label: Tower
- Songwriter: Jake Holmes

Audio sample
- file; help

"Dazed and Confused" is a song written by American singer-songwriter Jake Holmes in 1967. Performed in a folk rock-style, he recorded it for his debut album "The Above Ground Sound" of Jake Holmes. Although some concluded that it was about a bad acid trip, Holmes insists that the lyrics refer to the effects of a girl's indecision on ending a relationship.

After hearing Holmes perform the song in August 1967, English rock group the Yardbirds reworked it with a new arrangement. It soon became a centerpiece of their tours, several recordings of which have been released, including on Yardbirds '68, produced by guitarist Jimmy Page.

In 1968, "Dazed and Confused", with new lyrics and vocal line, was recorded by Page's new group Led Zeppelin and released on their debut album. It became a signature song and concert staple for much of the group's career. Holmes attempted to contact Page in the 1980s regarding the songwriting credit, but received no response.

Starting in 2010, Jake Holmes filed multiple lawsuits against Page for copyright infringement regarding "Dazed and Confused." In August 2025, the case was settled out of court, with both sides informing the California court they had reached a written settlement. The terms and details of the agreement remain confidential, but the settlement resolves the entire matter.

== Background and composition ==
Jake Holmes began his music career in the early 1960s, and recorded and performed with several different groups. He was influenced by psychedelic rock and groups such as the Byrds and the Blues Project, and wrote "Dazed and Confused" in a similar style with a blues influence. In early 1967, he recorded the song for his debut solo album "The Above Ground Sound" of Jake Holmes, as a trio of acoustic guitar, electric guitar, and bass. On July 10, it was released on the Tower Records label.

The arrangement is a modular dirge in the key of E minor built on a descending chromatic bass line alternating between the 3rd (E-G-F#-F-E) and the 7th (E-D-C#-C-B). Holmes' singing has been described as "pained", and the lyrics ("you're out to get me/you're on the right track") and ("I'm being abused/I'm better off dead"), coupled with the arrangement led some people to think the song was about a bad acid trip. However, Holmes said it was a song about a girl.

In August 1967, Holmes opened for the Yardbirds at a Greenwich Village gig in New York. According to Holmes, "That was the infamous moment of my life when 'Dazed and Confused' fell into the loving arms and hands of Jimmy Page." He was aware of the song appearing on Led Zeppelin's eponymous debut album less than two years later, but did not take any action at the time. In the early 1980s, he wrote to the group and asked for a co-credit, but received no reply.

In June 2010, Holmes sued Led Zeppelin guitarist Jimmy Page for copyright infringement, claiming to be the author of "Dazed and Confused." In court documents, he cited a 1967 copyright registration for the song, which was renewed in 1995. On January 17, 2012, the case was "dismissed with prejudice" (Note: "Dismissed with prejudice" signifies that the plaintiff/litigant (Holmes in this case) is permanently barred from filing another case on the same claim.) after the parties reached an undisclosed settlement out of court.

== The Yardbirds ==
=== Background ===
By late 1966, English rock group the Yardbirds had moved away from recording hit singles towards regular touring. In July 1967, they began their second tour of the US as a quartet, with Jimmy Page as the sole guitarist. The group performed at more countercultural venues, such as the Fillmore Auditorium in San Francisco. Their sets became more varied with extended medleys and featured guitar instrumentals by Page, such as "White Summer" and "Glimpses".

On August 25, 1967, the group headlined at the Village Theater in New York City, with opening acts the Youngbloods and Jake Holmes. Yardbirds drummer Jim McCarty was the only Yardbird to catch Holmes' performance. (Note: Several music writers indicate that the Yardbirds heard Holmes perform "Dazed and Confused" at the Cafe au Go Go and/or the Bitter End in New York's Greenwich Village, where he was playing around the same time.) He liked "Dazed and Confused" and bought the album the next day, subsequently playing it to the rest of the band. They reworked the song, focusing the arrangements based on the descending bass line. Page added additional guitar riffs in the middle of the song.

=== Rearrangement ===
The Yardbirds began to develop a new arrangement for "Dazed and Confused" while still on tour in the U.S. Holmes' brooding atmosphere and descending bass line were retained, as well as most of the lyrics. Page doubled the bass line, echoing Holmes' live performances with two acoustic guitarists. However, propelled by drums and an overdriven Fender Telecaster, the song quickly took on a new, distinctly non-folk sound.

Singer Keith Relf initially followed Holmes' verses, but later often changed the order or mixed lines from different verses. Led Zeppelin biographer Mick Wall feels that Relf only "slightly altered" the lyrics, while Page biographer Martin Power credits Relf with "writing new lyrics". Yardbirds chronicler Greg Russo describes that gradually the song "moved from Holmes' original lyrics to an alternate set of lyrics that combined words from Jake Holmes and Keith Relf."

The Yardbirds' major alterations were the instrumental breaks and an extended instrumental middle section. Writer-educator Susan Fast describes the breaks, appearing between the verses and after Page's solo, as "a detail that contributes significantly to the drama of the piece, creating enormous tension at the end of each verse before moving on to the next."

The song begins with bowed electric guitar phrasings by Page, answered by vocal and harmonica interjections by Relf. Page attributed the idea of using a violin bow on the guitar to a suggestion from violinist David McCallum, Sr., whom he met in his pre-Yardbirds days as a session musician. The bowed section gives way to Page's riff-laden guitar solo, propelled by a bass ostinato and fast driving 4/4-meter. The song returns to the slow tempo 12/8 verse structure before the coda. The Yardbirds' new arrangement, contributed by the four members, soon amounted to a major reworking of Holmes' original piece. Bassist Chris Dreja later said, "We found it, arranged it and played it. In a way, it was a great epitaph, because we were feeling very dazed and confused about what the hell was going on!"

=== Performances ===
"Dazed and Confused" was a regular part of the Yardbirds' performances during their final tours in 1967 and 1968. The song debuted during their short US tour in late 1967, which included a date at the Village Theater. When they returned to England, the group performed a nine-minute version in January 1968, around the time the full quartet recorded their last single, "Think About It". (Note: For the A-side, "Goodnight Sweet Josephine", producer Mickie Most replaced Dreja and McCarty with studio musicians Clem Cattini (drums), John Paul Jones (bass) and Nicky Hopkins (piano).) On March 5–6, the Yardbirds performed "Dazed and Confused" for BBC Radio. In his Led Zeppelin biography When Giants Walked the Earth, Wall notes that the relatively concise 5:48 version "sounds almost identical musically to the number Page would take credit for on the first Zeppelin album". (Led Zeppelin's studio version lasts 6:28.) Another short (5:46) performance was filmed by French television on March 9 for Bouton Rouge. AllMusic critic Bruce Eder notes it "comes off much better than the official [sic] Anderson Theater version from later the same month."

On March 28, 1968, the Yardbirds returned to New York to begin their final US tour. Before their March 30 concert at the Anderson Theater, representatives from Epic Records, the group's American label, informed them that it was going to be recorded for a live album. The group felt that it was not sufficiently prepared, but proceeded, with "Dazed and Confused" as their third number. Disappointed with the playbacks, the Yardbirds rejected any idea of releasing the recordings as a live album. However, after Page's rise to fame in Led Zeppelin, Epic released the album in 1971, with "Dazed and Confused" retitled "I'm Confused" (with no composer credit or performance rights organization). (Within a week, Page responded with an injunction, which prevented further sales of the album.) Although the recording and the group's performance is a bit rough, in a review Eder singled out the song as "something new, a slow blues as dark, forbidding, and intense as anything that the band ever cut – it showed where Page, if not his band, was heading." In 2017, Page remixed the Anderson Theater recordings and the song (with the correct title) was issued on Yardbirds '68.

=== Recordings and releases ===
The Yardbirds never attempted to record the piece in the studio. However, Page used an abbreviated version of his guitar solo from "Dazed and Confused" for the middle-section guitar solo of "Think About It".

Several live recordings of "Dazed and Confused" are in release. If the song was introduced, it was announced as "Dazed and Confused" – it is unknown why Epic re-titled it "I'm Confused".

- Unknown venue, England (January 1968) – Glimpses 1963–1968, released 2011
- BBC Radio broadcast, England (March 5–6, 1968) – Glimpses 1963–1968, released 2011
- Bouton Rouge television broadcast, France (March 9, 1968) – Cumular Limit, released 2000
- Anderson Theatre, New York City (March 30, 1968) – Live Yardbirds: Featuring Jimmy Page, released 1971, Yardbirds '68 (2017)
- Shrine Auditorium, Los Angeles (May 31 & June 1, 1968) – Last Rave-Up in L.A.

== Led Zeppelin ==
"Dazed and Confused"
- 1969 US radio promotional EP

Promotional single by Led Zeppelin

from the album Led Zeppelin
- A-side: "Babe I'm Gonna Leave You"
- Released: January 12, 1969
- Recorded: October 3, 1968
- Studio: Olympic, London
- Genre: Hard rock; heavy metal; acid rock
- Length: 6:27
- Label: Atlantic
- Songwriters: Jimmy Page, inspired by Jake Holmes (Note: Wording from 2014 reissue; originally credited to Page alone.)
- Producer: Jimmy Page

Official audio
- "Dazed and Confused " on YouTube

When the Yardbirds disbanded in 1968, Page planned to record the song in the studio with the successor group he had assembled that summer. According to Zeppelin bassist John Paul Jones, the first time he heard the song was at the band's first rehearsal session at Gerrard Street in London, in 1968: "Jimmy played us the riffs at the first rehearsal and said, 'This is a number I want us to do'." The future Led Zeppelin recorded their version in October 1968 at Olympic Studios, London, and the song was included on their self-titled debut album (1969). "Dazed and Confused" was the second song recorded at the Olympic sessions.

The group recorded the song in two takes. Page played a Telecaster and violin bow as he had performed it with the Yardbirds. (Note: Page only used a bow on a few Led Zeppelin songs, including "How Many More Times", "In the Light", and the intro to "In the Evening".) Singer Robert Plant wrote a new set of bluesier lyrics, according to Page, though Plant is not credited on the album, due to contractual obligations to CBS Records. Plant's vocal is raw and powerful, delivered with "unrelenting passion". Other than the lyrics and vocal, the song remained very similar to that performed by the Yardbirds earlier that year.

As of 2002, the 1969 promotional EP using "Babe I'm Gonna Leave You" as the A-side track and "Dazed and Confused" as B-side had been one of top ten Led Zeppelin music collectibles. A collector Rick Barrett, dedicated to his Led Zeppelin memorabilia, sold several copies of the promo EP for US$300–500 each, "depending on the condition of the sleeve and of the record itself," said Barrett.

In June 2010, Holmes filed a lawsuit in US federal court, alleging copyright infringement and naming Page as a co-defendant. The suit was "dismissed with prejudice" on January 17, 2012, after an undisclosed settlement between Page and Holmes was reached out of court in the fall of 2011. Subsequent Led Zeppelin albums, such as Celebration Day (2012) and the remastered and deluxe editions of the group's debut album (2014), expanded the songwriter's credit for "Dazed and Confused" to "By Page – Inspired by Jake Holmes."

=== Live performances ===
"Dazed and Confused" was the most regularly performed song by Led Zeppelin, appearing at over 400 concerts. It was played on every tour up to and including their 1975 shows at Earls Court. It was greatly expanded to include more improvisation, including short portions of other songs, and live performances could exceed 30 minutes. It was subsequently removed from their live set, although Page continued to perform parts of the bowed guitar segment during solo spots on subsequent tours, as preludes to "Achilles Last Stand" (1977 tour) and "In the Evening" (Knebworth 1979 and Tour Over Europe 1980). It was part of the group's set at the Ahmet Ertegun Tribute Concert on December 10, 2007.

A live version of "Dazed and Confused" recorded July 1973 at New York's Madison Square Garden was featured in the 1976 Led Zeppelin concert film The Song Remains the Same. Other live recordings are found on the following official releases:

- Led Zeppelin BBC Sessions (1997), two versions from 1969 and 1971.
- Led Zeppelin DVD (2003), three versions filmed, March 17, 1969 (Gladsaxe Teen Club, Denmark), March 25, 1969 (Staines Studio, London), June 19, 1969 (Olympia Theatre, Paris) and January 9, 1970 (Royal Albert Hall, London)
- How the West Was Won (2003), recorded June 25, 1972 (LA Forum)
- Celebration Day (2012), recorded at the Ahmet Ertegun Tribute.
- Led Zeppelin Deluxe Edition remastered series (2014), recorded at the Paris Olympia and released as a companion disc to the studio remaster.

=== Accolades ===
| Publication | Country | Accolade | Year | Rank |
|---|---|---|---|---|
| Rock and Roll Hall of Fame | US | "The Rock and Roll Hall of Fame's 500 Songs that Shaped Rock and Roll" | 1994 | * |
| Pause & Play | US | "Time Capsule Inductions – Songs" | 1998 | * |
| NME | UK | "117 Songs to soundtrack your summer" | 2003 | * |
| Toby Creswell | Australia | "1001 Songs: the Great Songs of All Time" | 2005 | * |
| Pitchfork | US | "The 200 Greatest Songs of the 1960s" | 2006 | 11 |
| Q | UK | "The 20 Greatest Guitar Tracks" | 2007 | 2 |
| Q | UK | "21 Albums That Changed Music – Key Track" | 2007 | 6 |

(*) designates unordered lists

=== Personnel ===
According to Jean-Michel Guesdon and Philippe Margotin:

- Robert Plant – vocals
- Jimmy Page – guitars, bow
- John Paul Jones – bass, organ
- John Bonham – drums

== See also ==
- List of Led Zeppelin songs written or inspired by others

== Notes ==
Footnotes

Citations

References

- Alexander, Phil (2017). Yardbirds '68 (Album notes). The Yardbirds. JimmyPage.com. JPRLPCD3.
- Bashe, Philip (1985). Heavy Metal Thunder: The Music, Its History, Its Heroes. Doubleday. ISBN 978-1-61579-045-6.
- Bream, John (2010). Whole Lotta Led Zeppelin: The Illustrated History of the Heaviest Band of All Time. Voyageur Press. ISBN 978-0-760-33955-8.
- Case, George (2009). Jimmy Page: Magus, Musician, Man – An Unauthorized Biography. New York City: Hal Leonard. ISBN 978-0-87930-947-3.
- Case, George (2011). Led Zeppelin FAQ: All That's Left to Know About the Greatest Hard Rock Band of All Time. Milwaukee, WI: Backbeat Books. ISBN 978-1-61713-025-0.
- Clayson, Alan (2002). The Yardbirds. San Francisco: Backbeat Books. ISBN 0-87930-724-2.
- Clayson, Alan (2006). Led Zeppelin: The Origin of the Species: How, Why and Where It All Began (1st. ed.). Chrome Dreams. ISBN 1-84240-345-1.
- Colby, Paul; Fitzpatrick, Martin (2002). The Bitter End: Hanging Out at America's Nightclub. Lanham, Maryland: Rowman & Littlefield. ISBN 978-0815412069.
- Davis, Stephen (1985). Hammer of the Gods (book). New York City: Ballantine Books. ISBN 0-345-33516-3.
- Fast, Susan (2001). In the Houses of the Holy: Led Zeppelin and the Power of Rock Music. Oxford, England: Oxford University Press. ISBN 978-0198033592.
- Guesdon, Jean-Michel; Margotin, Philippe (2018). Led Zeppelin All the Songs: The Story Behind Every Track. Running Press. ISBN 978-0-316-448-67-3.
- Hulett, Ralph; Prochnicky, Jerry (2011). Whole Lotta Led: Our Flight with Led Zeppelin. New York City: Kensington Publishing. ISBN 978-0806535555.
- Kaye, Lenny (1971). Live Yardbirds: Featuring Jimmy Page (Album notes). The Yardbirds. New York City: Epic Records. OCLC 33891308. E 30615.
- Lewis, Dave (1990). Led Zeppelin : A Celebration. Omnibus Press. ISBN 978-0-711-92416-1.
- Lewis, Dave (2004). The Complete Guide to the Music of Led Zeppelin. Omnibus Press. ISBN 0-7119-3528-9.
- Popoff, Martin (2018). Led Zeppelin: All the Albums, All the Songs, Expanded Edition. Voyageur Press. ISBN 978-0-760-36377-5.
- Power, Martin (2016). No Quarter: The Three Lives of Jimmy Page. London: Omnibus Press. ISBN 978-1783235360.
- Russo, Greg (2016) [1998]. Yardbirds: The Ultimate Rave-Up. Floral Park, New York: Crossfire Publications. ISBN 978-0-9791845-7-4.
- Russo, Greg; Paytress, Mark (2011). Glimpses 1963–1968 (Boxed set booklet). The Yardbirds. United Kingdom: Easy Action. OCLC 811355562. EARS 035.
- Shadwick, Keith (2005). Led Zeppelin: The Story of a Band and Their Music 1968–1980 (1st ed.). San Francisco: Backbeat Books. ISBN 0-87930-871-0.
- Tolinski, Brad (2012). Light and Shade: Conversations with Jimmy Page. Crown Publishing Group. ISBN 978-0-307-98573-6.
- Wall, Mick (2008). When Giants Walked the Earth: A Biography of Led Zeppelin. New York City: St. Martin's Griffin. ISBN 978-0-312-59039-0.
- Welch, Chris (1998). Led Zeppelin: Dazed and Confused: The Stories Behind Every Song. New York City: Thunder's Mouth Press. ISBN 1-56025-818-7.
