= Does Anybody Miss Me =

Studio album by Shirley Bassey
- Released: 1969
- Recorded: 1969
- Genre: Vocal
- Label: United Artists
- Producer: Dave Pell

Shirley Bassey chronology
This Is My Life (La vita) (1968)	Does Anybody Miss Me (1969)	Live at Talk of the Town (1970)

Professional ratings
Review scores
Source	Rating
AllMusic	3.5/5 stars

Does Anybody Miss Me is a 1969 album by Shirley Bassey. In 1969 Bassey moved her home to Lugano, Switzerland, with her second husband Sergio Novak, whom she had married in Las Vegas in August 1968. Remaining as a tax exile prevented her from performing and recording in the UK. In this period she continued to perform and record in Italy and the US. This album was recorded in the US and produced by the American producer Dave Pell, with arrangements by Artie Butler. The tracks on this album are a selection of standards and show tunes. The title track Does Anybody Miss Me was issued as a single in the UK, backed with the non album track Fa Fa Fa, but this failed to make any impression on the chart. Does Anybody Miss Me has remained part of her live show and was recorded as the opening track of the album Live At Talk Of The Town in 1970. This album saw Bassey re-record her 1958 UK #1 hit single As I Love You which she had previously released on the Philips label.

Also issued in the US as Does Anybody Miss Me there the album did not include the re-recording of As I Love You and Think Of Me. The original album was issued in mono and stereo. The stereo version of this album has been released on CD twice, firstly, in the late 1990s, on the EMI 2-CD set Shirley Bassey The Collection and a digitally re-mastered release for CD in 2009 together with This Is My Life by BGO Records.

== Track listing ==
Side One.

1. "Does Anybody Miss Me" (Les Reed, Johnny Worth) - 2.25
2. "I'll Never Fall in Love Again" (Burt Bacharach, Hal David) - 2.50
3. "Never, Never, No" (David Buskin) - 2.59
4. "Picture Puzzle" (Larry Grossman, Hal Hackady) - 2.33
5. "I Only Miss Him" (Carol Hall) - 2.27
6. "As I Love You" (Jay Livingston, Ray Evans) - 2.17

Side Two.

1. "Think of Me" (Fred Bongusto, Franco Migliacci, Jack Fishman) - 2.59
2. "(You Are) My Way of Life" (Carl Sigman, Bert Kaempfert, Herb Rehbein) - 2.21
3. "We" (Rod McKuen, Henry Mancini) - 3.04
4. "Give Me You" (Hal Hackady, Larry Grossman) - 2.25
5. "It's Always 4 A.M." (Sammy Cahn, Ron Anthony) - 3.25
6. "Hold Me, Thrill Me, Kiss Me" (Harry Noble) - 2.53

== Personnel ==
- Shirley Bassey – vocal
- Dave Pell – producer
- Noel Walker – producer (tracks 5 and 6)
- Artie Butler – arranger, conductor
- Ivor Raymond – arranger (tracks 5 and 6)
