= Allen & Grier =

Musical comedy duo

Allen & Grier is a folk rock parody duo that in 1963 released the comedy album Better To Be Rich Than Ethnic on Vee Jay Records. The duo consisted of musician Jake Holmes as Allen and his wife Katherine "Kay" Holmes as Grier. The two met at Bennington College and decided to write songs that mocked the popular folk music of the time. The result was an album that, according to interviews Jake Holmes has given, earned the pair the label "the most tasteless folk group ever" from Pete Seeger.

== Discography ==
Despite being billed as a folk act, Allen & Grier actually emulate various genres of music on their sole album, Better To Be Rich Than Ethnic. The title track, for example, is a straightforward comedy track in which the pair's WASPish mother explains the virtues of being white and privileged. The tracks "Teenage Mother" and "Hyena Baby" parody the pop music of the late 50s that was often favored by the teenybopper set. The album's final track is an intentionally grating cover of the song "Earth Angel". "The Ballad of the Camping Woodcutters" attempts to play on the sound of medieval ballads while at the same time making off-color puns. In fact, only "Grapefruits" and "Lonesome Traveler" sound like most folk music did at the time Allen & Grier were performing. One should note, furthermore, that the former of the two songs is intended to be a comedic song.

== Legacy ==
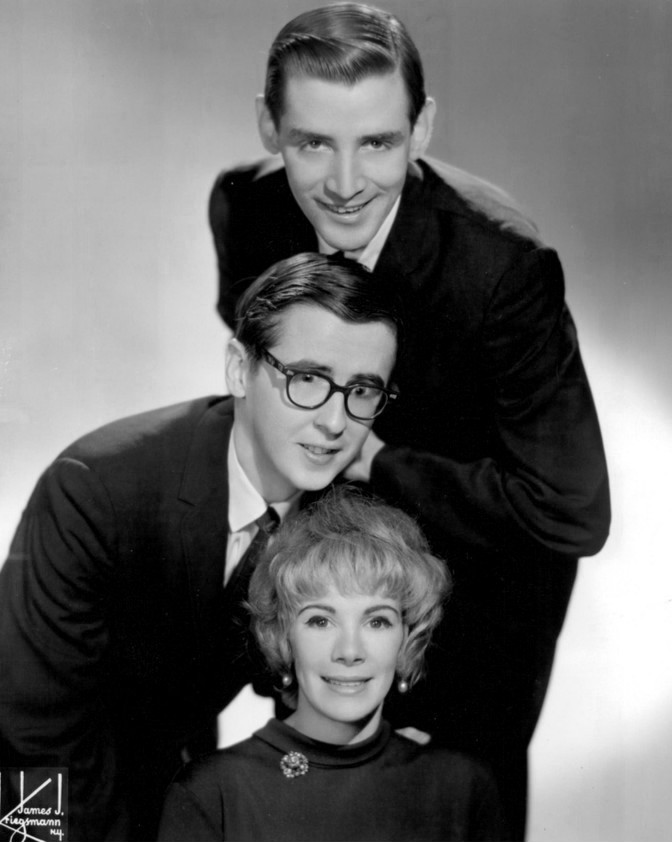
Jim Connell, Jake Holmes, and Joan Rivers when they worked as the team "Jim, Jake & Joan"

After moderate success with Better To Be Rich Than Ethnic, Katherine left Jake and the duo disbanded. Jake eventually formed a comedy act with Joan Rivers and Jim Connell called "Jim, Jake and Joan". Holmes' follow-up album, a serious solo effort titled A Letter to Katherine December, was released later. It dealt with the fall-out from his divorce.

Since the advent on the online music industry, Allen & Grier has seen some resurgence in popularity, as prints of the original vinyl album have long been hard to find.

The Culps, the married pair of middle school music teachers played by Will Ferrell and Ana Gasteyer on Saturday Night Live resemble Allen & Grier in their sound. Mrs. Culp in particular sounds like Grier. Also, both bands cover popular songs in quirkly, often irritating ways for the purpose of humor.
