= Moses Ngwenya =

South African pianist, keyboardist and musician

- Born: July 15, 1958 (age 67); Dube Village, Soweto, South Africa
- Known for: The Soul Brothers
- Children: 3

Black Moses Ngwenya (born 15 July 1958) is a South African pianist, keyboardist, and musician. He co-founded the Mbaqanga group The Soul Brothers in 1974 with South African singer and drummer, David Masondo. A book titled The Life and Times of Soul Brotherswas written by Sydney Maluleke. Maluleke said the book tells the story of how the band was formed, how their albums were composed, the loss of band members, why they are called kings of Mbaqanga, and what their music is all about.

== Background ==
=== Early life ===
Ngwenya was born on 15 July 1958 in Dube Village, Soweto, South Africa. His first musical endeavor was Crocodile Rock, a band formed with his older brothers, playing guitar then drums. Between 1974 and 1975 as a keyboard player, Ngwenya was part of touring or studio bands for Izintombi Zesi Manje Manje and Usizwe Namatshitshi (both of which were associated with talent scout Hamilton “Vala” Nzimande). Around this time, Ngwenya crossed paths with The Young Brothers, who were backing another Nzimande band, Udingane Namajongosi. Ngwenya and the Young Brothers hit it off, beginning to collaborate musically in addition to their main backing gigs and this would be the beginning of the legendary Soul Brothers. Ngwenya has also released many solo instrumental albums in addition to the group, as well as producing and playing on tracks and albums for various artists.

=== Career ===
Ngwenya's musical career began as a keyboardist for the band, the Groovy Boys, formed in KwaZulu-Natal in the 1970s. It was in Johannesburg where he joined with his friend to create the Soul Brothers, and David Masondo made the move from drums to lead vocals. The combination of Masondo's quavering soprano voice and Ngwenya's percussive Hammond organ playing gave the Soul Brothers a unique and instantly recognizable sound. This core rhythm section was typically augmented with a brass section, guitars, and multiple vocal harmonies.

== Honors ==
- Ngwenya was honored with the degree of Doctor of Philosophy (honoris causa) by Unisa.
