= David Masondo (singer) =

South African singer and drummer

David Mdavu Masondo (9 March 1949 or 1950 – 5 July 2015) was a South African singer and drummer. He was the lead vocalist of Mbaqanga group The Soul Brothers.

== Career ==
His musical career began as a drummer for band formed in KwaZulu-Natal in 1970 the Young Brothers. In the early 1970s, the Young Brothers moved to Johannesburg and met the keyboardist Black Moses Ngwenya and co-founded The Soul Brothers. In 1975, their breakthrough song, "Mshoza Wami", was released. The song was commercially successful, selling 60,000 copies within three months.

In September 2009, Masondo's solo album Nkosi Bathethelele, fused with Gospel elements, was released in South Africa.

== Legal issues ==
Masondo assaulted his wife Nomsa, and a case was opened. He was arrested on 7 February 2008 at Mofolo Park, Soweto, facing charges for assault and pointing a firearm at his wife.

== Personal life ==
Masondo died at Garden City Hospital in Mayfair, Johannesburg, on 5 July 2015, after suffering from fatigue.
