= Hold Me, Thrill Me, Kiss Me =

Song written and composed by Harry Noble

Single by Karen Chandler
- B-side: "One Dream"
- Released: 1952
- Genre: Traditional pop
- Length: 2:55
- Label: Coral
- Songwriter: Harry Noble

Karen Chandler singles chronology
"Hold Me, Thrill Me, Kiss Me" (1952)	"The Old Sewing Machine" (1953)

"Hold Me, Thrill Me, Kiss Me" is a song written by Harry Noble and originally performed by American singer Karen Chandler in 1952. It has been re-recorded several times since then, the most notable covers being by Mel Carter in 1965 and Gloria Estefan in 1994.

== Karen Chandler version ==
The original version was released by Karen Chandler in 1952, released by Coral Records. It first appeared on the US Billboard charts on October 25, 1952 and last appeared on April 11, 1953, peaking at number five on Billboard's chart of "Most Played by Jockeys", number seven on Billboard's chart of "Best Selling Singles", and number nine on Billboard's chart of "Most Played in Juke Boxes".

== Mel Carter version ==
"Hold Me, Thrill Me, Kiss Me"

Single by Mel Carter

from the album Hold Me, Thrill Me, Kiss Me
- B-side: "A Sweet Little Girl"
- Released: June 1965
- Genre: Pop; soul
- Length: 2:27
- Label: Imperial
- Songwriter: Harry Noble

Mel Carter singles chronology
"High Noon" (1965)	"Hold Me, Thrill Me, Kiss Me" (1965)	"(All of a Sudden) My Heart Sings" (1965)

The version most often associated with the song was recorded by American singer and actor Mel Carter, released in 1965 on Imperial. Carter's version spent 15 weeks on the US Billboard Hot 100, peaking at number eight, while reaching number one on Billboard's Easy Listening chart, number two on Canada's "RPM Play Sheet", and number four on Canada's CHUM Hit Parade.

=== Charts ===
==== Weekly charts ====
Chart (1965)	Peak position
Australia (KMR)	21
Canada Play Sheet (RPM)	2
Canada (CHUM Hit Parade)	4
US Billboard Hot 100	8
US Easy Listening (Billboard)	1
US Cash Box Top 100	12

==== Year-end charts ====
Chart (1965)	Rank
US Billboard Hot 100	14
US Cash Box Top 100	51

== Gloria Estefan version ==
"Hold Me, Thrill Me, Kiss Me"

Single by Gloria Estefan

from the album Hold Me, Thrill Me, Kiss Me
- Released: November 21, 1994
- Length: 3:21
- Label: Epic
- Songwriters: Harry Noble, Jr.
- Producers: Emilio Estefan, Jr.; Jorge Casas; Clay Ostwald

Gloria Estefan singles chronology
"Turn the Beat Around" (1994)	"Hold Me, Thrill Me, Kiss Me" (1994)	"Everlasting Love" (1995)

Music video
- "Hold Me, Thrill Me, Kiss Me" on YouTube

In 1994, Cuban-American singer and songwriter Gloria Estefan released a cover of "Hold Me, Thrill Me, Kiss Me", released in November 1994 by Epic Records as the second single (only in Europe and Australia) from her fourth solo album, Hold Me, Thrill Me, Kiss Me (1995). It was produced by Estefan's husband Emilio Estefan, Jr. with Jorge Casas and Clay Ostwald, and also included a new song, "If We Were Lovers", which is the English version of her 1993 hit "Con Los Años Que Me Quedan". "Hold Me, Thrill Me, Kiss Me" peaked at number one in Spain and Panama. In the UK, the single peaked at number 11 on the UK Singles Chart.

=== Critical reception ===
In a retrospective review, Maryann Scheufele from AXS wrote, "You can not help but move with this slow moving song. She uses every bit of her breath as she sings and she never hesitates to carry a note to completion. Music just dances around Gloria Estefan when she stays in one place to sing." Upon the release, a reviewer from Billboard magazine noted the "thrilling sounds" of the song, complimenting it as "elegant". Chuck Campbell from Knoxville News Sentinel named it a standout of the album, "on which Estefan shines through with sincerity". Music & Media wrote, "Raise the curtains please. Gloria excels on a ballad which is so big that it gets above the clouds, just like radio waves." Phil Shanklin of ReviewsRevues said, "The song is cheesy but Gloria seems aware of this and goes for broke by upping the drama."

=== Formats and track listings ===
Europe CD single (EPC 661080 1)
No.	Title	Writer(s)	Length
1.	"Hold Me, Thrill Me, Kiss Me"	Harry Noble, Jr.	3:21
2.	"Miami Hit Mix" (Dr. Beat, Conga, Rhythm Is Gonna Get You, 1-2-3, Get On Your Feet)	Enrique Garcia, Gloria Estefan, John DeFaria, Jorge Casas, Clay Ostwald	5:17

Europe CD-maxi single (661080 2)
No.	Title	Writer(s)	Length
1.	"Hold Me, Thrill Me, Kiss Me"	Harry Noble, Jr.	3:21
2.	"If We Were Lovers" (Con Los Años Que Me Quedan – English Version)	Gloria Estefan, Emilio Estefan, Jr.	4:35
3.	"Miami Hit Mix" (Dr. Beat, Conga, Rhythm Is Gonna Get You, 1-2-3, Get On Your Feet)	Enrique Garcia, Gloria Estefan, John DeFaria, Jorge Casas, Clay Ostwald	5:17

U.K. CD-maxi single 1 (661080 2)
No.	Title	Writer(s)	Length
1.	"Hold Me, Thrill Me, Kiss Me"	Harry Noble, Jr.	3:21
2.	"If We Were Lovers" (Con Los Años Que Me Quedan – English Version)	Gloria Estefan, Emilio Estefan, Jr.	4:35
3.	"Miami Hit Mix" (Dr. Beat, Conga, Rhythm Is Gonna Get You, 1-2-3, Get On Your Feet)	Enrique Garcia, Gloria Estefan, John DeFaria, Jorge Casas, Clay Ostwald	5:17

U.K. CD-maxi single 2 (661080 5)
No.	Title	Writer(s)	Length
1.	"Hold Me, Thrill Me, Kiss Me"	Harry Noble, Jr.	3:21
2.	"The Christmas Song (Chesnuts Roasting On An Open Fire)"	Mel Torme, Robert Wells	4:13
3.	"Let It Snow! Let It Snow! Let It Snow!"	Sammy Cahn, Jule Styne	3:55

U.K. cassette single (661080 4)
No.	Title	Writer(s)	Length
1.	"Hold Me, Thrill Me, Kiss Me"	Harry Noble, Jr.	3:21
2.	"Christmas Through Your Eyes"	Gloria Estefan, Diane Warren	4:49

U.K. 12-inch vinyl single (661080 6)
No.	Title	Writer(s)	Length
1.	"Miami Hit Mix" (Dr. Beat, Conga, Rhythm Is Gonna Get You, 1-2-3, Get On Your Feet)	Enrique Garcia, Gloria Estefan, John DeFaria, Jorge Casas, Clay Ostwald	5:17
2.	"Turn the Beat Around" (Damien's Foutainbleau Mix)	Peter Jackson, Gerald Jackson	7:18
3.	"Mi Tierra" (Pablo Flores' 12-inch Latin Club Mix)	Estéfano	6:45
4.	"Hold Me, Thrill Me, Kiss Me"	Harry Noble, Jr.	3:21

Australia CD-maxi single (661080 2)
No.	Title	Writer(s)	Length
1.	"Hold Me, Thrill Me, Kiss Me"	Harry Noble, Jr.	3:21
2.	"If We Were Lovers" (Con Los Años Que Me Quedan – English Version)	Gloria Estefan, Emilio Estefan, Jr.	4:35
3.	"Miami Hit Mix" (Dr. Beat, Conga, Rhythm Is Gonna Get You, 1-2-3, Get On Your Feet)	Enrique Garcia, Gloria Estefan, John DeFaria, Jorge Casas, Clay Ostwald	5:17

Australia cassette single (661080 4)
No.	Title	Writer(s)	Length
1.	"Hold Me, Thrill Me, Kiss Me"	Harry Noble, Jr.	3:21
2.	"If We Were Lovers" (Con Los Años Que Me Quedan – English Version)	Gloria Estefan, Emilio Estefan, Jr.	4:35
3.	"Miami Hit Mix" (Dr. Beat, Conga, Rhythm Is Gonna Get You, 1-2-3, Get On Your Feet)	Enrique Garcia, Gloria Estefan, John DeFaria, Jorge Casas, Clay Ostwald	5:17

=== Charts ===
==== Weekly charts ====
Chart (1994–1995)	Peak position
Australia (ARIA)	48
Europe (Eurochart Hot 100)	38
Europe (European Hit Radio)	28
Germany (Media Control)	97
Iceland (Íslenski Listinn Topp 40)	35
Ireland (IRMA)	22
Israel (Israeli Singles Chart)	29
Panama (UPI)	1
Scotland (OCC)	13
UK Singles (OCC)	11
UK Airplay (Music Week)	5

==== Year-end charts ====
Chart (1994)	Position
UK Singles (OCC)	80

=== Certifications ===
Region	Certification	Certified units/sales
United Kingdom (BPI)	Silver	200,000^{^}
^{^} Shipments figures based on certification alone.

== Other versions ==
A version was released by American singer Muriel Smith in 1953, which reached No. 3 on the United Kingdom's New Musical Express chart.

Sonny Til and The Orioles released an R&B version in 1953 (Jubilee 5108)

American singer Connie Francis included a memorable version on her 1959 album The Exciting Connie Francis.

Greek singer Nana Mouskouri released a version of the song produced by Quincy Jones in 1962.

Dick and Dee Dee released a version of the song on their 1966 album, Songs We've Sung on Shindig.

Shirley Bassey also covered the song on her 1969 album Does Anybody Miss Me.

In 1977, Bobby Vinton released a version of the song on the album The Name Is Love and as a single. Vinton's version reached No. 43 on Billboard's Easy Listening chart.

Hold Me, Thrill Me, Kiss Me was performed by She and Him and is featured on their fourth album Volume 3, in 2013.

Nelson Riddle instrumental orchestral version from the 1961 album "Love Tide".

== Influence ==
The song gave title for albums by Mel Carter (1965), Johnny Mathis (1977), and Gloria Estefan (1994), and was later referenced by U2's 1995 song "Hold Me, Thrill Me, Kiss Me, Kill Me", from the soundtrack of the film Batman Forever.

Mel Carter's version was featured in the film named after the song, Hold Me, Thrill Me, Kiss Me.

In the 1995 film, To Wong Foo, Thanks for Everything! Julie Newmar, a fragment of Johnny Mathis' recording backs an internal summit point.

== See also ==
- List of number-one adult contemporary singles of 1965 (U.S.)
