= Turn the World Around (Harry Belafonte album) =

Studio album by Harry Belafonte
- Released: 1977
- Genre: Folk
- Label: Columbia
- Producer: Harry Belafonte

Harry Belafonte chronology
Belafonte Concert in Japan (1974)	Turn the World Around (1977)	Loving You Is Where I Belong (1981)

Professional ratings
Review scores
Source	Rating
AllMusic	4.5/5 stars
The Encyclopedia of Popular Music	2/5 stars

Turn the World Around is an album by American singer Harry Belafonte, released in 1977.

After recording exclusively for RCA Victor since 1953, Belafonte signed with Columbia Records in the mid 1970s. Following a series of pop-oriented albums, Turn the World Around was Belafonte's return to interpreting folk songs of other cultures. Cary Ginell stated in his AllMusic review: "It is an absolute triumph and one of the finest albums of his career." Although recorded in the USA, Columbia/CBS did not issue the album domestically.

In 1979, the title track became the focus of one of the most acclaimed performances on the successful television series The Muppet Show, where Belafonte explained the artistic theme of the song before performing it with specially designed Muppets that resembled African tribal masks:

I discovered that song in Africa. I was in a country called Guinea. And I went deep into the interior of the county, and in a little village I met with a storyteller. And that storyteller went way back into African tradition, into African mythology, and began to tell this story about the fire—which means the Sun—and about the water and about the Earth. And he pointed out that all of these things, put together, turn the world around. And that all of us, we're here for a very, very short time. And in that time that we're here, there really isn't any difference in any of us if we were to take time out to understand each other. And the question is: Do I know who you are? Do you know who I am? Do we care about each other? 'Cause if we do, together we can turn the world around.

— Harry Belafonte on The Muppet Show, 1979

Series producer Jim Henson considered this production his favorite of the series and featured it in numerous retrospectives of his art; after Henson's death in 1990, Belafonte performed the song again at his memorial service.

== Track listing ==
1. "Marching to the Fair" (Morris Goldberg, Shunmugan Pillay) – 5:44
2. "Auntie Mary" (Count Bernadino) – 4:32
3. "Olga" (Fitzroy Alexander) – 3:48
4. "Goin' Down Jordan" (Theophilus Woods, Irving Burgie) – 5:34
5. "Sunbird" (Pat Rosalia, Robert McKinnon) – 4:05
6. "New York Taxi" (Fitzroy Alexander) – 5:38
7. "Can't Cross Over" (Irving Burgie) – 4:44
8. "A Hole in the Bucket" (Harry Belafonte, Odetta) – 8:46
9. "Turn The World Around" (Belafonte, Robert Freedman) – 4:28

== Personnel ==
- Harry Belafonte – vocals
- Falumi Prince – percussion, vocals on "A Hole in the Bucket & Auntie Mary"
- Dom Salvador – keyboards, musical director
- Keith Loving – guitar
- Scott Kuney – guitar
- Thelmo M. Porto – percussion
- Nana – percussion
- Dom Um Romão – percussion
- Steve Thornton – conga, bongos
- Brian Moore – keyboards
- Michael Tobas – drums
- Francisco Centeno – bass
- Gloria Agostini – harp
- Mauricio Smith – flute, saxophone
- Hal Archer – flute, saxophone
- Leopoldo Pineda – trombone
- Jose Rodrigues – trombone
- Howard Johnson – tuba
- Danny Cahn – trumpet
- Fred Jacobs – trumpet
- Babe Clarke – alto saxophone
- Larry Campbell – background vocals
- Vivian C. Cherry – background vocals
- Melvin Edmonston – background vocals
- Babi B. Floyd – background vocals
- Frank Floyd – background vocals
- Lani Groves – background vocals
- Milton Grayson – background vocals
- Hilda Harris – background vocals
- Pamela Kordon – background vocals
- Yvonne Lewis – background vocals
- Yolanda McCullough – background vocals
- Randy Peyton – background vocals
- Albertine Robinson – background vocals
- Maeretha A. Stewart – background vocals
- Gloria Turner – background vocals
- Betty Volenec – background vocals
- Arthur Williams – background vocals

Production notes:

- Harry Belafonte – producer
- Coleridge-Taylor Perkinson – vocal arrangements
- Kurt Munkacsi – engineer
- Vishek Woszczyk – mixing
- Eric Meola – photography
- Ed Lee – design
