= Johnny Austin =

American musician (1910–1983)

- Birth name: John A. Augustine
- Born: December 23, 1910; Vineland, New Jersey, U.S.
- Died: February 14, 1983 (aged 72)
- Genres: Jazz
- Instruments: Trumpet

Johnny Austin (December 23, 1910 – February 14, 1983) was an American jazz trumpeter from Vineland, New Jersey.

== Career ==
Austin played trumpet with the Glenn Miller Orchestra, parting ways with that band in 1939. He formed the Johnny Austin Orchestra in 1947. Austin's playing can be heard on recordings of Jan Savitt.
