= W. Franke Harling =

American classical composer

- Born: January 18, 1887; London, England
- Died: November 22, 1958 (aged 71)
- Occupation: Composer

William Franke Harling (January 18, 1887 – November 22, 1958) was a composer of film scores, operas, and popular music.

== Life and career ==
Born William Franke Harling in London, he was educated at the Grace Choir Church School in New York City. After working as an organist and choir director at the Church of the Resurrection in Brussels, he spent two years at the United States Military Academy at West Point, and composed both its hymn, called "The Corps," and its official march, "West Point Forever."

In 1918, Harling contributed incidental music to the Broadway production of the 1898 play Pan and the Young Shepherd by Maurice Hewlett. In 1926, he collaborated with Laurence Stallings on Deep River, a voodoo-themed opera set in New Orleans in 1835. It opened on Broadway at the Imperial Theatre on October 4 and ran for 32 performances.

Harling began his Hollywood career in 1928. His film credits include The Vagabond King, This Is the Night, So Big!, A Bill of Divorcement, Blonde Venus, A Farewell to Arms, The Bitter Tea of General Yen, Monte Carlo, Souls at Sea, and Penny Serenade.

Harling won the Academy Award for Best Music Scoring for Stagecoach (1939) and was nominated for Souls at Sea (1937) and Three Russian Girls (1944).

Harling's popular songs include "Beyond the Blue Horizon" (with Richard A. Whiting) popularized by Jeanette MacDonald in 1930 and Lou Christie thirty years later, and "Sing You Sinners", originally performed by Lillian Roth in 1930 and a hit for Tony Bennett in 1950.

Harling won the Bispham Memorial Medal Award for his jazz-oriented opera A Light from St. Agnes.

== Selected filmography ==
- Monte Carlo (1930)
- Every Woman Has Something (1931)
- Beauty and the Boss (1932)
- Penny Serenade (1941)

== Selected songs ==
- "Where was I", song by W. Franke Harling and Al Dubin performed by Ruby Newman and His Orchestra with vocal chorus by Larry Taylor and Peggy McCall 1939
