= Karen Chandler =

American singer (1923–2010)

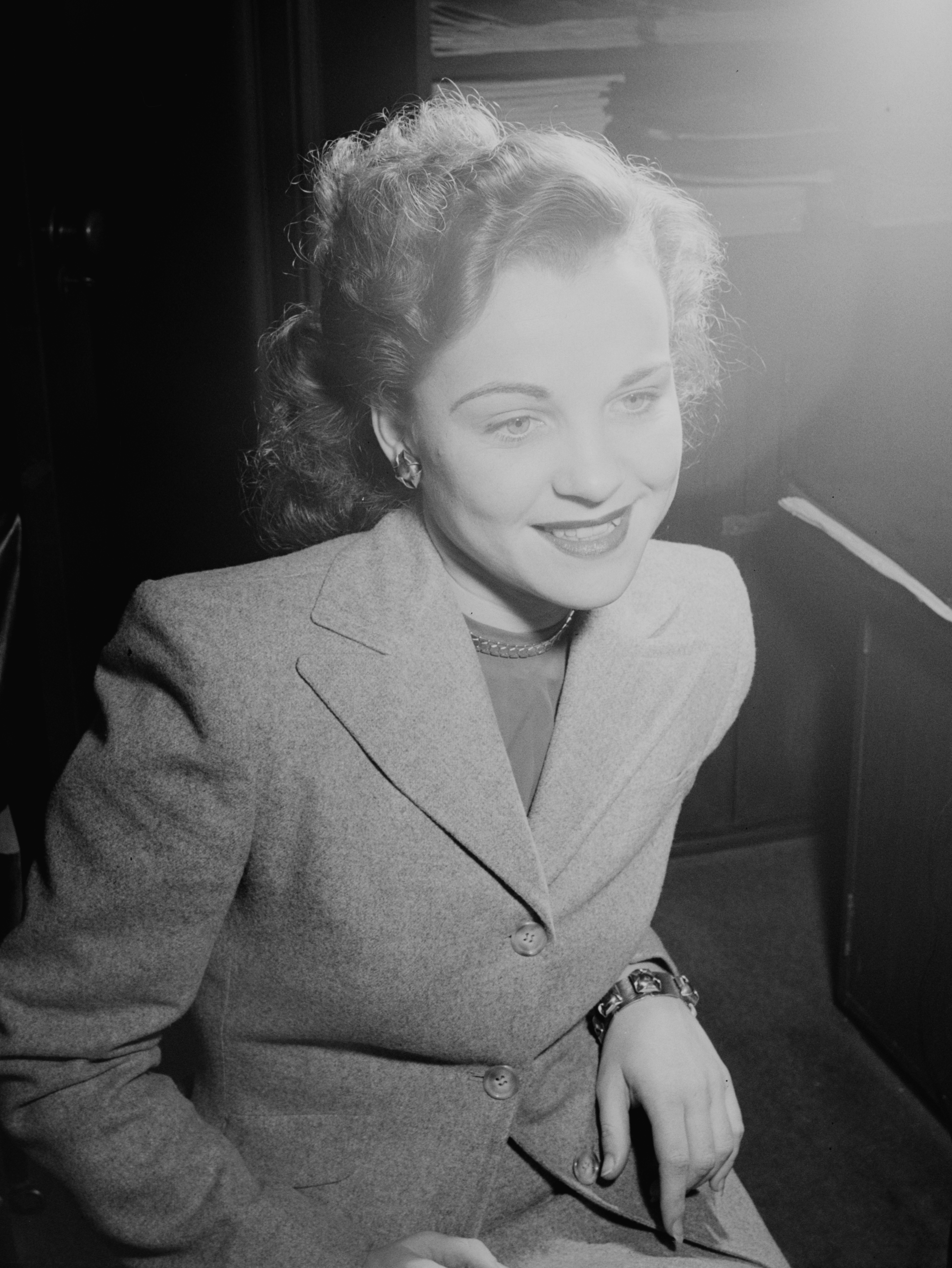
- Chandler (then Eve Young) in 1947

Background information
- Also known as: Eve Young
- Born: Eva Alice Nadauld; September 1, 1923; Rexburg, Idaho, U.S.
- Died: November 3, 2010 (aged 87) Los Angeles, California, U.S.
- Genres: Traditional pop
- Occupation: singer
- Years active: Mid 1940s – late 1960s
- Labels: Coral Records

Eva Alice Nadauld (September 1, 1923 – November 3, 2010), known professionally as Eve Young early in her career, and later as Karen Chandler, was an American singer of popular music during the 1940s, 1950s and 1960s, best known for her 1952 hit, "Hold Me, Thrill Me, Kiss Me".

== Early life, and singing career as Eve Young ==
Born on September 1, 1923, in Rexburg, Idaho to George Albert Nadauld and Lillian Canivet Young, she began her singing career under the name Eve Young while still a student at Brigham Young University. It is possible that the university's name influenced her choice of stage name. However, Young was her mother's maiden name; the Young family was well known for their musical talents and were called the "Singin' Swingin' Youngs".

She made her national debut on Benny Goodman's NBC radio showcase on July 8, 1946, singing "I Don't Know Why", and became the Goodman Orchestra's featured vocalist for the remainder of that year, enjoying success as his vocalist on "A Gal in Calico". By early 1947, she joined the cast of the television showcase Musical Merry-Go-Round and was subsequently signed to RCA Victor as a solo artist. She made her chart debut a year later with "Cuanto la Gusta" before recording "My Darling, My Darling" as a duet with the Drugstore Cowboys vocalist Jack Lathrop. Although both of these records were hits, her subsequent releases, such as "Laughing Boy" and "It's Me" achieved less success, and in 1950 RCA terminated her contract. In the UK, however, she had her biggest successes in that year, with "(If I Knew You Were Comin') I'd've Baked A Cake" and "Silver Dollar (Roll, Roll, Roll)", in both cases credited to Eve Young & The Homesteaders, each reaching the top of the UK sheet music charts in 1950. (Charts based on record sales did not start in Britain until 1952.)

== Later career ==
After signing a new contract with Coral Records, she emerged again in late 1952 under the name Karen Chandler. Her debut for Coral was the song "Hold Me, Thrill Me, Kiss Me", and it became an enormous hit. Selling over a million copies, it peaked at No. 7 on the Billboard chart. It was followed by a second single, "The Old Sewing Machine" b/w "I Hear the Music Now", which did not enjoy the same success. Her third release, "Goodbye Charlie, Goodbye" in the spring of 1953, fared better, reaching the Top 40, but two follow-ups, "Rosebud" and "Transfer", failed to make an impact. Chandler's final solo hit, "Why?" reached the charts in 1954.

Two subsequent recordings, "Positively No Dancing" and "Why Didn't You Tell Me?" were also unsuccessful, and in 1956 she changed genres, teaming up with country singer Jimmy Wakely for the duet "Tonight You Belong to Me". This was followed at the end of 1956 by another duet, "As Far as I'm Concerned", which this time paired Chandler with Eddie Reardon.

In 1957, she released two singles under the Decca label, "Love Is the $64,000 Question" (with her husband's Jack Pleis and His Orchestra) and "Free Little Bird", but with the rise in popularity of rock and roll, these largely went unnoticed. In the 1960s she made a small impression with "Lost And Found" (Tivoli, 1965, peaked at #141 in Record World), and then Karen Chandler had a minor comeback in 1967-68 with a revival of Hoagy Carmichael's "I Get Along Without You Very Well" on Dot. It reached No. 19 on Billboard's easy listening chart. She did not chart in the US again.

== Private life and death ==
Chandler married arranger Jack Pleis. They lived in New York City. There were three children and two grandchildren. After a erroneous report of her death in late October, Chandler died November 3, 2010, in Los Angeles.
