= Jan Savitt =

American bandleader, arranger, and violinist

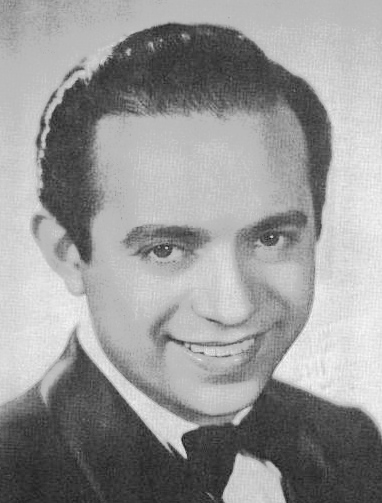

Background information
- Born: Jacob Sarvetnick; September 4, 1907; Shumsk, Russian Empire
- Origin: Philadelphia, Pennsylvania, USA
- Died: October 4, 1948 (aged 41) Sacramento, California
- Genres: Jazz
- Occupations: Bandleader, arranger, musician
- Instrument: Violin
- Formerly of: The Top Hatters
- Spouse: Barbara Ann Stillwell (m. 1940)

Jan Savitt (born Jacob Sarvetnick; September 4, 1907 – October 4, 1948), known as "The Stokowski of Swing", from having played violin in Leopold Stokowski's orchestra, was an American bandleader, musical arranger, and violinist.

== Early life and education ==
Savitt was born in Shumsk, (Note: Contemporary newspaper accounts state that he was born in Petrograd or Leningrad (i.e., Saint Petersburg).) then part of the Russian Empire (now part of Ukraine) and reared in Philadelphia.

He evidenced musical ability an early age and began winning conservatory scholarships in the study of the violin. He was offered the position of concert master in Leopold Stokowski's Philadelphia Symphony Orchestra, but turned it down, preferring to continue his studies at Curtis Institute. About a year later, believing himself ready, he joined Stokowski and the association continued for seven years, during which time Savitt gained further laurels as a concert soloist and leader of a string quartet.

== Family ==
Savitt was married to model Barbara Ann Stillwell from 1940 until his death in 1948, and had two daughters with her, one of whom, Jo Ann, was married to Joel Douglas, son of actor Kirk Douglas, from 2004 until her death in 2013.

== Career ==
In 1938, Jan Savitt & His Top Hatters broadcast from 5–5:30 pm every Tuesday, Wednesday, Thursday, and Friday as the KYW staff orchestra at KYW/NBC in Philadelphia. Saturday's weekly broadcast was one hour, coast-to-coast. The group also played at the Earl Theatre and performed with The Andrews Sisters and The Three Stooges.

He got his start in popular music some time later as music director of KYW, Philadelphia, where he evolved the unique "shuffle rhythm" which remained his trademark. Numerous sustaining programs created such a demand for the "shuffle rhythm" that Savitt left KYW to form his own dance crew.

Savitt's band was notable for including George "Bon Bon" Tunnell, one of the first African American singers to perform with a white band. Tunnell's recording with Savitt included Vol Vistu Gaily Star (co-composed by Slim Gaillard) and Rose of the Rio Grande. Helen Englert Blaum, known at the time as Helen Warren, also sang with Savitt during the war years.

Savitt and his orchestra had a bit role in the 1946 film High School Hero.

== Death ==
Shortly before arriving in Sacramento, California, with his orchestra on Saturday, October 2, 1948, for a concert scheduled for that evening at Memorial Auditorium, Savitt was stricken with a cerebral hemorrhage and taken to Sacramento County Hospital. Savitt died on October 4, with his wife at his bedside. He is buried in Forest Lawn Memorial Park (Glendale) California

== The Top Hatters ==
These musicians played with Savitt as The Top Hatters:

Al Leopold, Charles Jensen, Cutty Cutshall, Ed Clausen, Frank Langone, Gabe Gelinas, George White, Harold Kearns, Harry Roberts, Howard Cook, Irv Leshner, Jack Hansen, Jack Pleis, James Schultz, Johnny Austin, Johnny Warrington, Maurice Evans, Morris Rayman, Sam Sachelle.

== Discography ==
- The Top Hatters (1939–1941), Decca Jazz Heritage Series, 1967
