= Hello Muddah, Hello Faddah! =

Hello Muddah, Hello Faddah! may refer to:

- Hello Muddah, Hello Fadduh (A Letter from Camp), a novelty song by Allan Sherman and Lou Busch
- Hello Muddah, Hello Faddah! (book), a children's book based on the song
- Hello Muddah, Hello Faddah! (musical), a musical revue based on the song
