= Bunny hop =

Bunny hop can refer to:

- Bunny hop (dance), a novelty dance from the 1950s
- Bunny hop (cycling), in cycling, a trick that involves the rider lifting their bike over an obstacle while remaining on the bike and in motion
- Bunny hopping, in video games, a technique used to increase movement speed and control by jumping repeatedly while moving forward
- Bunny hop jump, in figure skating, typically the first jump learned by beginning skaters
- Bunnyhop, an alternative name of American rapper Tyler, the Creator
