= My Son, the Nut =

Studio album by Allan Sherman
- Released: 1963
- Genre: Comedy music
- Length: 33:56
- Label: Warner Bros.
- Producer: Jimmy Hilliard

Allan Sherman chronology
My Son, the Celebrity (1963)	My Son, the Nut (1963)	Allan in Wonderland (1964)

Singles from My Son, the Nut
- 1. "Hello Muddah, Hello Fadduh (A Letter from Camp)" Released: July 6, 1963

Professional ratings
Review scores
Source	Rating
Allmusic	5/5 stars
Record Mirror	4/5 stars

My Son, the Nut is the third album by Allan Sherman, released by Warner Bros. Records in 1963. The album held the top spot on the Billboard 200 for nearly two months, from August 31 to October 25, 1963. It stayed on the charts for 140 weeks and sold 1.2 million copies. My Son, the Nut was also the last comedy album to hit #1 on the Billboard 200 for over half a century, until "Weird Al" Yankovic's Mandatory Fun in 2014.

While Sherman's first two albums, My Son, the Folk Singer (1962) and My Son, the Celebrity (1963), had been filled with in-jokes about Jewish culture, the parodies on this album were more general.

== Track listing ==
Side one

1. "You Went the Wrong Way, Old King Louie" ("La Marseillaise," "You Came a Long Way from St. Louis," and the Peter Gunn theme)
2. "Automation" ("Fascination")
3. "I See Bones" ("C'est si bon")
4. "Hungarian Goulash No 5" ("Brahms Hungarian Dance Number 5")
5. "Headaches" ("Heartaches")
6. "Here's to the Crabgrass" ("Country Gardens") (duet with Jacqueline Ward)

Side two

7. "Hello Muddah, Hello Fadduh! (A Letter from Camp)" ("Dance of the Hours")
8. "One Hippopotami" ("What Kind of Fool Am I?"")
9. "Rat Fink" ("Rag Mop")
10. "You're Getting to Be a Rabbit with Me" ("You're Getting to Be a Habit with Me")
11. "Eight Foot Two, Solid Blue" ("Five Foot Two, Eyes of Blue")
12. "Hail to Thee, Fat Person" (spoken, with an instrumental rendition of "America the Beautiful" behind it)

== Chart history ==
Chart performance for My Son, the Nut
Year	Chart	Position
1963	Billboard Pop Albums (Billboard 200)	1
