= Crazy Downtown =

Single by Allan Sherman
- B-side: "The Drop-Outs March"
- Released: March 1965
- Genre: Novelty Song, Parody Music
- Length: 2:40
- Label: Warner Bros. Records 5614
- Composer(s): Tony Hatch
- Lyricist(s): Allan Sherman

Allan Sherman singles chronology
"Hello Mudduh, Hello Fadduh! (A Letter from Camp) (1964 Version)" (1964)	"Crazy Downtown" (1965)	"The Drinking Man's Diet" (1965)

"Crazy Downtown" is a song written and performed by Allan Sherman. The song is a parody of Tony Hatch's song "Downtown" which was a hit for Petula Clark (because of the use of the melody, Hatch also receives songwriting credit). The song reached #6 on the U.S. Adult Contemporary chart and #40 on the Billboard Hot 100 in 1965; it was Sherman's last top-40 hit.

The song is sung from the point of view of a father whose teenaged children have gone "frooging" downtown with their car and money. At first, the parents are relieved that they can now use the phone and the bath tub but, as the hours pass, they get increasingly nervous. Meanwhile their offspring frug to the songs of Petula Clark while they are downtown. Eventually, the parents take Miltown in order to calm themselves down. However the father gets a phone call telling him that their children have been arrested as the result of a car accident, prompting him to angrily borrow someone else's car to get his sons home. He then vows to ground the teenagers and go downtown with his wife, where he promises to do "very nice dances" including the tango, waltz, foxtrot, and bunny hop, instead of the dances of the younger generation such as the Frug, the Swim, the Mashed Potato or the Jerk.
