= Peter and the Commissar =

Studio album by Allan Sherman
- Released: 1964
- Recorded: July 22, 1964
- Genre: Comedy
- Length: 45:22
- Label: RCA Victor Red Seal
- Producer: Peter Dellheim

Allan Sherman chronology
Allan in Wonderland (1964)	Peter and the Commissar (1964)	For Swingin' Livers Only! (1964)

Peter and the Commissar is a 1964 musical comedy album by Allan Sherman, recorded live with Arthur Fiedler conducting the Boston Pops Orchestra and five guest jazz musicians. The title track pokes fun at communism in the Soviet Union, and is a spoof of Peter and the Wolf by Sergei Prokofiev, with original spoken rhymed verse by Sherman.

== Track listing ==
=== Side One ===
1. "Peter and the Commissar" (24:16)

=== Side Two ===
1. "Introduction" (3:10)
2. "Variations On How Dry I Am" (9:28) (hiccups solo by Arthur Fiedler)
3. "The End Of A Symphony" (8:00)
