= You Came a Long Way from St. Louis =

Song
- Released: 1948
- Composer: John Benson Brooks
- Lyricist: Bob Russell

"You Came a Long Way from St. Louis" is a popular song composed by John Benson Brooks, with lyrics by Bob Russell. The lyric is addressed to a social climber from St. Louis, as seen by a fellow Missourian who concludes, "You came a long way from St. Louis / But, baby, you still got a long way to go."

The song was originally recorded by Ray McKinley, and released in 1948. In subsequent years, the song was recorded by numerous artists, including Pearl Bailey, Bing Crosby, Rosemary Clooney, Peggy Lee and George Shearing, Perry Como, June Christy, Chris Connor, Della Reese, Chuck Berry, Tom Jones, Marvin Gaye and Mary Wells, and Ann-Margret.

== Popular culture ==
- The song was performed by Peggy King in the film Abbott and Costello Meet the Mummy (1955).
- It was parodied by Allan Sherman as "You Went the Wrong Way, Old King Louie"—about Louis XVI and the French Revolution—on his 1963 album My Son, the Nut.
