= The Rape of the A*P*E* =

Book by Allan Sherman

- Cover of first edition
- Author: Allan Sherman
- Original title: The Rape of the A.P.E. (American Puritan Ethic : The Official History of the Sex Revolution, 1945-1973 : The Obscening of America, an R.S.V.P. Document)
- Language: English
- Genre: Non-fiction
- Published: 1973 Playboy Press
- Publication place: United States
- Media type: Print (Hardback & Paperback)
- Pages: 410 pp
- OCLC: 252868519

The Rape of the A*P*E* is a satirical book that was written by the musician and satirist Allan Sherman. It was commissioned and published by Playboy Press, in July 1973. The acronym A.P.E. in the title is interpreted in more than one way, including “American Puritan Ethic.” The book’s lengthy subtitle — The Official History of the Sex Revolution 1945–1973: The Obscening of America. An R.S.V.P. Document — contains an abbreviation for “Redeeming Social Value Pornography.”

The Rape of the A*P*E* includes an account of the history of sexuality as always tending toward repression. The main focus of the book, though, is the sexual revolution that emerged in the United States during the 1960s.

The book was the subject of much publicity, when it appeared, due to both its subject and author. Despite his ill health at the time, Sherman went on a two-week media tour to promote The Rape and appeared on many radio shows. He died on November 20, 1973, four months after the book’s release while still on a publicity tour; he died from multiple health complications related to his obesity, leading to lung failure.

== Development ==
The Rape of the A*P*E* was originally conceived through a contract Allan Sherman gained with Playboy. In the December 1971 issue of Playboy appeared a short story by Sherman titled "Griselda and the Porn-O-Phone." The protagonist, Griselda Thrindle, was born and raised in puritan Wisconsin; her janitor father dreams of Griselda's becoming a charwoman. Griselda then comes upon a phone sex hotline and her world changes forever, as she finds herself addicted to the debaucherous lifestyle. The article did well enough with the public that Playboy then commissioned Allan Sherman to write an entire book in a similar vein.

== Publication ==
In the year prior to the book's release, Sherman participated in a publicity tour for this book. Even though Playboy had originally commissioned the book, Sherman began to express to others that he had reason to believe that Playboy wasn't promoting the book to the level he considered adequate for a successful release. During this time Sherman had resurfaced in the public eye. He had begun working in live performances as well as providing animation voice-overs. This intensity of exposure caused him to rise out of temporary obscurity, performing onstage golf-centric stand-up comedy and doing small roles, such as the narration for Dr. Seuss's “Green Eggs and Ham.” Sherman's golf stand-up routine specifically caught the eye of Warner Bros., and they picked him up for an album with a $5,000 advance, with a promise that Allan would begin recording as soon as his tour promoting The Rape of the A*P*E* concluded.

The Rape of the A*P*E* had three primary publication editions: the original Playboy Press public release in 1973, the 1978 Jove mass public paperback release, and the Buccaneer Books hardback re-release in 1991.

== Reception ==
The Rape of the A*P*E* received mixed reception upon its release. One positive review wrote: “Cloaked in disappointing opening and closing sections, this is a book in disguise. Its central 310 pages are neither stupid nor hypocritical.” Negative reviews described the book as “rambling, myopic,” and “more or less a view of the sexual revolution through the eyes of a middle-aged Hollywood Cynic.”

== Quotation ==
While The Rape of the A*P*E* may not have had the cultural impact Sherman intended it to have, the book has been referenced in many other places. In Regina Barreca's 1995 book Perfect Husbands (& Other Fairy-tales), Rape of the A*P*E* is directly quoted in the chapter "Why is God a Bachelor?" Sherman is quoted on the contradiction of God sanctifying marriage only to remain a bachelor himself, as well as tackle the outdated perception of men overwhelming women to sweep them off their feet and sex with her is laying claim to her being, as well as discuss how such fantasies just aren't true to reality.

In Adi Da Samraj's 1984 The Transmission of Doubt, a book about scientistic materialism, the entirety of the chapter "Conversations with Testoob, the Science Man," is borrowed with credit. "Conversations with Testoob, the Science Man" is a dialogue between two people, Testoob the science man and the Sap the first man, in a discussion of how science consists in "transforming nature into useful things," and the gradual progression of possession in the name of answers until humans are in control of everything, removing any need for a God — if there even was one in the first place.

== Bibliography ==
- Sherman, Allan. (1973). “Rape of the A*P*E*: The Official History of the Sex Revolution 1945–1973: The Obscening of America. An R*S*V*P* Document.” (1st ed.) [Physical]. Playboy Press. (OCLC 252868519)
