= Bunny hop (dance) =

Type of dance

The bunny hop is a novelty dance created at Balboa High School in San Francisco in 1952. Ray Anthony co-wrote and recorded an eponymous song in 1952 and an instrumental in 1953.

== History ==
The dance has been generally done to Ray Anthony's big band recording of his eponymous composition in 1952. It was a vocal hit in 1952, reaching no. 13 on Billboard and no. 34 on Cash Box, and instrumentally re-recorded in 1953. The song has been re-recorded by others, including musical updates of the style, for example, a salsa version. Duke Ellington recorded "Bunny Hop Mambo" in 1954. Other popular music of the era is also used, such as "The Glow-Worm". The Applejacks and The Champs have also recorded the tune.

In 1979, several men were arrested for public lewdness during the Village Station police raid for dancing in a bunny hop.

Ray Anthony's single release of the "Bunny Hop" featured another novelty dance classic, the "Hokey Pokey" on the B side.

== Description ==
The dance is a variation on a conga line. Participants dance in a line or a circle, holding on to the hips of the person in front of them. They tap the floor two times with their right foot, then with their left foot, then they hop forwards, backwards, and finally three hops forward to finish the sequence, which continues throughout the tune. The first person in the line or the open circle leads the group around the floor.

== Variations ==
The letkajenkka from Finland has essentially the same steps.

In 2014 in Saudi Arabia, the same dance set to slightly different music (referred to as "raqsat al-batriq", the "penguin dance") became a popular trend on online video-sharing sites and a staple at wedding dance parties.

== In popular culture ==
- The Merrie Melodies cartoon short Hare Brush ends with Elmer Fudd (who's under the delusion that he is a rabbit) performing the dance.
- Allan Sherman listed the bunny hop as "a very nice dance" at the coda of his parody "Crazy Downtown", along with older dances such as the tango and waltz (as opposed to modern dances such as the Frug).
- The Ray Anthony version is heard in John Waters' film Cry-Baby with Baldwin and the Whiffles hopping.
- The bunny hop is shown in the pilot episode of Family Ties when Alex attends a country club event and mentioned again in the episode "Karen II, Alex 0".
- In The Fresh Prince of Bel-Air episode "Fresh Prince After Dark", Carlton is seen doing the bunny hop at the Playboy Mansion.
- In the Everybody Loves Raymond episode "The Walk to the Door", Robert Barone dances to the bunny hop at a family wedding.
- In the Newhart episode "Jumpin' George", George Utley dances the bunny hop in the lobby area, to keep from falling asleep and having a recurring dream.
- In The Addams Family Musical, the living Addams clan joins with their newly-risen deceased ancestors in doing the bunny hop (along with line-dancing and The Twist).
- In The Golden Girls episode "Even Grandmas Get the Blues", Sophia describes the ritual dance in the Festival of the Dancing Virgins as "like the bunny hop, except you cross your legs."
