= Village Station police raid =

1979 raid on US gay bar

Coordinates: 32.811°N 96.8115°W

The Village Station police raid was a police raid that targeted the Village Station, a gay bar in Dallas, Texas, United States. The raid occurred on October 25, 1979, and saw several bar patrons arrested for public lewdness while performing a bunny hop dance. The raid and the subsequent court cases involving those arrested are considered an important moment in the LGBT history of Dallas, with the impact it had on the city compared to that of the Stonewall riots of 1969.

By the 1970s, Dallas's Oak Lawn neighborhood had become the city's gay village, and was home to several nightclubs and bars that catered to the LGBT community and had become the target of repeated police raids and other forms of discrimination. The Village Station was one such club, having relocated in mid-1979 after being destroyed in a 1976 arson. The 1979 raid, which occurred just before 1 a.m., led to the arrest of about ten patrons. (Note: Sources disagree slightly over the number of individuals who were arrested during the raid. According to an article in This Week in Texas that was published a week after the raid, eleven patrons and one bartender had been arrested. Both D Magazine and Advocate Magazine stated in articles published in the 2010s that twelve people who were doing the bunny hop dance were arrested. However, a 2018 article in the Dallas Voice stated that ten men had been charged with public lewdness, while the bartender was charged with violating a liquor law. Additionally, a December 1979 article in This Week in Texas that pulled its information from an article in The Dallas Morning News stated that 15 people had been arrested for public lewdness, though the article also stated that the raid had occurred on October 23.) While those arrested in similar Oak Lawn raids had usually pleaded guilty to avoid publicity, the Village Station raid was notable in that several arrestees fought the charges in court, leading to unprecedented public support from the local LGBT community and significant local news coverage. The events coincided with an increased push among Dallas's LGBT community for greater rights and less discrimination.

== Background ==
In the 1970s, the Texas city of Dallas saw a growth in its LGBT community, primarily in the neighborhood of Oak Lawn, and with this growth came a number of entertainment venues that catered to them. During this time, many gay bars were founded in the area, with one of these being the Old Plantation, a disco bar located on Cedar Springs Road that had been established in 1976. By the late 1970s, the club (renamed Village Station in 1979) was one of the most popular venues in the city, with D Magazine calling it "the hottest bar in town". However, the club had also faced a number of problems, including legal issues, harassment from police, and an arson attack that had completely destroyed the club in 1976, leading it to reopen at a new location at the intersection of Cedar Springs and Throckmorton in mid-1979. For several years, the bar was targeted by the D. L. Burgess, head of the Dallas Police Department's vice squad, who often led police raids on the club. However, by 1979, Burgess had left the police department, and, regarding the relationship between the club and police, an article in D Magazine said that the club "has maintained generally good relations with the police, who make spot checks regularly; the beat cops will occasionally stop in, chat with the bartenders, and take in the sights".

== Police raid ==
Shortly before 1 a.m. on October 25, 1979, several members of the Dallas Police Department entered the building, ordering the doorman not to interfere. Once inside, the officers met with undercover police officers who were already in the building and began arresting individuals. Several patrons were arrested on charges of public lewdness, while a bartender was also arrested. The lewdness charges came from the fact that the patrons were performing a bunny hop dance.

== Aftermath ==
The morning after the raid, the general manager of the Village Station posted bail for arrested individuals who could not afford it, which cost them $2,693. He also announced that he would be filing a civil lawsuit against the city of Dallas, and he began seeking out witnesses who had been at the club the night of the raid. Within a week of the raid, a member of the Dallas Bar Association's Goals for Dallas Committee met with Dallas Police officials and stated their opposition to the continuing raids on gay bars in the city, and while the police stated that their actions did not constitute harassment of the gay community, a story published two weeks later in the Dallas Times Herald included interviews with vice squad members that seemingly refuted these statements. On January 28, 1980, over 600 individuals attended a meeting concerning the raid, with an assistant city attorney urging members of the group to file complaints with the police department's internal affairs division. Highlighting the general attitude in the gay community at the time, a large piece of graffiti saying "STOP POLICE HARASSMENT" was written on the side of the Village Station building.

=== Court cases ===
By January 1980, the bartender's case had been dismissed, while two of the arrested patrons pled guilty to misdemeanor charges. In February, two defendants were found not guilty after several undercover officers were unable to corroborate their testimony, disagreeing over such things as the layout of the club. These later decisions were made by Dallas Criminal Court Judge Chuck Miller. Displeased at the outcomes, Dallas County District Attorney Henry Wade attempted to dismiss the remaining six cases and reassign them to the more conservative Judge Ben Ellis, though Miller opposed these efforts and accused Wade of "forum shopping", with the Dallas Bar Association agreeing with Miller. Miller regained the cases, but shortly thereafter relinquished them, stating that the accusation of bias "creates the possibility of a cloud hanging over whatever verdicts are reached by this trial judge in these cases". Additionally, Wade agreed to randomly reassign the cases to other judges after an official inquiry into his forum shopping had been drafted. By the end of 1980, most of the cases returned guilty verdicts for the accused, though at least two of these verdicts were later dismissed. In one case, the defendant's lawyer urged the people in the courtroom to dance to the disco song "No More Tears (Enough is Enough)", which had been playing in the club at the time of the raid. The incident was covered in a front-page story by The Dallas Morning News with the headline "Bible totters watch a parade of perverts".

=== Legacy in local LGBT community ===
In a 2018 article, the Dallas Voice called the police raid "Dallas's Stonewall" and "a turning point for the LGBTQ citizens of Dallas". A 2010 article in D Magazine similarly stated the importance of the event in the LGBT history of the area, stating, "The October 25, 1979, police action changed Dallas, because for the first time, the persecuted fought back, providing a rallying point for the gay community in Dallas". According to Dallas attorney Don Maison, who represented two of the accused individuals in the subsequent court trials, "The raid and its aftermath sparked a dialogue between the police department and the gay community that hadn’t existed before. It later led the police department to assign a liaison officer to the gay community. It changed the whole relationship between the community and law enforcement". While the mainstream media in Dallas did not cover the initial raid, they did cover the subsequent trials, due in large part to the fact that several of the arrested fought their charges. In the aftermath of previous raids, many who were arrested opted to plead guilty to avoid publicity out of fear of losing their jobs. According to D Magazine, this was the first time in the history of the Dallas LGBT community that those arrested in a raid fought their charges.

In a 1980 article, the LGBT magazine This Week in Texas called 1979 "the most violent year ever in the gay communities of Montrose and Oak Lawn" and highlighted the Village Station and Club Dallas lawsuits as examples of LGBT organizations fighting back against discrimination. In the aftermath of the raid, the LGBT community in Dallas began to press for increased rights and against discrimination. Gay publications in the area began to publish the names and badge numbers of police officers who had targeted LGBT people. In November 1979, Dallas schoolteacher Don Baker, with support from the Texas Human Rights Foundation, initiated a class action lawsuit at the federal level to challenge the state's sodomy law. The next month, Club Dallas, another gay bar in the city, filed a lawsuit against law enforcement officials at both the city and county level, alleging that they had harassed their patrons. In January 1980, the Gay Political Caucus met with city leaders, including Dallas Mayor Robert Folsom, to discuss LGBT issues, with Folsom requesting follow-up meetings to learn more about issues facing the LGBT community. In the early 1980s, the Village Station closed, but it reopened in a new location in 1987.
