= Ziegfeld Follies of 1919 =

Revue produced by Florenz Ziegfeld Jr.

The Ziegfeld Follies of 1919 was a revue produced by Florenz Ziegfeld Jr. Billed as the thirteenth edition of the Ziegfeld Follies series, it had a tryout at Nixon's Apollo Theatre in Atlantic City, New Jersey, on June 10, 1919 and opened at Broadway's New Amsterdam Theatre on June 16, 1919 and closed on December 6, 1919. It is often considered to be the best and most successful of the Follies series produced by Ziegfeld.

The revue's musical director was Frank Darling. Orchestrations for Buck and Stamper numbers were by Stephen O. Jones (1880–1967). Costumes were selected by Ziegfeld from creations of Lucy, Lady Duff-Gordon (known as "Lucile") for the following scenes: "The Harem," "The Drinks and Syncopated Cocktail" chorus gowns and Marilyn Miller's "Springtime" dresses. Schneider-Anderson Company executed designs by O'Neill, McGeachy and Cook for "The Salad", "Shimmy", "Minstrel", "Tulip Time", "Salvation Army", "Spanish", Widows (in Prohibition scene). Hickson designed costumes for "Sweet Sixteen Melody" and "Baby Arms". The costumes In Ben Ali Haggin's first act arrangement were made by Frances, New York. Men's costumes were by Dazian & Co. Uniforms were by Brooks Uniform Company. The scenic construction was by B. McDonald Construction Company.

== Program and songs ==
Act 1

- Episode 1: "The Follies Salad"
  - Song: "The Follies Salad" sung by Eddie Dowling (as Chef)
  - Cast: Lettuce: M. Sinclair, Spice: Marcelle Earl, Oil: Helen Lyons, Sugar: Kathryn Perry, Paprika: Lucille Levant, Chicken: May Hay, Salt and Pepper: The Fairbanks Twins, Follies Girl of 1919: Florence Ware
- Episode 2: "Hail to the Thirteenth Folly," tableau by Ben Ali Haggin
  - Cast: The New Folly: Jessie Reed, Her Twelve Sisters: Hazel Washburn, Martha Pierre, Bernice Dewey, Margaret Irving, Ethel Hallor, Ruth Taylor, Florence Crane, Betty Morton, Corene Paynter, Mary Washburn, Nan Larned and Simone D'herlys.
- Episode 3: "A Pet"
  - Cast: Mary Hay and Phil Dwyer
- Episode 4: "A Spanish Frolic" written by Rennold Wolf
  - Cast: Announcer: Eddie Dowling, Picador: Jack Lynch, Matador: Wesley Pierce, Toreador: Johnny Dooley, Carmen: Ray Dooley, Bull (fore): William; (aft): Willie Newsome
- Episode 5: "My Baby's Arms,"
  - Song: "My Baby's Arms" music by Harry Tierney, lyric by Joseph McCarthy,
  - Cast: sung by Delyle Alda, assisted by Lucille Levant, Kathryn Perry, Mary Haye, Florence Ware and the Fairbanks Twins.
- Episode 6: "Sweet Sixteen"
  - Song: "Sweet Sixteen" lyric by Gene Buck, music by Dave Stamper
  - Cast: sung by Marilyn Miller assisted by Mildred Sinclair, Bernice Dewey, Mary Washburn, Marcelle Earle, Martha Wood, Lois Davison, Corene Paynter, Lola Lorraine, Monica Boulais, Mable Hastings, Madeline Wales, Minnie Harrison, Viola Clarens, Helen Shea, Olive Vaughn and Edna Lindsey
- Episode 7: "The Popular Pests" by Gene Buck and Dave Stamper
  - Cast: Waiter: Eddie Dowling, Janitor: Bert Williams, Subway guard: Gus Van, Hall boy: Joe Schenck, Check Boy: Johnny Dooley, Taxi Driver: Eddie Cantor, Servant Girl: Ray Dooley
- Episode 8: "Tulip Time"
  - Song: "Tulip Time" by Gene Buck and Dave Stamper
  - Cast: sung by John Steel and Delyle Alda assisted by Misses Taylor, Foster, Jesmer, Fitzgerald, Squire, Young, Lamar, Kendall, North, Thomas, Page, Davis, Leisy, Barnes, Lamorte and Martin.
- Episode 9: "He Seldom Misses" written by Rennold Wolf (with suggestions by George LeMaire)
  - Cast: Sure-Shot Dick: George Lemaire, Jasper Slocum: Bert Williams, Prairie Nell: Emily Drange
- Episode 10: "The World Is Going Shimmy Mad" by Gene Buck and Dave Stamper
  - Cast: sung by Johnny and Ray Dooley assisted by Misses Clarens, Lindsay, Ray, Hastings, Bertram, Haver, Baron, Lorraine, Lyon, John, E. Wallace Johnstone, Warfield, Chittenden, Bryant and Lygoe.
- Episode 11: "The Apostle of Pepe"
  - Cast: Eddie Cantor
- Episode 12: "I Want to See a Minstrel Show"
  - Cast: Eddie Dowling
- Episode 13: "The Follies Minstrels" words and music by Irving Berlin
  - Song: "Mandy" words and music by Irving Berlin, sung by Van and Schenck, later by Ray Dooley
  - Cast: Tambo: Eddie Cantor, Bones: Bert Williams, Middle Man: George Lemaire, Quartet: First Tenor: Joe Schenck, Second Tenor: John Steel, Baritone: Johnny Dooley, Bass: Gus Van, Entire company: Follies Girls and Boys, George Primrose: Marilyn Miller, "Mandys" headed by Doris Levant and Helen Shea, with Misses Haver, Vaughn, Clarens, Lindsay, Ray, Hastings, Garrick and Braham, "Dandys": Joe Evans, George Burggraf, William Shelly, Jack Lynch, Eddie Syms, William Mathews, John Ryand and Willie Newsome

Act 2

- Episode 1: "Harem Life" by Irving Berlin,
  - Cast: sung by Delyle Alda: Ladies of the Harem: Misses Davis, Squire, Martin, Barnes, LaMort, M. Callahan, and Foster, Cleopatra: Dorothy Richardson, favorite Wives (in order of their appearance): Misses Helen Leisy, Helen Jesmer, Gladys Colby, Ethel Callahan, Florence Crane, Ruth Taylor, Nan Larned, and Emily Drange, dancers of the Harem: Misses Clarens, Lindsay, Shea, Ray, Baron and Wallace, a Dancer: Doris Levant
- Episode 2: "I Am the Guy Who Guards the Harem" words and music by Irving Berlin
  - Cast: sung by Johnny Dooley
- Episode 3: Songs: Bert Williams
- Episode 4: "The Circus Ballet," music by Victor Herbert
- Cast: danced by Marilyn Miller; Ringmaster: Emily Drange, clowns: Misses Ray, Garrick, Lorraine, John, Wood, Johnstone, Chittenden, Bryant, Warfield, Douglas, Young and E. Wallace, bare-Back riders: Misses Vaughn, Clarens, Lindsay, Shea, Hastings, Garrick Lyons, Haver, Bertram, Johnstone, North and Baron
- Episode 5: "A Pretty Girl Is Like a Melody" words and music by Irving Berlin
  - Cast: sung by John Steel, Humoresque: Florence Crane, Spring Song: Ruth Taylor, Elegy: Dorothy Richardson, Barcarolle: Ruth Foster, Serenade: Helen Jesmer, Traumerei: Emily Drange
- Melody, Fantasy, and Folly of Years Gone By, a picture by Ben Ali Hagen
  - Cast: The Lady of Coventry (i.e. Lady Godiva): Gladys Colby, Her Handmaidens: Misses Larned, Foster, Lamorte, Davis, Vaughn and John, The Heralds: Fairbanks Twins, The Jester: Tracy Budington, The Guards: Joe Evans, George Burgraff, William Shelly, John Ryan, Jack Lynch, Eddie Sims, William Mathews and Willie Newsome
- Episode 6: "At the Osteopath's" written by Rennold Wolf (with suggestions by Eddie Cantor)
  - Cast: Dr. Cheeseboro Simpson: George Lemaire, Percival Fingersnapper: Eddie Cantor, Orchid Swan, a stenographer: Marie Wallace, A Visitor: Emily Drange
- Episode 7 [part 1]: "Prohibition" words and music by Irving Berlin
  - Cast: Father Time: Eddie Dowling, mourners: Misses Fitzgerald, Squire, Martin, Page, Lesly and Barnes, liquor lovers: Messrs. Chalmers and King, Jack Waverly, bartenders: Van and Schenck and Joe Evans, George Burggraf, William Shelly, Jack Lynch, John Ryan, Eddie Sims, William Mathews and Willie Newsome, "Chorus Girls": Misses Crane, Taylor, Drange, Larned, Foster, Jesmer, Lamorte and Richard, "The Working Man": Addison Young, "Our Boys From Over There": Barnard Carples, Ray Klages, Otis Harper, Kenneth Lawrence, Jack Waverly and Tracy Buddington
  - Song: "You Cannot Make your Shimmy Shake On Tea", lyrics by Rennold Wolf and Irving Berlin, music by Irving Berlin, sung by Bert Williams
- Episode 7 [part 2]: A Saloon of the Future
  - Song: "The Near Future" words and music by Irving Berlin
  - Cast: A Customer: John Steel, The Waiter: Eddie Cantor, Cocoa Cola: Florence Crane, Sarsaparilla: Nan Larned, Grape Juice: Heoen Jesmer, Lemonade: Emily Drange, Bevo: Ruth Foster, Lady Alcohol: Delyle Alda
  - Song: "A Syncopated Cocktail" words and music by Irving Berlin, sung by Marilynn Miller
  - Cast: China Dolls: Misses Vaughn, Clarens, Lindsey, Shea, Ray, Wood, Baron, Raylor, Lorraine, Lyon, Chittenden, Bryant and Haver, Total Abstainers: Misses Crane, Larned, Foster, Jesmer, Squire, E. Callahan, Kendall, Martin, Lamar, Lamorte, Thomas, Page, Davis, Leisy, Barness and North
- Episode 8: Songs sung by Van and Schenck
  - Cast: Gus Van, Joe Schenck
- Episode 9: "My Tambourine Girl" words and music by Irving Berlin, sung by John Steel
  - Cast: The Girl: Marie Wallace, Children: Fairbanks Twins, Salvation Lassies: Misses Crane, Lamorte, Foster, D. Richardson, jesmer, Drange, Larned and Leisy, Officers' Chorus: Tracy Buddington, Armand King, Jack Waverly, Kenneth Lawrence, Bernard Carples, Ray Klages and Addison Young
- Episode 10: Finale: "The Salvation Army Girls" Scene: Victory Arch
  - Song: "We Made the Doughnuts Over There" words and music by Irving Berlin.

== Reception ==
New York Tribune critic Heywood Broun remarked: "Among the most beautiful of the series. … present cast has an excellent voice. … The singing of John Steel was among the best features of the performance at the New Amsterdam Theatre last night. Particularly in the Irving Berlin number "A Pretty Girl is Like a Melody" his voice showed to excellent advantage. ... The comedy honors of the evening went very easily to Eddie Cantor. The knockabout sketch "At the Osteopath's" is among the most amusing bits of violence we have ever seen on the stage. ... Marilyn Miller dances entrancingly and sings very little. She was gorgeous in a minstrel number. ... The appeal to the eye is almost constant and Joseph Urban has never done better. The two tableaux arranged by Ben Ali Haggin are both eminently successful. ... The first night performance suffered from the usual Follies fault of being too long, and the evening was not free of dull spots which might be cut. A long dance number by Maurice and Walton seemed to us a bore. We were somewhat disappointed in Ray and Johnny Dooley. They were funny at times, but though they fall as hard and as often as their relatives at the Winter Garden and the Century Roof, something of the Newtonian inspiration, which possesses William and Gordon, is lacking. Bert Williams was exceedingly funny in a Rennold Wolf sketch, in which he plays the part of the assistant to a sharpshooter, but none of his songs in the first two-thirds of the performance was in the least effective. ... Ziegfeld should receive his annual tribute from those who write for the theatre because in his own field he does his work supremely well. He has been a considerable figure in bringing beauty and taste to American musical shows."

The unnamed critic in the Boston Daily Globe wrote: "[T]he 1919 version of this 'Institution' proving to be superior to any of the previous dozen produced by the master manager. ... [T]he girls are so pretty and elegantly costumed, the scenes are so beautiful and everything goes with such snap and verve that no one cares to have the style of revue changed. ... The Follies of 1919 is the usual gorgeous, glittering Ziegfeld show, staged lavishly and on an artistic manner and of a higher standard than ever. ... Speed and no lagging moments marked the progress of the show. ... Those agile dancing knock-abouts, Johnny and Ray Dooley, indulged in their hazardous work with as much gusto as though limbs were impervious to breakage. ... The Urban views and pictures by Ben Ali Haggin are strikingly effective, curtains, color schemes and stage accessories, though at times bizarre, appealing strongly to one's sense of harmony. Notably luxurious are 'The Spanish Frolic', the minstrel show, 'Harem Life', 'The Circus Ballet', 'A Syncopated Cocktail' and the finale."

== Labor unrest and a royal visit ==
During the labor unrest in the summer of 1919, the actors planned to strike. Ziegfeld received an injunction against Actors' Equity, thinking he could avoid a strike. But after the audience was seated on August 13, 1919, Eddie Cantor, Johnny Dooley, Van and Schenck and Phil Dwyer did not show up. Fifteen minutes after the scheduled curtain, the performance was called off. The audience greeted the announcement with "a mixture of jeers, cheers, and laughter." The box office refunded patron's tickets, costing $2,740. The five actors were sued for $500,000 damages. The San Francisco Chronicle reported that stagehands and musicians also went on strike in sympathy with Actors' Equity. Performances resumed on September 10.

The Prince of Wales attended on November 20, 1919. The New York Tribune reported that he laughed appreciatively when Eddie Cantor stepped forward in the direction of his box and said "It'll be too bad if the Prince of Wales goes home without getting one look at The Bronx."

== On tour ==
The 1919 Follies played in Washington D.C. beginning April 25, 1920, then played in Boston beginning May 17, 1920.
