= Robert Sherman =

Robert Sherman may refer to:

- Robert A. Sherman (born 1953), Massachusetts attorney and U.S. ambassador to Portugal from 2014 to 2017
- Robert B. Sherman (1925–2012), American songwriter and screenwriter
- Robert J. Sherman (born 1968), American-born songwriter, son of Robert B. Sherman
- Robert Sherman (music critic) (1932–2023), American music critic, radio personality, academic, and writer on music
- Robert Sherman (journalist) (born 1996), American war correspondent for NewsNation
- Rob Sherman (1953–2016), American atheist activist, perennial candidate, and businessman
- Bob Sherman (actor) (1940–2004), actor noted for work in such shows as The Sandbaggers
- Bob Sherman (American football) (born 1942), American football player
- Bobby Sherman (1943–2025), American singer and actor
- Bob Sherman (American football) (born 1942), former Pittsburgh Steelers and Iowa Hawkeyes player
- Bob Sherman (radio executive), WNBC radio executive
- Robert Sherman (writer) (1926–1997), film producer, screenwriter, and actor, credited for Too Late the Hero and Dallas
- Robert S. Sherman, inventor from Lynn, Massachusetts who invented the portable in-window air conditioner
