= Matilda (calypso song) =

Calypso song

"Matilda" (sometimes spelled Mathilda) is a calypso song. Some songwriting credits are given as Harry Thomas (rumoured to be a pseudonym combining Harry Belafonte and his guitarist, Millard Thomas, but ASCAP simply lists Harry Thomas alias Harry Belafonte, the writer of "Hold 'Em Joe"); some credits are given as Norman Span.

== History ==
"Matilda" is a song lamenting a woman who took a man for all he was worth. The song dates back to at least the 1930s, when calypso pioneer King Radio (the stage name of Norman Span) recorded the song. Harry Belafonte's first recording of it in 1953 became a big hit.

Belafonte originally recorded "Matilda" on April 27, 1953, and it was released as a single. He re-recorded the song for his second RCA Victor LP, Belafonte, released in 1955. The oft-repeated phrase in his rendition of "Matilda" emphasizes the syllables of the subject's name, as shown:

Hey! Ma-til-da; Ma-til-da; Ma-til-da, she take me money and run a-Venezuela.

Belafonte often performed the song in concert, and he would encourage the audience to sing that line. An example is heard on his 1959 live album Belafonte at Carnegie Hall, where the total playing time for "Matilda" is nearly 12 minutes.

== Allan Sherman recording ==
Allan Sherman recorded a variation of the song in his first album, 1962's My Son, the Folk Singer, and put a Jewish-sounding spin on it, including asking portions of his audience (such as "Members of Hadassah") to sing along:

Oy! My Zel-da; My Zel-da; My Zel-da, she took the money and ran with the tailor.

Sherman was later sued by the estate of the song's composer for not obtaining permission to perform it, because "Matilda" was protected by copyright law. Sherman paid a substantial penalty for this, as recounted in his book, A Gift of Laughter.

== Other recordings ==
- Jimmy Soul recorded a version in 1962 as "Twistin' Matilda (And the Channel)", which changed the lyrics of the verses as well as the chorus to: "She took the money and ran off to Las Vegas." The song hit number 22 on the Billboard Hot 100 charts.
- The Grateful Dead performed a cover of this song six times from 1994 to 1995.
- In Germany, the song was made popular by singer Udo Jürgens, who recorded it in 1968.
