= The Twelve Gifts of Christmas =

Single by Allan Sherman

from the album For Swingin' Livers Only!
- B-side: "(You Came a Long Way from St. Louis) You Went the Wrong Way, Old King Louie"
- Released: 1963
- Genre: Novelty Song, Christmas Music
- Length: 2:56
- Label: Warner Bros. Records 5406
- Songwriter: Allan Sherman
- Producer: Jimmy Hilliard

Allan Sherman singles chronology
"The Twelve Gifts of Christmas" (1963)	"Hello Muddah, Hello Fadduh (A Letter from Camp)" (1963)

"The Twelve Gifts of Christmas" is a song parody written and performed by Allan Sherman based on the classic Christmas song "The Twelve Days of Christmas". The song reached #5 on the Billboard Christmas Chart in 1963. A noted jukebox record supplier stated that if the record was released earlier, it "might have been a hot number." The song subsequently appeared on Sherman's 1964 album, For Swingin' Livers Only! The song was arranged by Lou Busch.

== Lyrics ==
The lyrics of the song consist of a series of gifts that Sherman lists off. Unlike in the original, each gift is only mentioned once after the fifth verse up through the final verse. In some verses, Sherman adds more details about the first gift.

- First day: A Japanese transistor radio.
- Second day: Green polka-dot pajamas (The radio is a "Nakashuma", presumably the manufacturer.)
- Third day: A calendar book with the name of his insurance man. (The radio is "the Mark 4 model, that's the one that's discontinued".)
- Fourth day: A simulated alligator wallet. (The radio comes with a leatherette case with holes in it, so one could listen right through the case.)
- Fifth day: A statue of a lady with a clock where her stomach ought to be. (The radio has a wire with a thing on one end, which one can stick into their ear, and a thing on the other end which one cannot stick anywhere, because it's bent.) (NOTE: The original version stated the word "naked" before "lady", however, because of the risqué subject, Sherman was advised to drop the word "naked" for airplay and public release purposes.)
- Sixth day: A hammered aluminum nutcracker. ("And all that other stuff.")
- Seventh day: A pink satin pillow that says "San Diego", with fringe all around it, and all that other stuff. (Which is the last mention of earlier gifts until the last verse.)
- Eighth day: An indoor plastic birdbath. (In some versions, this is the last mention of other gifts in the form of "All that other stuff")
- Ninth day: A pair of teakwood shower clogs.
- Tenth day: A chromium combination manicure, scissors, and cigarette lighter.
- Eleventh day: An automatic vegetable slicer that works when you see it on television, but not when you get it home.

For the final verse, Sherman does not add any more gifts. Instead, he declares that on the twelfth day, "I'm going to exchange," all the gifts, which he then lists off. Sherman ends the song by saying "Merry Christmas everybody."
