= Country Gardens =

English folk tune

"Country Gardens" is an old English folk tune traditionally used for Morris dancing. It was introduced by traditional folk musician William Kimber to Cecil Sharp near the beginning of the twentieth century, then popularised by a diverse range of musicians from Percy Grainger to Jimmie Rodgers.

== History as a folk tune ==
"Country Gardens" can be dated as far back as 1728, when a version using a very similar tune to the now-popular version appeared in Thomas Walker's Quaker's Opera, written as a parody of The Beggar's Opera by John Gay.

In 1906, the tune was collected by Cecil Sharp, who transcribed it from the playing of William Kimber. That transcription can be viewed online via the Vaughan Williams Memorial Library. In 1948, Kimber was recorded in London playing the tune on a concertina, in the same way he had performed it for Morris Dancers in the nineteenth century. His version was one of several variants collected from villages in the Cotswolds and used for Morris dances: "Bampton in the Bush" (collected by Roy Dommett from Arnold Woodley); "Field Town" (Leafield collected by Kenworthy Schofield); "Headington" (collected by Carey) and "Longborough" (collected by Cecil Sharp and Schofield).

== Percy Grainger ==
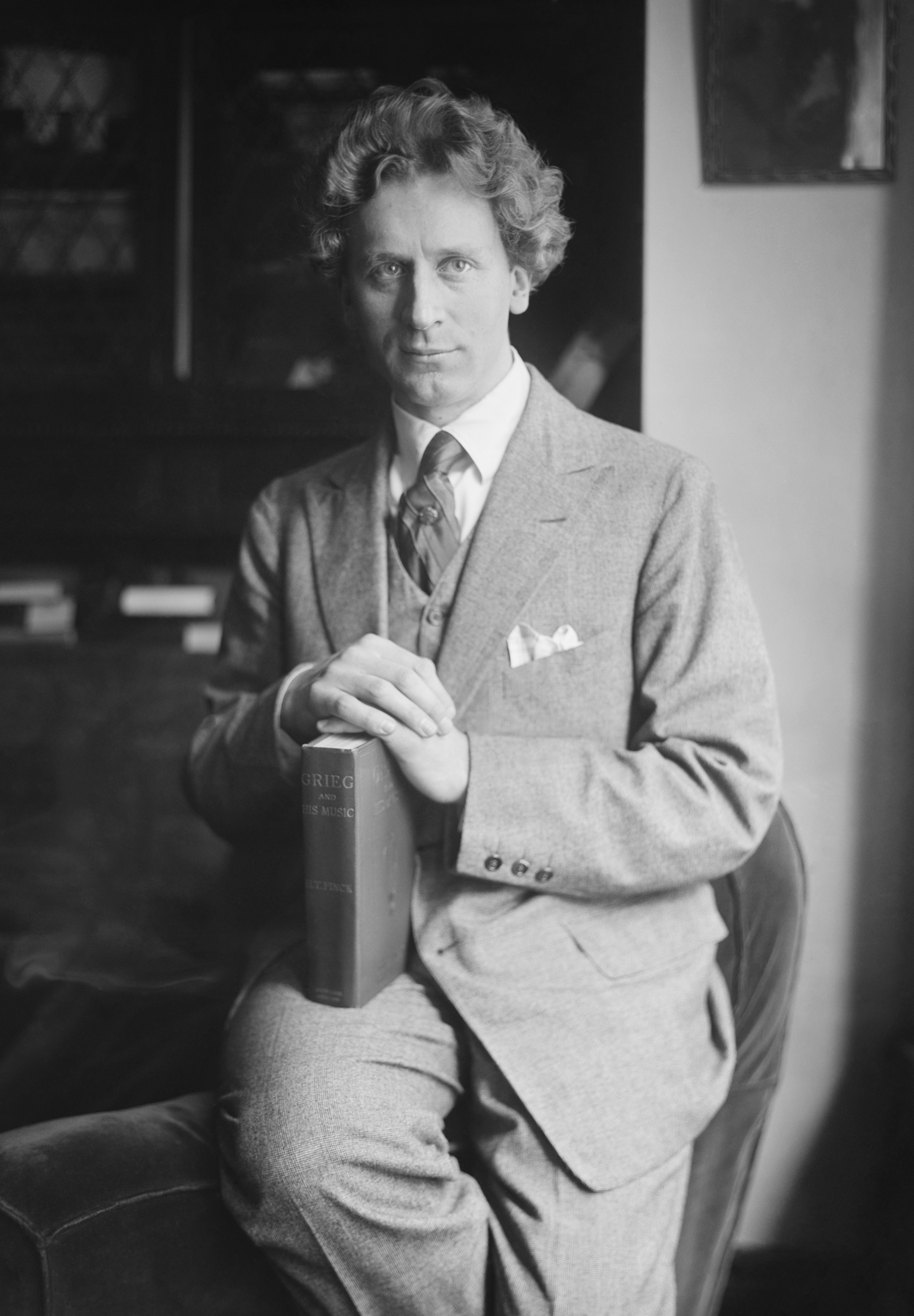
Percy Grainger, c. 1910s

Grainger, "Country Gardens", for solo piano

The Australian composer and folklorist Percy Grainger helped popularise the tune when he arranged it for piano in 1918. Grainger seemed to have become bored with the tune when he re-orchestrated the piece later in life with intentional "wrong" notes, and remarked: "The typical English country garden is not often used to grow flowers in; it is more likely to be a vegetable plot. So you can think of turnips as I play it." Grainger's playfulness with harmony, and rhythm seeming to stumble, was part of his modernism. A seemingly wrong note and a skipped or rushed beat prevented the music from being four-square and also sounded like amateurs performing and then being transcribed with their stumbles. His commentary was often deliberately provocative.

Despite its simplistic nature, it is arguably Grainger's most well-known work; because of this, "Country Gardens" was added to the Australian National Film and Sound Archive's Sounds of Australia registry in 2008. The tune and the Grainger arrangement for piano and orchestra are often played by school orchestras.

== Popular versions and parodies ==
The eighteenth century satirical song "The Vicar of Bray" is based on the "Country Gardens" tune.

Pop singer Jimmie F. Rodgers sang a version ("English Country Garden"), which reached Number 5 in the UK singles chart in June 1962.

Anglo-Australian comedian Rolf Harris recorded a parody of the Rodgers version in the 1970s.

Comedian Allan Sherman used this melody as the tune for his 1963 song, "Here's to the Crabgrass".

The American jazz musician Charlie Parker and his collaborators, frequently ended a number with a brief snatch of it.

The video game Weird Dreams uses the song while the player is in an area called "Country Garden".

Jeff Minter's computer game Hover Bovver repeats a version of "Country Gardens" as background music as the player absconds with their neighbour's lawn mower and proceeds to wreak havoc across different lawns.

Danish musician Kim Larsen wrote a Danish text to the tune called "Kongens have" ("The King's Garden", which is the most often used Danish name for Rosenborg Castle Gardens). This song is however more often associated with another Danish musician, Flemming Jørgensen, who also recorded a version of the song.

The Bluey episode "Pass the Parcel" features a fiddle version of the tune over the title and throughout the episode.
