= Hello Muddah, Hello Faddah! (book) =

Book by Allan Sherman

Hello Muddah, Hello Faddah! (A Letter from Camp)
- Author: Allan Sherman and Lou Busch
- Illustrator: Jack E. Davis
- Cover artist: Davis
- Language: English
- Subject: summer camp
- Genre: children's books picture books
- Publisher: Dutton Children's Books
- Publication date: 2004
- Publication place: United States of America
- Media type: Print
- ISBN: 0-525-46942-7
- OCLC: 54372796
- Dewey Decimal: 782.42164/0268 22
- LC Class: PZ8.3.S55268 He 2004

Hello Muddah, Hello Faddah! (A Letter from Camp) is a children's book based on the novelty song "Hello Muddah, Hello Fadduh (A Letter from Camp)" by Allan Sherman and Lou Busch, and illustrated by Jack E. Davis.

In the book, a wide-eyed, snaggled-tooth narrator seems befuddled by all the problems at Camp Granada.
