= Allan in Wonderland =

Allan In Wonderland

Studio album by Allan Sherman
- Released: 1964
- Genre: Comedy Music
- Length: 32:01
- Producer: Jimmy Hilliard

Allan Sherman chronology
| My Son, the Nut (1963) | Allan In Wonderland (1964) | Peter and the Commissar (1964) |

Professional ratings
Review scores
| Source | Rating |
|---|---|
| AllMusic | 3/5 stars |

Allan In Wonderland is an album by Allan Sherman, released by Warner Brothers Records.

== Track listing ==
=== Side One ===
1. "Skin" ("Heart" from Damn Yankees)
2. "Lotsa Luck" ("Badinage" by Victor Herbert)
3. "Green Stamps" ("Green Eyes")
4. "Holiday For States" ("Holiday for Strings")
5. "You Need An Analyst" ("I've Got a Little List" from The Mikado)
6. "The Drop-Outs March" ("The Notre Dame March")

=== Side Two ===
1. "I Can't Dance" (Grieg's Norwegian Dance Number 2.)
2. "Night And Day" (With Punctuation Marks)
3. "Little Butterball" ("Little Buttercup")
4. "Good Advice"
