= My Son, the Celebrity =

Studio album by Allan Sherman
- Released: January 1963
- Recorded: November 30, 1962
- Genre: Comedy Music
- Length: 35:03
- Label: Warner Bros.

Allan Sherman chronology
My Son, the Folk Singer (1962)	My Son, the Celebrity (1963)	My Son, the Nut (1963)

Professional ratings
Review scores
Source	Rating
Allmusic	4.5/5 stars
New Record Mirror	5/5 stars

My Son, the Celebrity is a musical comedy album by Allan Sherman, released in the United States by Warner Bros. in January 1963.

The album was the second of three straight albums by Sherman to reach #1 on the Billboard album charts. It reached #1 on Billboard's Top 150 Best Selling LPs (Monaural) chart for the week ending March 9, 1963. It was released less than three months after My Son, the Folk Singer, which reached #1 on the same chart in December 1962.

My Son, the Celebrity followed the same template as My Son, the Folk Singer, mixing comic parodies of popular songs with cultural references and Jewish humor. Lou Busch once again provided orchestration.

== Track listing ==
=== Side One ===
1. "Al 'n' Yetta" ("Alouette")
2. "Barry is the Baby's Name" / "Horowitz" / "Get on the Garden Freeway" ("Mary is a Grand Old Name", "Harrigan", "Give My Regards to Broadway")
3. "Mexican Hat Dance" ("Jarabe Tapatío")
4. "The Bronx Bird Watcher" ("Willow, tit-willow (On a tree by a river)")
5. "The Let's All Call Up A.T.&T. and Protest to the President March"
6. "Harvey and Sheila" ("Hava Nagila")

=== Side Two ===
1. "Won't You Come Home, Disraeli" ("Won't You Come Home Bill Bailey")
2. "No One's Perfect" ("Far Above Cayuga's Waters")
3. "When I Was a Lad" (from H.M.S. Pinafore)
4. "Me" ("Torna a Surriento")
5. "Shticks of One and a Half a Dozen of the Other" ("Molly Malone" / "Auld Lang Syne" / "Billy Boy" / "Marianne" / "On the Banks of the Wabash, Far Away" / "On Top of Old Smoky" / "Aura Lea" / "My Grandfather's Clock" / "Comin' Thro' the Rye" / "Polly Wolly Doodle" / "Down by the Riverside")

== Chart positions ==
Year	Chart	Position	Weeks	Dates
1963	Billboard's Top 150 Best Selling LPs (Monaural)	1	1	March 9, 1963
1963	Billboard's Top 50 Best Selling LPs (Stereo)	4	2	February 9–16, 1963

== Songs ==
As with My Son, The Folk Singer, almost all the songs on the album contain some Jewish reference, or at least a main character or characters with apparently Jewish names.

- "Al 'n' Yetta" - References to TV shows of the day
- Cohan medley:
  - "Barry is the Baby's Name"
  - "Horowitz"
  - "Get On The Garden Freeway"
- "The Bronx Bird Watcher" - A talking / singing bird with a Jewish accent.
- "Harvey and Sheila" - Filled with alphabetical references: IBM, PTA, GOP, USA, etc.
- "When I Was a Lad" - Recast as the story of a young man who succeeds at an advertising agency: So I thank old Yale / And I thank the Lord / And I also thank my father / Who is chairman of the board.
- "Shticks of One and Half a Dozen of the Other" is a stylistic followup to "Shticks and Stones", another medley of short parodies, some Jewish-oriented, some not. For example:
  - New words to "Molly Malone", describing her as "Cockeyed and muscle-bound".
  - On top of Old Smokey / All covered with hair / Of course I'm referring / To Smokey the Bear (On Top of Old Smoky)
  - When you go to the delicatessen store / Don't buy the liverwurst (Down by the Riverside)
