= Camp Granada =

American board game

- Camp Granada box with caricature of Allan Sherman
- Publishers: Milton Bradley
- Players: 2-4
- Playing time: 60 minutes
- Chance: Medium (shuffling, wild cards)
- Skills: Eye–hand coordination

Camp Granada is a 1965 children's board game by the Milton Bradley Company based on Allan Sherman's 1963 novelty song "Hello Muddah, Hello Fadduh (A Letter from Camp)." Campers take turns driving a breakdown-prone bus to gather animals from various summer camp locations to be the first to leave for home. The game board depicts spikes on the diving board, an octopus in the swimming hole, and a lover's leap into a volcano.

== Gameplay ==
Camp Granada Bus cards have an image of a blue bus in disrepair and, on the reverse, a humorous reason to either drive the bus to a camp location and pick up an "icky animal" or to receive a "special privilege" and "take one icky animal from any player". After drawing a Camp Granada Bus card, the player then moves the toy bus along the road to the camp location specified by the card.

The challenge is that the front axle of the bus can slide side-to-side and "the motor falls out right in the middle". In particular, if the front wheels move too far from the side of the bus, a small cam on the middle of the axle will contact one of two miniature lever arms connected to the bus's radiator, which is hinged and will be deflected to fall forward — the "breakdown" that ends a player's turn. For success, a player must carefully watch that neither front wheel moves too far beyond the corresponding bus fender.

For special privilege cards, to take one icky animal, a rule requires reaching into a competitor's bunkhouse without looking, so a game skill is to remember which competitor had acquired particular animals, and then by touch, recognize the shape of needed creature.

The player who first acquires the required three ICKY animals and exits the camp is the winner.

== Equipment and setup ==
Equipment includes the 23 5/8 in × 19 1/2 in (600 mm × 500 mm) tri-fold game board, a plastic toy bus, 4 cardboard bunkhouses, 12 rubber ICKY animals (2 each Crawfish, Frog, Lizard, Mouse, Snake, Spider), 16 ICKY animal cards (2 for each of the 6 animals, plus 4 for the Boating, Bunkhouse, Handicrafts, and Hiking Awards), and 48 of the 2 5/8 in × 1 3/4 in (67 mm × 44 mm) Camp Granada Bus Cards (6 Special Privilege, plus 3 for each of 12 of the locations and only 2 for First Aid Training, Bunk House, & Hospital)

Setup requires animals be placed at camp locations and the bunkhouses be assembled and placed at each corner of the game board for players to subsequently conceal icky animals. Icky animal cards are then divided among the players to identify which icky animals need to be gathered.
