= For Swingin' Livers Only! =

Studio album by Allan Sherman
- Released: 1964
- Genre: Comedy Music
- Length: 35:30
- Label: Warner Bros. Records
- Producer: Jimmy Hilliard

Allan Sherman chronology
Peter and the Commissar (1964)	For Swingin' Livers Only! (1964)	My Name is Allan (1965)

Professional ratings
Review scores
Source	Rating
Allmusic	3/5 stars
Record Mirror	4/5 stars

For Swingin' Livers Only! is the sixth studio album by Allan Sherman, released by Warner Brothers Records in 1964. The title is a play on the 1956 Frank Sinatra album Songs for Swingin' Lovers! and Jackie Gleason's 1954 mood music album Music for Lovers Only.

== Track listing ==
=== Side one ===
1. "Grow, Mrs. Goldfarb" ("The Glow-Worm")
2. "Your Mother's Here to Stay" ("Our Love Is Here to Stay")
3. "Pills" ("Smiles")
4. "Shine On, Harvey Bloom" ("Shine On, Harvest Moon")
5. "J.C. Cohen" ("Casey Jones") (For John Charles Cohen)

=== Side two ===
1. "Pop Hates The Beatles" ("Pop Goes the Weasel")
2. "Beautiful Teamsters" ("Beautiful Dreamer")
3. "Kiss of Myer" and "Whatever Meyer Wants"("Kiss of Fire" and "Whatever Lola Wants")
4. "America's a Nice Italian Name" ("Funiculì, Funiculà")
5. "The Twelve Gifts of Christmas" ("The Twelve Days of Christmas")
6. "Bye Bye Blumberg" ("Bye Bye Blackbird")
