= List of Iowa Hawkeyes in the NFL draft =

College football players selected in NFL draft

This is a list of Iowa Hawkeyes football players in the NFL draft.

== Key ==
= Pro Bowler
= Hall of Famer

B	Back	K	Kicker	NT	Nose tackle
C	Center	LB	Linebacker	FB	Fullback
DB	Defensive back	P	Punter	HB	Halfback
DE	Defensive end	QB	Quarterback	WR	Wide receiver
DT	Defensive tackle	RB	Running back	G	Guard
E	End	T	Offensive tackle	TE	Tight end

== Selections ==
Year	Round	Pick	Overall	Player	Team	Position
1936	1	4	4	Dick Crayne	Brooklyn Dodgers	B
1938	7	2	52	Bob Lannon	Philadelphia Eagles	E
1939	18	9	169	Frank Balasz	Green Bay Packers	B
1940	2	4	14	Nile Kinnick	Brooklyn Dodgers	B
1940	11	6	96	Erwin Prasse	Detroit Lions	E
1940	22	4	199	Henry Luebcke	Green Bay Packers	T
1941	12	6	106	Mike Enich	Green Bay Packers	T
1942	5	9	39	Bill Green	Green Bay Packers	B
1942	10	5	85	Bill Diehl	Detroit Lions	C
1942	22	1	196	Al Couppee	Washington Redskins	B
1943	2	5	15	Tom Farmer	Cleveland Rams	B
1943	8	5	65	Bill Parker	Cleveland Rams	E
1943	16	3	143	Bill Burkett	Brooklyn Dodgers	E
1945	3	8	24	Stan Mohrbacher	Detroit Lions	G
1945	5	8	40	Forest Masterson	Chicago Bears	C
1945	14	5	136	Chuck Uknes	Cleveland Rams	B
1945	14	7	138	Ben Trickey	Detroit Lions	B
1945	17	5	169	Dick Hoerner	Cleveland Rams	B
1945	18	7	182	Jim Keane	Chicago Bears	E
1945	19	6	192	Bruno Niedziela	Chicago Bears	T
1945	21	1	209	Ted Curran	Brooklyn Dodgers	B
1945	21	10	218	Sam Vacanti	New York Giants	B
1946	13	6	116	Tom Hand	Green Bay Packers	C
1947	13	2	107	Bob Sullivan	Boston Yanks	B
1947	23	9	214	Hal Shoener	New York Giants	E
1947	24	4	219	Jim Smith	Washington Redskins	B
1947	31	1	286	Herb Shoener	Washington Redskins	E
1948	17	1	146	Joe Grothus	New York Giants	G
1948	21	1	186	Dick Woodard	New York Giants	C
1948	27	4	249	Jim Shoaf	Boston Yanks	T
1949	4	4	35	Bill Kay	New York Giants	T
1949	11	6	107	Jim Cozad	Los Angeles Rams	T
1949	18	9	180	Webb Halbert	Chicago Cardinals	B
1949	25	9	250	Ralph Doran	New York Giants	B
1950	9	5	110	Don Winslow	Washington Redskins	T
1951	25	5	296	Glenn Drahn	Philadelphia Eagles	B
1951	30	2	353	Jerry Faske	San Francisco 49ers	B
1952	7	3	76	Bill Reichardt	Green Bay Packers	B
1952	8	6	91	Hubert Johnson	Washington Redskins	T
1954	4	11	48	Jerry Hilgenberg	Cleveland Browns	C
1954	12	3	136	Don Chelf	Baltimore Colts	T
1954	14	11	168	Jim Head	Cleveland Browns	B
1954	16	4	185	George Rice	New York Giants	B
1955	3	10	35	John Hall	Cleveland Browns	T
1955	16	12	193	Don Suchy	Cleveland Browns	C
1955	20	5	234	Lou Matykiewicz	Pittsburgh Steelers	E
1955	29	10	347	Dick Klein	Chicago Bears	T
1956
1956	4	1	38	Jerry Reichow	Detroit Lions	QB
1956	5	2	51	Jim Freeman	Los Angeles Rams	E
1956	6	11	72	Eddie Vincent	Los Angeles Rams	B
1956	9	1	98	Cal Jones	Detroit Lions	G
1956	12	3	136	Roger Swedberg	San Francisco 49ers	T
1957	7	3	76	Frank Gilliam	Green Bay Packers	E
1957	10	8	117	Don Dobrino	Washington Redskins	B
1957	16	1	182	John Nocera	Philadelphia Eagles	B
1957	19	5	222	Kenny Ploen	Cleveland Browns	QB
1958
1958	1	10	10	Alex Karras	Detroit Lions	DT
1958	4	6	43	Frank Rigney	Philadelphia Eagles	T
1958	5	12	61	Jim Gibbons	Cleveland Browns	E
1958	14	3	160	Bill Lapham	Philadelphia Eagles	C
1958	17	3	196	Bill Van Buren	Philadelphia Eagles	C
1958	18	3	208	John A. Burroughs Jr.	Philadelphia Eagles	T
1958	26	5	306	Frank Bloomquist	Washington Redskins	G
1959	1	1	1	Randy Duncan	Green Bay Packers	QB
1959	6	4	64	Mac Lewis	Chicago Cardinals	T
1959	7	7	79	Mitch Ogiego	Washington Redskins	QB
1959	28	12	336	Fred Long	Baltimore Colts	B
1960
1960	2	5	17	Bob Jeter	Green Bay Packers	B
1960	3	7	31	Curt Merz	Philadelphia Eagles	E
1960	5	8	56	Don Norton	Philadelphia Eagles	E
1960	18	6	210	Charley Lee	Pittsburgh Steelers	T
1960	19	9	225	Bob Hain	Philadelphia Eagles	T
1961	14	14	196	Willie Fleming	Philadelphia Eagles	RB
1961	19	6	258	Bernard Wyatt	Pittsburgh Steelers	B
1962	4	10	52	Larry Ferguson	Detroit Lions	B
1962	7	3	87	Sherwyn Thorson	Los Angeles Rams	G
1962	9	6	118	Wilburn Hollis	St. Louis Cardinals	QB
1962	13	1	169	Bill Whisler	Washington Redskins	E
1963	10	14	140	Earl McQuiston	Green Bay Packers	G
1963	12	6	160	Bill Perkins	Dallas Cowboys	RB
1963	14	12	194	Joe Williams	New York Giants	B
1963	15	11	207	Matt Szykowny	Pittsburgh Steelers	B
1964
1964	2	4	18	Paul Krause	Washington Redskins	DB
1964	4	5	47	Mike Reilly	Chicago Bears	LB
1964	4	6	48	Wally Hilgenberg	Detroit Lions	G
1964	12	9	163	Bob Sherman	Pittsburgh Steelers	B
1964	13	14	182	Cloyd Webb	Chicago Bears	E
1964	17	14	238	Constantinos Kasapis	Chicago Bears	T
1965	20	12	278	Tony Giacobazzi	St. Louis Cardinals	E
1966
1966	1	5	5	John Niland	Dallas Cowboys	G
1966	3	5	37	Al Randolph	San Francisco 49ers	RB
1966	3	11	43	Dave Long	St. Louis Cardinals	DE
1966	4	10	58	Gary Snook	St. Louis Cardinals	QB
1966	5	11	75	Bill Briggs	New York Giants	DE
1966	11	10	165	Cliff Wilder	New York Giants	WR
1967	7	2	161	Bob Ziolkowski	Green Bay Packers	T
1967	13	10	325	Rich Gibbs	San Francisco 49ers	DB
1969	2	22	48	Ed Podolak	Kansas City Chiefs	RB
1969	14	22	360	Al Bream	Kansas City Chiefs	DB
1970	4	25	103	Paul Laaveg	Washington Redskins	T
1970	6	21	151	Mike Cilek	Cleveland Browns	QB
1970	13	12	324	Rich Stepanek	Atlanta Falcons	DT
1970	16	7	397	Larry Ely	Cincinnati Bengals	LB
1971	6	16	146	Kerry Reardon	Kansas City Chiefs	DB
1971	9	24	232	Tim Sullivan	Minnesota Vikings	RB
1971	10	1	235	Layne McDowell	Boston Patriots	T
1972	1	12	12	Craig Clemons	Chicago Bears	DB
1972	6	26	156	Charles Bolden	Dallas Cowboys	DB
1972	9	11	219	Larry Horton	Chicago Bears	DE
1973	7	21	177	John Muller	Green Bay Packers	T
1973	8	9	191	Bill Windauer	Baltimore Colts	G
1973	8	14	196	Craig Darling	Minnesota Vikings	T
1973	15	24	388	Charles Cross	Pittsburgh Steelers	DB
1974	7	14	170	Dan Dickel	Baltimore Colts	LB
1975	7	22	178	Earl Couthill	Chicago Bears	DB
1976	1	14	14	Rod Walters	Kansas City Chiefs	G
1976	2	12	40	Jim Jensen	Dallas Cowboys	RB
1976	2	24	52	Joe Devlin	Buffalo Bills	T
1976	7	14	196	Rod Wellington	Kansas City Chiefs	RB
1976	9	3	240	Warren Peiffer	New Orleans Saints	DT
1978	9	11	233	Dean Moore	San Francisco 49ers	LB
1978	10	28	278	Barry Tomasetti	Dallas Cowboys	T
1979	9	7	227	Tom Rusk	New York Giants	LB
1979	12	9	312	Dave Becker	Chicago Bears	DB
1980	9	11	232	Dennis Mosley	Minnesota Vikings	RB
1980	9	17	238	Jim Swift	Seattle Seahawks	T
1981	2	8	36	John Harty	San Francisco 49ers	DT
1981	11	4	280	Matt Petrzelka	San Diego Chargers	T
1981	11	25	301	Keith Cahppelle	Atlanta Falcons	WR
1982	1	22	22	Ron Hallstrom	Green Bay Packers	G
1982	2	14	41	Andre Tippett	New England Patriots	LB
1983	5	17	129	Brett Miller	Atlanta Falcons	T
1983	6	27	167	Reggie Roby	Miami Dolphins	P
1983	8	23	219	Mark Bortz	Chicago Bears	G
1984
1984	1	21	21	John Alt	Kansas City Chiefs	T
1984	4	13	97	Joel Hilgenberg	New Orleans Saints	C
1984	5	25	137	Norm Granger	Dallas Cowboys	RB
1984	6	26	166	Joe Levelis	Dallas Cowboys	G
1984	10	23	275	Dave Moritz	San Francisco 49ers	WR
1985	2	13	41	Jonathan Hayes	Kansas City Chiefs	TE
1985	2	25	53	Owen Gill	Seattle Seahawks	RB
1985	3	9	65	George Little	Miami Dolphins	DT
1985	8	15	211	Dave Strobel	Cincinnati Bengals	LB
1986	1	12	12	Chuck Long	Detroit Lions	QB
1986	1	16	16	Ronnie Harmon	Buffalo Bills	RB
1986	1	22	22	Mike Haight	New York Jets	T
1986	4	10	92	Devon Mitchell	Detroit Lions	DB
1986	11	10	287	Larry Station	Pittsburgh Steelers	LB
1987	3	2	58	Chris Gambol	Indianapolis Colts	T
1987	3	5	61	Dave Croston	Green Bay Packers	T
1987	4	4	88	Mark Vlasic	San Diego Chargers	QB
1987	8	3	198	Jeff Drost	Green Bay Packers	DT
1988	3	5	60	Quinn Early	San Diego Chargers	WR
1988	4	19	101	Kevin Harmon	Seattle Seahawks	RB
1988	5	5	114	Herb Wester	Cincinnati Bengals	T
1988	10	12	261	Joe Schuster	Philadelphia Eagles	DT
1989
1989	3	7	63	Marv Cook	New England Patriots	TE
1989	3	8	64	Bob Kratch	New York Giants	G
1989	3	14	70	Joe Mott	New York Jets	LB
1989	12	18	325	Chuck Hartlieb	Houston Oilers	QB
1990	7	11	176	Bill Anderson	Chicago Bears	C
1990	10	3	251	Brad Quast	New York Jets	LB
1991	2	16	43	Nick Bell	Los Angeles Raiders	RB
1991	5	11	122	Merton Hanks	San Francisco 49ers	DB
1991	10	25	275	Michael Titley	Miami Dolphins	TE
1991	11	19	297	Tony Stewart	Seattle Seahawks	RB
1992	7	2	170	Ron Geater	Denver Broncos	DE
1992	7	4	172	Lance Olberding	Cincinnati Bengals	T
1992	10	10	262	Mike Saunders	Pittsburgh Steelers	RB
1992	11	6	286	Rob Baxley	Phoenix Cardinals	T
1992	12	27	335	Matt Rodgers	Buffalo Bills	QB
1993	5	24	136	Mike Devlin	Buffalo Bills	C
1993	6	10	150	Scott Davis	New York Giants	G
1993	7	18	186	Danan Hughes	Kansas City Chiefs	WR
1994	4	22	125	Mike Wells	Minnesota Vikings	DT
1995	6	11	182	Fritz Fequeire	Denver Broncos	G
1996	3	21	82	Scott Slutzker	Indianapolis Colts	TE
1997	1	9	9	Tom Knight	Arizona Cardinals	DB
1997	1	30	30	Ross Verba	Green Bay Packers	G
1997	3	1	61	Sedrick Shaw	New England Patriots	RB
1997	4	23	119	Damien Robinson	Philadelphia Eagles	DB
1998	3	17	78	Mike Goff	Cincinnati Bengals	G
1998	4	9	101	Tavian Banks	Jacksonville Jaguars	RB
1998	4	22	114	Tim Dwight	Atlanta Falcons	WR
1998	5	21	144	Kerry Cooks	Minnesota Vikings	DB
1999	3	9	70	Jared DeVries	Detroit Lions	DT
1999	6	31	200	Eric Thigpen	Atlanta Falcons	DB
2000	5	29	158	Austin Wheatley	New Orleans Saints	TE
2000	6	32	198	Matt Bowen	St. Louis Rams	DB
2001	6	27	190	Kevin Kasper	Denver Broncos	WR
2002	2	24	56	Ladell Betts	Washington Redskins	RB
2002	5	21	156	Aaron Kampman	Green Bay Packers	DE
2002	6	12	184	Kahlil Hill	Atlanta Falcons	WR
2003
2003	1	24	24	Dallas Clark	Indianapolis Colts	TE
2003	2	1	33	Eric Steinbach	Cincinnati Bengals	G
2003	2	18	50	Bruce Nelson	Carolina Panthers	C
2003	5	5	140	Derek Pagel	New York Jets	DB
2003	5	16	151	Ben Sobieski	Buffalo Bills	G
2004	1	2	2	Robert Gallery	Oakland Raiders	T
2004	2	12	44	Bob Sanders	Indianapolis Colts	DB
2004	3	2	65	Nate Kaeding	San Diego Chargers	K
2004	7	29	230	Jared Clauss	Tennessee Titans	DT
2004	7	36	237	Erik Jensen	St. Louis Rams	TE
2005	2	14	46	Matt Roth	Miami Dolphins	DE
2005	2	27	59	Jonathan Babineaux	Atlanta Falcons	DT
2005	4	1	102	Sean Considine	Philadelphia Eagles	DB
2005	6	22	196	Tony Jackson	Seattle Seahawks	TE
2005	6	40	214	Pete McMahon	Oakland Raiders	T
2006
2006	1	17	17	Chad Greenway	Minnesota Vikings	LB
2006	3	3	67	Abdul Hodge	Green Bay Packers	LB
2007
2007	3	23	86	Marshal Yanda	Baltimore Ravens	G
2007	4	30	129	Scott Chandler	San Diego Chargers	TE
2007	7	37	247	Mike Elgin	New England Patriots	G
2008	3	4	67	Charles Godfrey	Carolina Panthers	DB
2008	4	17	116	Kenny Iwebema	Arizona Cardinals	DE
2008	6	22	188	Mike Humpal	Pittsburgh Steelers	LB
2009	3	1	65	Shonn Greene	New York Jets	RB
2009	3	2	66	Bradley Fletcher	St. Louis Rams	DB
2009	4	32	132	Seth Olsen	Denver Broncos	G
2009	6	29	202	Brandon Myers	Oakland Raiders	TE
2010	1	23	23	Bryan Bulaga	Green Bay Packers	T
2010	2	31	63	Pat Angerer	Indianapolis Colts	LB
2010	3	2	66	Amari Spievey	Detroit Lions	DB
2010	3	29	93	Tony Moeaki	Kansas City Chiefs	TE
2010	4	21	119	A. J. Edds	Miami Dolphins	LB
2010	7	9	216	Kyle Calloway	Buffalo Bills	T
2011	1	20	20	Adrian Clayborn	Tampa Bay Buccaneers	DE
2011	4	9	106	Christian Ballard	Minnesota Vikings	DT
2011	5	4	135	Ricky Stanzi	Kansas City Chiefs	QB
2011	5	11	142	Karl Klug	Tennessee Titans	DT
2011	5	30	161	Julian Vandervelde	Philadelphia Eagles	G
2011	6	33	198	Tyler Sash	New York Giants	DB
2012	1	23	23	Riley Reiff	Detroit Lions	T
2012	4	37	132	Mike Daniels	Green Bay Packers	DT
2012	5	6	141	Adam Gettis	Washington Redskins	G
2012	5	21	156	Shaun Prater	Cincinnati Bengals	DB
2012	6	24	194	Marvin McNutt	Philadelphia Eagles	WR
2012	7	10	217	Jordan Bernstine	Washington Redskins	DB
2013
2013	5	26	159	Micah Hyde	Green Bay Packers	DB
2014	3	1	65	C. J. Fiedorowicz	Houston Texans	TE
2014	3	7	71	Christian Kirksey	Cleveland Browns	LB
2014	4	19	119	Anthony Hitchens	Dallas Cowboys	LB
2015
2015	1	5	5	Brandon Scherff	Washington Redskins	T
2015	3	26	90	Carl Davis	Baltimore Ravens	DT
2015	4	20	119	Andrew Donnal	St. Louis Rams	T
2016	7	27	248	Austin Blythe	Indianapolis Colts	C
2017	3	40	104	C. J. Beathard	San Francisco 49ers	QB
2017	4	2	109	Jaleel Johnson	Minnesota Vikings	DT
2017	5	2	146	George Kittle	San Francisco 49ers	TE
2017	5	7	151	Desmond King	Los Angeles Chargers	DB
2018	2	7	39	James Daniels	Chicago Bears	C
2018	2	13	45	Josh Jackson	Green Bay Packers	CB
2018	4	6	106	Josey Jewell	Denver Broncos	LB
2019
2019	1	8	8	T. J. Hockenson	Detroit Lions	TE
2019	1	20	20	Noah Fant	Denver Broncos	TE
2019	4	5	107	Anthony Nelson	Tampa Bay Buccaneers	DE
2019	4	14	116	Amani Hooker	Tennessee Titans	DB
2020
2020	1	13	13	Tristan Wirfs	Tampa Bay Buccaneers	T
2020	2	22	54	A. J. Epenesa	Buffalo Bills	DE
2020	3	13	77	Michael Ojemudia	Denver Broncos	DB
2020	7	5	219	Geno Stone	Baltimore Ravens	DB
2020	7	30	244	Nate Stanley	Minnesota Vikings	QB
2021	3	20	84	Chauncey Golston	Dallas Cowboys	DE
2021	5	13	157	Ihmir Smith-Marsette	Minnesota Vikings	WR
2021	5	14	158	Daviyon Nixon	Carolina Panthers	DT
2021	6	1	185	Nick Niemann	Los Angeles Chargers	LB
2022
2022	1	25	25	Tyler Linderbaum	Baltimore Ravens	C
2022	4	9	114	Dane Belton	New York Giants	DB
2023	1	13	13	Lukas Van Ness	Green Bay Packers	DE
2023	1	18	18	Jack Campbell	Detroit Lions	LB
2023	2	3	34	Sam LaPorta	Detroit Lions	TE
2023	3	20	83	Riley Moss	Denver Broncos	DB
2024	2	8	40	Cooper DeJean	Philadelphia Eagles	DB
2024	4	15	115	Erick All	Cincinnati Bengals	TE
2024	4	22	122	Tory Taylor	Chicago Bears	P
2024	6	2	178	Logan Lee	Pittsburgh Steelers	DT
2025	3	19	83	Kaleb Johnson	Pittsburgh Steelers	RB
2025	5	28	164	Yahya Black	Pittsburgh Steelers	DT
2025	7	18	234	Mason Richman	Seattle Seahawks	T
2025	7	33	249	Connor Colby	San Francisco 49ers	G
2025	7	39	255	Luke Lachey	Houston Texans	TE
2026	2	25	57	Logan Jones	Chicago Bears	C
2026	3	32	96	Gennings Dunker	Pittsburgh Steelers	T
2026	4	21	121	Kaden Wetjen	Pittsburgh Steelers	WR
2026	5	8	148	Beau Stephens	Seattle Seahawks	G
2026	6	2	183	Karson Sharar	Arizona Cardinals	LB
2026	7	3	219	TJ Hall	New Orleans Saints	CB
2026	7	22	238	Max Llewellyn	Miami Dolphins	DE

== Notable undrafted players ==
Note: No drafts held before 1920

Debut Year	Player	Debut Team	Position	Notes
1962	Karl Finch	Los Angeles Rams	WR	—
1965	Dave Recher	Philadelphia Eagles	C	—
1966	Karl Noonan^{*}	Miami Dolphins	WR	Pro Bowl (1968)
1970	Larry Lawrence	Oakland Raiders	QB	—
1971	Jim Miller	Atlanta Falcons	G	—
1971	Kenny Price	New England Patriots	LB	—
1981	Jay Hilgenberg^{*}	Chicago Bears	C	Pro Bowl (1985-1991); Super Bowl Champion (XX)
1984	Jon Roehlk	Detroit Lions	G	—
1985	Mike Stoops	Chicago Bears	DB	—
1987	Jay Norvell	Chicago Bears	LB	—
1988	Mark Sindlinger	Pittsburgh Steelers	C	—
1988	Dwight Sistrunk	Pittsburgh Steelers	FS	—
1992	John Derby	Detroit Lions	LB	—
1996	Derek Price	Detroit Lions	TE	—
1996	Casey Wiegmann	Indianapolis Colts	C	Pro Bowl (2008)
1997	Bill Ennis-Inge	Tennessee Oilers	DE	—
1997	Nick Gallery	New York Jets	P	—
1998	Damon Gibson	Cincinnati Bengals	WR	—
1998	Jeremy McKinney	St. Louis Rams	G	—
2000	Zeron Flemister	Washington Redskins	TE	—
2000	Scott Pospisil	New England Patriots	DE	—
2000	Thad Sheldon	New England Patriots	LS	—
2000	Bashir Yamini	Denver Broncos	WR	—
2001	Jason Baker	San Francisco 49ers	P	—
2001	LeVar Woods	Arizona Cardinals	LB	—
2003	Colin Cole	Green Bay Packers	DE	—
2009	Matt Kroul	New York Jets	DT	—
2011	Ryan Donahue	Detroit Lions	P	—
2011	Allen Reisner	Minnesota Vikings	TE	—
2011	Jeff Tarpinian	New England Patriots	LB	—
2014	Conor Boffeli	Minnesota Vikings	OG	—
2014	James Ferentz^{†}	Houston Texans	C	Super Bowl Champion (50), (LIII)
2014	Casey Kreiter^{*}	Dallas Cowboys	LS	Pro Bowl (2018)
2015	Ray Hamilton	Dallas Cowboys	TE	—
2015	Mike Meyer	Tennessee Titans	K	—
2015	Damond Powell	Arizona Cardinals	WR	—
2016	Marshall Koehn	Miami Dolphins	K	—
2016	Henry Krieger-Coble	Denver Broncos	TE	—
2016	Tevaun Smith	Indianapolis Colts	WR	—
2017	Cole Croston	New England Patriots	T	—
2017	LeShun Daniels	New England Patriots	RB	—
2017	Greg Mabin	Tampa Bay Buccaneers	CB	—
2018	Ike Boettger	Buffalo Bills	G	—
2018	Ben Niemann^{†}	Kansas City Chiefs	LB	Super Bowl Champion (LIV)
2019	Nick Easley	Buffalo Bills	WR	—
2019	Jake Gervase^{†}	Los Angeles Rams	LB	Super Bowl Champion (LVI)
2019	Parker Hesse	Tennessee Titans	TE	—
2019	Matt Nelson	Detroit Lions	T	—
2020	Dominique Dafney	Indianapolis Colts	WR	—
2020	Cedrick Lattimore	Seattle Seahawks	DT	—
2020	Kristian Welch	Baltimore Ravens	LB	—
2021	Coy Cronk	Green Bay Packers	OT	—
2021	Jack Heflin	Green Bay Packers	DE	—
2021	Alaric Jackson^{†}	Los Angeles Rams	T	Super Bowl Champion (LVI)
2021	Mekhi Sargent	Tennessee Titans	RB	—
2021	Barrington Wade	Baltimore Ravens	LB	—
2022	Tyler Goodson	Green Bay Packers	RB	—
2022	Caleb Shudak	Tennessee Titans	K	—
2022	Zach VanValkenburg	Las Vegas Raiders	LB	—
2023	Kaevon Merriweather	Tampa Bay Buccaneers	S	—
2024	Joe Evans	Baltimore Ravens	LB	—
2024	Noah Shannon	Las Vegas Raiders	DT	—
2025	Sebastian Castro	Pittsburgh Steelers	S	—
2025	Luke Elkin	Chicago Bears	LS	—
2025	Jermari Harris	Tennessee Titans	CB	—
2025	Jay Higgins	Baltimore Ravens	LB	—
2025	Nick Jackson	Tampa Bay Buccaneers	LB	—
2026	Aaron Graves	Baltimore Ravens	DE	—
2026	Mark Gronowski	Miami Dolphins	QB	—
2026	Ethan Hurkett	Kansas City Chiefs	DE	—
2026	Hayden Large	Chicago Bears	TE	—
