= Hello Muddah, Hello Fadduh (A Letter from Camp) =

1963 novelty song by Allan Sherman

"Hello Muddah, Hello Fadduh! (A Letter from Camp)"

Single by Allan Sherman

from the album My Son, the Nut
- B-side: "(Rag Mop) Rat Fink"
- Released: August 1963
- Genre: Novelty song
- Length: 2:47
- Label: Warner Bros. Records
- Songwriters: Amilcare Ponchielli, Allan Sherman, Lou Busch
- Producer: Jimmy Hilliard

Allan Sherman singles chronology
"The Twelve Gifts of Christmas" (1963)	"Hello Muddah, Hello Fadduh! (A Letter from Camp)" (1963)	"Hello Muddah, Hello Fadduh (A Letter from Camp) (1964 Version)" (1964)

"Hello Muddah, Hello Fadduh! (A Letter from Camp)" is a novelty song recorded by Allan Sherman released in 1963. The melody is taken from the ballet Dance of the Hours from the opera La Gioconda by Amilcare Ponchielli, while the lyrics were written by Sherman and Lou Busch.

The lyrics are in the form of a letter written by a boy to his parents expressing dissatisfaction with summer camp. Sherman wrote the song after getting letters of complaint from his son Robert Sherman who was attending Camp Champlain, in Westport, New York.

The song was a major success and earned a Grammy Award. In 2019, "Hello Muddah" was selected by the Library of Congress for preservation in the United States National Recording Registry for being "culturally, historically, or aesthetically significant". The song's mention of "Leonard Skinner", a boy at the camp who "got ptomaine poisoning last night after dinner", was an inspiration for the name of the band Lynyrd Skynyrd, although the band's name was also inspired by a physical education instructor of the same name.

== The song ==
The song is a parody that complains about the fictional "Camp Granada" and is set to the tune of Amilcare Ponchielli's Dance of the Hours, from the opera La Gioconda. The name derives from the first lines:

Hello Muddah, hello Fadduh.
Here I am at Camp Granada.
Camp is very entertaining.
And they say we'll have some fun if it stops raining.

The lyrics go on to describe unpleasant, dangerous, and tragic developments, such as fellow campers going missing or contracting deadly illnesses. He asks how his "precious little brother" is doing, and begs to be taken home, afraid of being left out in the forest and fearing getting eaten by a bear, promising to behave, and even to let his aunt hug and kiss him. At the end, he notes that the rain has stopped and fun activities such as swimming, sailing, and baseball have begun, and asks his parents to "kindly disregard this letter".

The following year, Allan Sherman released a sequel song set to the same melody, "Return to Camp Granada". In this version, the boy writes to his parents again, but this time, he wants to stay and his younger brother is attending the camp as well. He describes another set of disastrous events, including a compound fracture, unhabitable bunks, outdoor bathrooms, and Lenny Bruce being brought in to entertain the campers.

== Success ==
The song scored No. 2 on the Billboard Hot 100 list for three weeks beginning on August 24, 1963. It was kept from No. 1 by both "Fingertips" by "Little" Stevie Wonder and "My Boyfriend's Back" by The Angels. The song also reached #9 on the Pop-Standard Singles chart. It hit number 1 in Hong Kong, where there were no summer camps in existence, according to Allan Sherman in his book A Gift of Laughter (1965).

Sherman wrote a new "back at Camp Granada" version, "Hello Muddah, Hello Fadduh! 64", for a May 27, 1964, performance on The Tonight Show Starring Johnny Carson. Sherman began that version by giving a camp whistle, followed by his spelling Granada's name, and then sticks out his tongue. In that version, the narrator is back at camp, recovering from his compound fracture, where some things, like the food have improved, "because the little black things in it are not moving". However, no one "knows where his trunk is and his bunk is where the skunk is." The narrator wishes that the showers, that have thin doors, were moved indoors. The narrator takes swimming lessons from an overweight woman. ("A Whale in a Bikini"). Lenny Bruce was scheduled to entertain there at the camp. The narrator loves the camp, missing the poker games, and requesting Unguentine. The narrator is taking care of his once homesick younger brother, who does not know how to blow his nose, and who has a bedwetting problem. This version was released as a single in 1964. It reached #18 on Canada's CHUM Charts. Sherman wrote a third version for, and acted in, a 1965 TV commercial for a board game about Camp Granada, a "real rotten camp".

The song won a Grammy Award in 1964 for Best Comedy Performance at the 6th Annual Grammy Awards. It was played frequently on the Dr. Demento Show and is featured on the Rhino Records compilation album, Dr. Demento 20th Anniversary Collection. It was played over the end credits of the 1993 film Indian Summer and was briefly heard in The Simpsons season 7 episode "Marge Be Not Proud" in 1995 after Bart Simpson (Nancy Cartwright) switches the family's answering machine cassette tapes, to the confusion of Homer Simpson (Dan Castellaneta), who assumed it was Lisa Simpson (Yeardley Smith) phoning from a summer camp. It was featured in the final scene of The King of Queens episode "Tube Stakes" in 1999, during which main character Arthur Spooner (Jerry Stiller) performs his morning stretches. The song is sung by some of the characters on the TV series 7th Heaven near the end of the 1996 season 1 episode "No Funerals and a Wedding" where it is mentioned to be Annie Camden's (Catherine Hicks) late mother Jenny Jackson's (Alice Hirson) favorite song.

The song remains a favorite at summer camps; despite Sherman largely being forgotten on oldies radio, the song has passed down through oral tradition through parents and camp counselors, an example of a song maintaining popularity through means other than mass media.

== Charts ==
=== Weekly charts ===
Chart (1963)	Peak position
Canada (CHUM Hit Parade)	4
Hong Kong	1
New Zealand (Lever Hit Parade)	1
UK Singles (OCC)	14
US Billboard Hot 100	2
US Cash Box Top 100	1

=== Year-end charts ===
Chart (1963)	Rank
US Billboard Hot 100	82
US Cash Box Top 100	97

== Translations ==
Variations of the song include adaptations in Swedish ("Brev från kolonien" by Cornelis Vreeswijk), Finnish ("Terve mutsi, terve fatsi, tässä teidän ihmelapsi") and Norwegian ("Brev fra leier'n" by Birgit Strøm). The Finnish version is included in the Finnish Boy Scouts' songbook. The Swedish version notably does not revolve around the camper hating the camp but is about the kids being mischievous, running roughshod over it and having run off all the counselors, one of whom has drowned herself in the well after they let a snake into the mess hall, and the organizer of the camp being arrested by police after the kids start a forest fire. The song begins with the boy writing the letter asking his parents to send more money, because he has lost all his pocket money playing dice with the other campers. The song then ends with the boy having to wrap up the letter as he is about to join the others in burning down the neighboring camp lodge.

The Hebrew version was translated by playwright Hanoch Levin and performed by the IDF's Armored Corps band's lead singer Tiki Dayan. The girl camper, in this version, goes through similar situations to the English original, but the camp itself is hinted to be more like a prison (e.g. she is writing from "my cell"). The camper wishes she could be back in school with its abusive teachers and principal.

The Dutch version "Brief uit la Courtine" (also called Beste Ouders, Lieve Ine) sung by Rijk de Gooyer is not about a children's summer camp but about a soldier in the Dutch army camp at La Courtine, France. There is also "Brief naar La Courtine" (also called "Beste Kerel, Hier Is Vader") which is the response by the soldier's parents.

The Austrian comedian Paul Pizzera presented a German interpretation with the title "Jungscharlager" in 2013.

The American Jewish singer/comedian Country Yossi sings a Yiddish version called "Camp Zlateh" on his 1988 album Captured.

== See also ==
- Camp Runamuck, a sitcom (1965–66) loosely inspired by the song
- Camp Granada, a 1965 board game inspired by the song
- Hello Muddah, Hello Faddah! (book), a 2004 children's book based on the song
- Hello Muddah, Hello Fadduh! (musical), a 2002 musical revue inspired by the song
- Sandra Gould, who released a response novelty recording, set to the same music, entitled "Hello Melvin (This Is Mama)".
- Perrey and Kingsley did an instrumental version, called "Countdown at 6", on The In Sound from Way Out! Like "Hello Muddah, Hello Fadduh", it is based on Amilcare Ponchielli's Dance of the Hours.
- Downy used a parody version of the song in a 1985 commercial.
- K9 Advantix used a parody version of the song.
