= My Son, the Folk Singer =

Studio album by Allan Sherman
- Released: 1962
- Genre: Comedy music
- Length: 37:37
- Label: Warner Bros.

Allan Sherman chronology
My Son, the Folk Singer (1962)	My Son, the Celebrity (1963)

Professional ratings
Review scores
Source	Rating
Allmusic	4.5/5 stars

My Son, the Folk Singer is the debut studio album by American satirist musician Allan Sherman, released by Warner Bros. Records in 1962. On the album sleeve, the title appears directly below the words "Allan Sherman's mother presents".

The album, recorded before a live audience, is filled with reference to Jewish culture and in-jokes. His second album followed suit. The album was nominated for a Grammy Award for Album of the Year (other than classical) at the 5th Annual Grammy Awards.

== Track listing ==
=== Side One ===
1. "The Ballad of Harry Lewis" ("The Battle Hymn of the Republic")
2. "Shake Hands with Your Uncle Max" ("Dear Old Donegal", a.k.a. "Shake Hands with Your Uncle Mike")
3. "Sir Greenbaum's Madrigal" ("Greensleeves")
4. "My Zelda" ("Matilda")
5. "The Streets of Miami" ("The Streets of Laredo")

=== Side Two ===
1. "Sarah Jackman" (with Christine Nelson) ("Frère Jacques")
2. "Jump Down, Spin Around (Pick a Dress o' Cotton)" ("Pick a Bale of Cotton")
3. "Seltzer Boy" ("Waterboy")
4. "Oh Boy" (Las Chiapanecas a.k.a. "The Hand Clapping Song")
5. "Shticks and Stones" ("Jimmy Crack Corn" / "Jamaica Farewell" / "Little David, Play On Your Harp" / "St. James Infirmary" / "God Rest Ye Merry, Gentlemen" / "When the Saints Go Marching In" / "Joshua Fit the Battle of Jericho" / "I Will Give my Love an Apple" / "Camptown Races" / "The Yellow Rose of Texas" / "Shortnin' Bread")

== Chart positions ==
Chart (1962)	Peak position
Billboard Top LPs—Monaural	1

== Songs ==
Almost all the songs on the album contain some Jewish reference, or at least a main character or characters with apparently Jewish names.

- "The Ballad of Harry Lewis" is a parody of the Battle Hymn of the Republic, and includes many puns: "His name was Harry Lewis, and he worked for Irving Roth/He died while cutting velvet on a hot July the Fourth.", and "Oh Harry Lewis perished / In the Service of his Lord / He was trampling through the warehouse / Where the Drapes of Roth are stored."
- "Shake Hands with Your Uncle Max" is replete with Jewish surnames (..."Blumburger, Schlumberger, Minkus, and Pincus, and Stein with an 'e-i' and Styne with a 'y.'" The last two words of the song ("Welcome home"), however, are sung with an Irish accent, a tribute to the original song, Dear Old Donegal, which contains the lyric "Shake hands with your Uncle Mike."
- "Sir Greenbaum's Madrigal" gets topical (and punny), taking up the subject of smoking: "All day with the slaying and slewing and smiting and smoting like Robin Hood/Oh, wouldst I could kick the habit and give up smoting for good") Sir Greenbaum, a medieval knight, also laments: "Foresooth, 'tis a sorry plight, that engendered my attitude bluish/ You see, I don't wanna be a knight, that's no job for a boy who is Jewish."
- "My Zelda, my Zelda, my Zelda, she took the money and ran with the tailor!" "Oh why did she go and fall in love? I haven't seen her since Tisha B'Av!"
- "As I wandered out on the streets of Miami / I said to mine-self, 'This is some fancy town...' " The singer tells of a gunfight with his business partner in a quarrel over the partner's staying at the Fontainebleau Miami Beach and charging it to the firm. The narrator shoots, and then "Sam crumbled, just like a piece halva..."
- "Sarah Jackman, Sarah Jackman, How's by you? How's by you? How's by you the family? How's your sister Emily? etc." (Jackman pronounced "JOCK-man"). "How's your cousin Shirley?" "She got married early." "How's your uncle Sidney?" "They took out a kidney" etc. The second verse had her asking the questions, "Jerry Bachman, so what's new?" etc. (Sung to the tune of Frere Jacques.)
  - The liner notes for the next album claimed that "Sarah Jackman" was so popular that U.S. President John F. Kennedy had been heard singing it. Sherman also reported that story on p. 20 of his autobiography, A Gift of Laughter.
- "The Ballad of 'Oh Boy'", as Sherman called it, is sort of a reading-and-response song, in which Sherman merely says the phrase "Oh Boy" with differing inflections to express different reactions, for example:
  - [Chorus] Thunderbirds and Cadillacs? [Sherman] (delighted) Oh Boy!;
  - [Chorus] April fifteenth Income Tax? [Sherman] (irritated) Oh Boy."
- "Shticks and Stones" is a medley of short ditties. For example:
  - I'm upside down, my head is turning around, because I've got to sell the house in Levittown! (Jamaica Farewell by Harry Belafonte)
  - Yasha got a bottle of Geritol... and he knocked a hole in the wall! ("Joshua Fit de Battle ob Jericho")
  - I'm Melvin Rose of Texas, my friends all call me Tex... ("The Yellow Rose of Texas")
