= Dance of the Hours =

Short ballet from Amilcare Ponchielli's opera La Gioconda

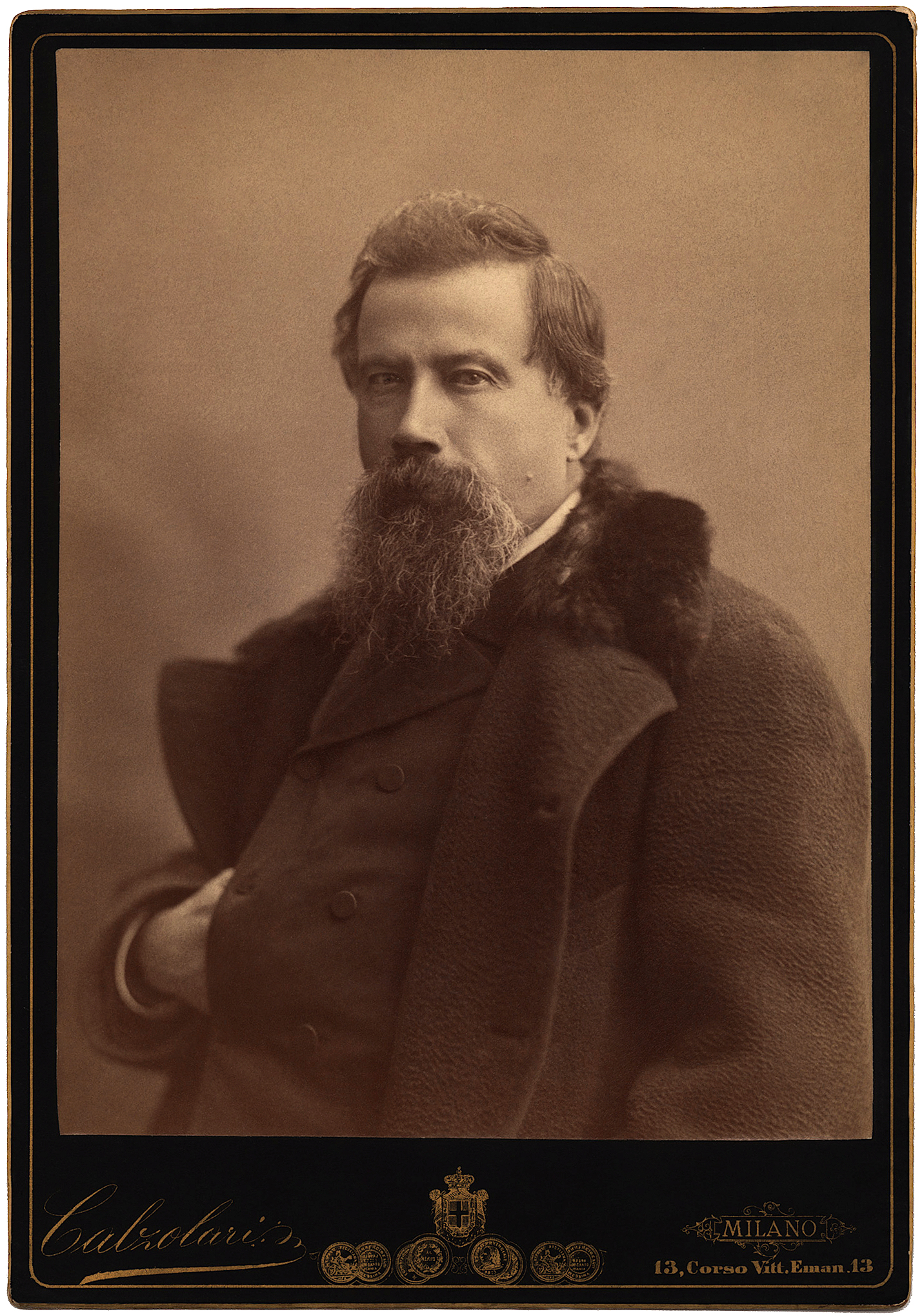
Amilcare Ponchielli, the composer, c. 1870s

Dance of the Hours (Italian: Danza delle ore) is a short ballet and is part of the Act III finale of the opera La Gioconda composed by Amilcare Ponchielli. It depicts the hours of the day through solo and ensemble dances. The opera was first performed in 1876 and was revised in 1880. Later performed on its own, the Dance of the Hours was at one time one of the best known and most frequently performed ballets. It became even more widely known after its inclusion in the 1940 Walt Disney animated film Fantasia where it is depicted as a comic ballet featuring ostriches, hippopotamuses, elephants and alligators.

== Description ==
The ballet, accompanied by an orchestra, appears near the end of the third act of the opera, in which the character Alvise, who heads the Inquisition, receives his guests in a large and elegant ballroom adjoining the death chamber. The music and choreography represent the hours of dawn, day (morning), twilight and night. Costume changes and lighting effects reinforce the progression. The dance is intended to symbolize the eternal struggle between the forces of light and darkness. It is about 10 minutes long.

== Structure ==
Dance of the Hours
Violinist João Pedro Cunha, 2005

The piece begins with an introduction in G major, with vocal assistance in the form of a recitative which is omitted in the symphonic version. Then follows in sequence: the dance of the hours of dawn, the hours of day, the hours of the night and the morning.

The episode devoted to dawn (in E major) merges with the extensive introduction to the episode dedicated to daytime hours, anticipating the rhythmic structure of four notes, which characterizes the episode. The transition point between the two episodes, where it marks the birth of the day, coincides with the intervention in fortissimo of the chorus ("Prodigio! Incanto!"), which follows a slow chromatic passage, typical of Ponchielli's style.

After a brief episode in C♯ minor devoted to the night, based on figuration in staccato, a connected and expressive melody in E minor, played by cellos, introduces the morning. A new pathetic melody in A minor extends to a broad phrase with initial tone in E minor.

A brief diminuendo precedes the attacca of the final coda in A major, a vigorous can-can in the manner of Romualdo Marenco's Ballo Excelsior (1881), introduced by an abrupt change of tempo to allegro vivacissimo.

== In popular culture ==
A tune from part of the ballet was used by comedian Allan Sherman for his comic novelty song "Hello Muddah, Hello Fadduh", about a summer camper writing home to tell all the terrible things happening at camp. It was reused by Frank Sinatra's daughter Nancy Sinatra for her recording "Like I Do".
