= Bunny hop jump =

Jump in figure skating

The bunny hop is typically one of the first jumps learned by beginning figure skaters. It is a non-rotational jump performed while skating forward in a straight line. The name and the jump date back to at least the 1930s.

To perform a bunny hop, the skater approaches the jump by stroking forward in a straight line, steps onto the jumping foot, then jumps up off the ice with the other leg scissoring forward and up past the jumping leg. The landing is on the toe pick of the scissoring foot, immediately pushing onto the jumping foot. During the jump, the arms are moved in an exaggerated walking motion, with the arm opposite to the leading foot in front and the other behind. It is possible to do bunny hops in series on the same foot, or to alternate feet.

In addition to being used to introduce beginners to jumping, bunny hops are sometimes used by advanced skaters as a connecting move or as a small leap for choreographic effect.
