= The Near Future =

Song written by Irving Berlin

"The Near Future" is a song written by Irving Berlin and performed in the Ziegfeld Follies of 1919. It is better known for the small part of its lyric that took on a life of its own: "How Dry I Am".

== Origins ==
The origins of the song and its components are somewhat obscure, as are the factors that differentiate "The Near Future" from "How Dry I Am".

=== Melody ===
The origin of the melody predates Berlin's song. The distinctive four-note motif was used by Ludwig van Beethoven in his Sonata, Op. 10 No. 3, published in 1798. The motif is also used in Oh Happy Day, the earliest known printing of which is in The Wesleyan Sacred Harp from Boston in 1855 (although the words to Oh Happy Day can be traced even further back to 1755). This melody is in turn attributed to English composer Edward F. Rimbault.

The notes' positions in the major scale are 5 < 1 < 2 < 3 as numbered diatonically and 8 < 1 < 3 < 5 as numbered chromatically (e.g., G < C < D < E in C major, C < F < G < A in F major, and D < G < A < B in G major).

The transition of the melody from a hymn to a song associated with drinking caused some confusion. In one example from 1931, courthouse chimes playing "Oh Happy Day" were thought by "respectable Minnesotans" to be playing "How Dry I Am".

=== Lyrics ===
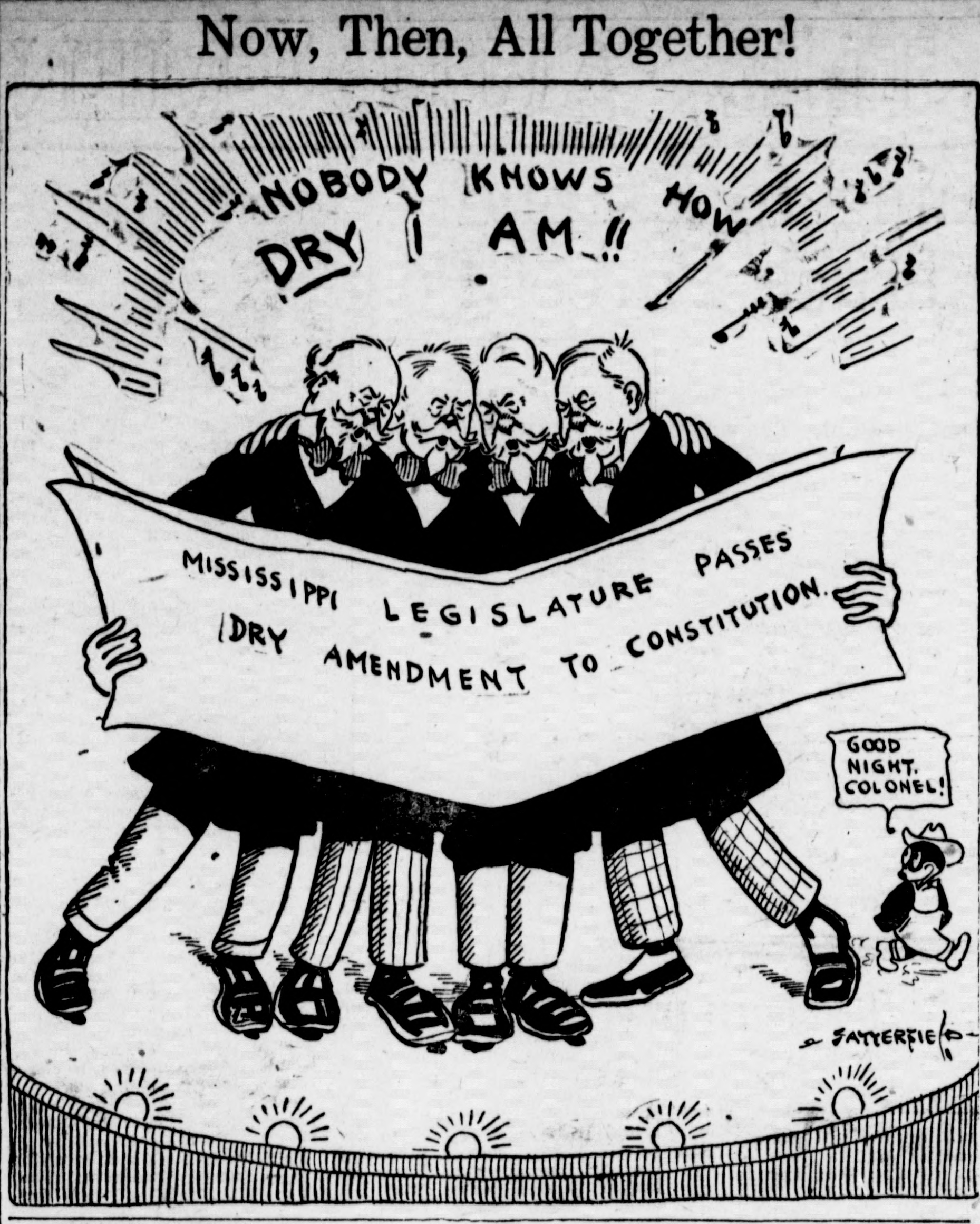
Bob Satterfield cartoon in The Tacoma Times (January 16, 1918), after the Mississippi legislature passed a dry amendment to the state constitution

The term "Dry" in the lyrics means abstinence from alcohol. While the lyrics are often associated with Prohibition in America, the lyrics were written before 1920. An early precursor to the lyrics was published in an 1874 edition of Gem of the West and Soldiers' Friend, a journal of curious miscellany. The passage describes a "sleeping car adventure" in which "one lady exclaimed in a slow and solemn voice, 'Oh, how dry I am'" several times until someone brings her some water, after which "came the same solemn tones, 'Oh, how dry I was,'" much to the annoyance of the rest of the passengers on the train.

The phrase "how dry I am" had become structured into song and referred specifically to drinking alcohol by at least 1898, as one journal describes a college drinking song that goes:

How dry I am, How dry I am!
God only knows How dry I am.

When the State of Kansas passed a Prohibition law in 1917, which was signed by the governor on "the 23rd" [of February or March] the legislature greeted the event by singing "How Dry I Am". This also strongly suggests that a song with these lyrics existed prior to Irving Berlin's treatment of the melody.

A 1919 book entitled Out and about: A Note-book of London in War-time describes a group of Americans drinking in London and singing "some excellent numbers of American marching-songs," including one described as "the anthem of the 'dry' States" whose lyrics were:

Nobody knows how dry I am, How dry I am, How dry I am.
You don't know how dry I am, How dry I am, How dry I am.
Nobody knows how dry I am, And nobody cares a damn.

The 1921 musical comedy Up In The Clouds included a similar song entitled "How Dry I Am" with music by Tom A. Johnstone and words by Will B. Johnstone.

== Musical influence ==
"How Dry I Am" (also widely heard in the variant form, "How Dry Am I") has come to represent a four-pitch sequence widely used to begin both popular and classical works.

Other songs influenced by the melody include Will B. Johnstone and Benny Bell. There is an old Greek song called Bufetzis (Μπουφετζής) written by Yiorgos Batis made with the music of "How Dry I Am". Composer, television producer, and humorist Allan Sherman included in his concert album Peter and the Commissar a quodlibet titled "Variations On 'How Dry I Am'" and quoting works ranging from "Home on the Range" to "The Flying Trapeze" to the final section of the William Tell overture and the Russian military theme from Tchaikovsky's 1812 Overture.

The song is used as the theme of P. D. Q. Bach's fugue in F major from The Short-Tempered Clavier (S. 3.14159265, easy as).

In a 1959 television broadcast titled "The Infinite Variety of Music", Leonard Bernstein found similarities between the opening notes of "How Dry I Am" and 22 other well-known melodies: the French song fr:Il était une bergère, the Moldau (Vltava) theme from Smetana's Má vlast, the waltz from Lehár's The Merry Widow, Handel's Water Music, Schubert's Arpeggione Sonata, the second movement of Beethoven's Symphony No.2, Brahms's Piano Concerto No.1, the ending of Strauss's Death and Transfiguration, the nocturne from Mendelssohn's Midsummer Night's Dream, the Simple Gifts melody used by Aaron Copland in Appalachian Spring, the 1956 song The Party's Over from the musical Bells Are Ringing, Strauss's Till Eulenspiegel's Merry Pranks, the Westminster chimes, Sweet Adeline, the finale of Prokofiev's 5th symphony, Wagner's Siegfried, the finale of Brahms's symphony no.1, Strauss's Salome and Der Rosenkavalier, Beethoven's Pathétique Sonata, the overture to Raymond by Ambroise Thomas, and the finale of Shostakovich's fifth symphony.

== Use in popular culture ==
This portion of the song...

How dry I am, how dry I am
It's plain to see just why I am
No alcohol in my highball
And that is why so dry I am

... became known for its ironic use as a drinking song in all manner of popular media, especially Warner Bros. cartoons, in which the song became a stock substitute for the explicit mention of alcohol and/or drunkenness. That use of the song necessitated removing any phrases in it that overtly mention drinking, leading to its frequently being condensed to these two lines:

How dry I am, how dry I am
Nobody knows how dry I am... Hooow dryyy I aaaaaam!

A Westinghouse clothes dryer from 1953 played the song when clothes were dry.

The Salvation Army, to celebrate sobriety, uses the song (without lyrics) in both band and piano arrangements, in street concerts and meetings. This may be one reason for the raucous band arrangement of Bob Dylan's "Rainy Day Women #12 & 35" (a.k.a. "Everybody Must Get Stoned") from his album Blonde on Blonde. Apparently the producer and Dylan agreed at 4:30 in the morning that they wanted the sound of a Salvation Army band.
