= Hello Muddah, Hello Faddah! (musical) =

Musical

Hello Muddah, Hello Fadduh!
- Basis: Allan Sherman's song
- Productions: limited run October 17, 2002- January 5, 2003; New Yorker Theatre, Toronto

Hello Muddah, Hello Fadduh! is a musical revue based on the song "Hello Muddah, Hello Fadduh" by Allan Sherman and Lou Busch. It is the life story of Barry Brockman (Darrin Barker) and his lifelong sweetheart Sarah Jackman (Eliza Jane Scott) from birth to early education, summer camp to marriage, and parenthood in suburban New York to Florida retirement. Songs include the title song, "Harvey and Sheila" (to the tune of "Hava Nagila"), and "Glory, Glory Harry Lewis" ("Battle Hymn of the Republic").
