= Imidacloprid/permethrin/pyriproxyfen =

Veterinary drug

Combination of
- Imidacloprid: Insecticide
- Permethrin: Pyrethroid insecticide
- Pyriproxyfen: Insecticide

Clinical data
- Trade names: K9 Advantix II

Imidacloprid/permethrin/pyriproxyfen, sold under the trade name K9 Advantix II, is a combination insecticide product for dogs, used for the treatment and prevention of an array of common external parasites. It is effective against fleas, ticks, chewing lice and mosquitoes. The active ingredients are imidacloprid, permethrin, and pyriproxyfen. This product is toxic to cats, and it is not recommended for use on dogs which share an environment with cats. The product is applied onto the skin; administration of the product into the mouth can cause adverse effects.
