= Allan Sherman =

American musician and comedian (1924–1973)

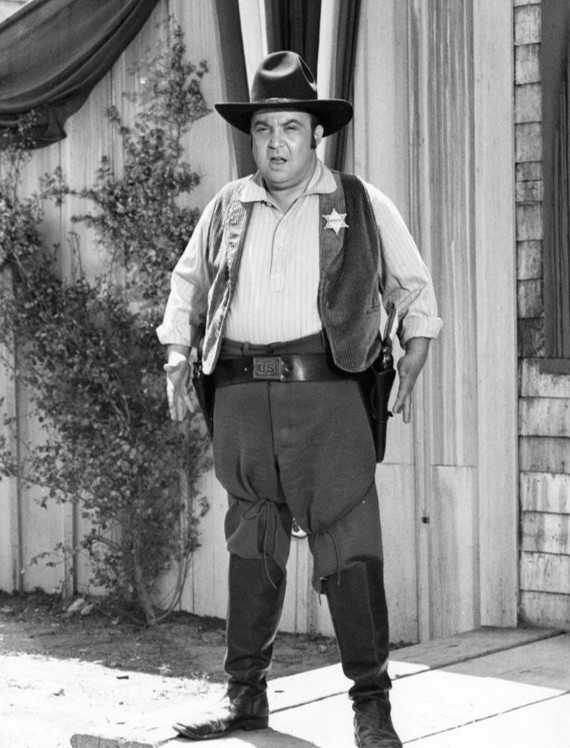
- Sherman as a sheriff on The Loner in 1965
- Born: Allan Copelon; November 30, 1924; Chicago, Illinois, U.S.
- Died: November 20, 1973 (aged 48); Los Angeles, California, U.S.
- Resting place: Hillside Memorial Park Cemetery
- Occupations: Singer; comedian; producer; writer
- Years active: 1951–1973
- Spouse: Dee Chackes (m. 1945; div. 1966)
- Children: 2

Allan Sherman (born Allan Copelon or Allan Gerald Copelon; November 30, 1924 – November 20, 1973) was an American musician, comedian, and television producer who became known as a song parodist in the early 1960s. His first album, My Son, the Folk Singer (1962), became the fastest-selling record album up to that time. His biggest hit was "Hello Muddah, Hello Fadduh", a comic song in which a boy describes his summer camp experiences to the tune of Ponchielli's Dance of the Hours.

== Early life ==
Sherman was born on November 30, 1924, in Chicago, to Percy Copelon and Rose Sherman. Percy was an auto mechanic and racecar driver from Birmingham, Alabama who suffered from obesity (he weighed over 350 pounds) and died while attempting a 100-day diet. Sherman's family was Jewish. His parents divorced when he was seven, and he adopted his mother's maiden name. Because his parents frequently moved to new residences, he attended 21 public schools in Chicago, New York, Los Angeles, and Miami. He attended Fairfax High School in Los Angeles where he graduated in 1941. He later attended the University of Illinois, where he earned mostly "C" grades and contributed a humor column to The Daily Illini, the college newspaper. He was expelled for breaking into the Sigma Delta Tau sorority house with his girlfriend and future wife, Dolores "Dee" Chackes.

== Television writer and producer ==
Sherman devised a game show with comedy writer Howard Merrill, which he intended to call I Know a Secret. Television producer Mark Goodson adapted Sherman's idea into I've Got a Secret, which ran on CBS from 1952 to 1967. Rather than pay him for the concept, Mark Goodson-Bill Todman Productions made Sherman the show's producer; Merrill was paid a royalty—reported in 1966 as $250 weekly—and withdrew from the project. "You couldn't help but be fond of Allan, as long as you didn't have to work with him," recalled Goodson-Todman executive Gil Fates. "Notice I said with him. He was always kind and understanding to those who worked for him." Sherman clashed with anyone who disagreed with his ideas or tried to restrain his creativity. As producer of I've Got a Secret, which was broadcast live, he showed a fondness for large-scale stunts that teetered on the brink of disaster. He once released 100 rabbits onstage as an Easter surprise for the Madison Square Boys Club, whose members were seated in the studio. The boys were invited to come up onstage to collect their prize. Although the resultant melee made a good story, it did not necessarily make for good television. Fates saw that host Garry Moore, "who was out on stage trying to protect the bunnies as best he could, realized that the spot was beyond salvage. Most of the kids gave back the rabbits".

In his autobiography A Gift of Laughter, Sherman writes that he was fired from I've Got a Secret in 1958, the night when guest star Tony Curtis demonstrated childhood street games. First, Curtis had never heard of the games that Sherman wanted to stage, resulting in awkward reenactments. Then, according to Sherman, Henry Morgan was left short of scripted material by seven minutes, and Morgan filled the time by berating Sherman on air. However, the episode in question does not run short. Morgan ends it abruptly and says that they have run out of time. "The spot was not only a fiasco but also a catastrophe," recalled Fates. "That show was Goodson's last straw and Allan's last I've Got a Secret. Within hours, the reaction from the network and the sponsors was in, and Allan was out." Sherman was replaced by associate producer Chester Feldman.

Sherman also produced a short-lived 1954 game show What's Going On?, which was technologically ambitious, with studio guests interacting with multiple live cameras in remote locations. In 1961, he produced a daytime game show for Al Singer Productions called Your Surprise Package, which aired on CBS with host George Fenneman.

== Song parodies ==
In 1951, Sherman recorded a 78-rpm single with veteran singer Sylvia Froos that contains "A Satchel and a Seck", parodying "A Bushel and a Peck" from Guys and Dolls, coupled with "Jake's Song", parodying "Sam's Song", a contemporary hit for Bing Crosby and his son Gary. The single sold poorly and when Sherman wrote his autobiography, he did not mention it. Later, he found that the song parodies he performed to amuse his friends and family were taking on a life of their own. Sherman lived in the Brentwood section of West Los Angeles next door to Harpo Marx, who invited him to perform his song parodies at parties attended by Marx's show-biz friends. After one party, George Burns phoned an executive at Warner Bros. Records and persuaded him to sign Sherman to a contract. The result was an LP of these parodies, My Son, the Folk Singer, released in 1962. It sold over one million copies, and was awarded a gold disc. The album was very successful and was quickly followed by My Son, the Celebrity.

Capitalizing on his success, in 1962 Jubilee Records re-released Sherman's 1951 single on the album More Folk Songs by Allan Sherman and His Friends, which compiled material by various Borscht Belt comedians such as Sylvia Froos, Fyvush Finkel and Lee Tully.

Sherman's first two LPs were mainly reworkings of public-domain folk songs to infuse them with Jewish humor. His first minor hit was "Sarah Jackman" (pronounced "Jockman"), a takeoff of "Frère Jacques" in which he and a woman (Christine Nelson) exchange family gossip. The popularity of "Sarah Jackman" (as well as the album My Son, the Folk Singer) was enhanced after President John F. Kennedy was overheard singing the song in the lobby of the Carlyle hotel. By his peak with My Son, the Nut in 1963, however, Sherman had broadened both his subject matter and his choice of parody material and begun to appeal to a larger audience.

Sherman wrote his parody lyrics in collaboration with Lou Busch. A few of the Sherman/Busch songs are completely original creations, featuring original music as well as lyrics, rather than new lyrics applied to an existing melody.

However, Sherman had trouble in getting permission to record for profit from some well-known composers and lyricists, who did not tolerate parodies or satires of their melodies and lyrics, including Irving Berlin, Richard Rodgers, Ira Gershwin, Meredith Willson, Alan Jay Lerner, and Frederick Loewe, as well as the estates of Lorenz Hart, Oscar Hammerstein, Kurt Weill, George Gershwin and Bertolt Brecht, which prevented him from releasing parodies or satires of their songs. In the late 1950s, Sherman was inspired by a recording of a nightclub musical show called My Fairfax Lady, a parody of My Fair Lady set in the Jewish section of Los Angeles that was performed at Billy Gray's Band Box. Sherman then wrote his own song parodies of My Fair Lady, which appeared as a bootleg recording in 1964, and were officially released in 2005 on My Son, the Box. Alan Jay Lerner did not approve of having the parody being performed; however, he reluctantly settled to allow the performances of "Fairfax Lady", on the strict conditions that the show could be allowed to be performed only inside the Fairfax Theater, without any touring company, and that the musical could not be videotaped or recorded for any album.

Although Sherman believed that all the songs parodied on My Son, the Folk Singer were in the public domain, two of them, "Matilda" and "Water Boy"–parodied as "My Zelda" and "Seltzer Boy", respectively–were actually under copyright, and Sherman was sued for copyright infringement.

In 1963's My Son, the Nut, Sherman's pointed parodies of classical and popular tunes dealt with automation in the workplace ("Automation", to the tune of "Fascination"), space travel ("Eight Foot Two, Solid Blue", to "Five Foot Two, Eyes of Blue"), summer camp ("Hello Muddah, Hello Fadduh", to the tune of Dance of the Hours by Ponchielli), the exodus from the city to the suburbs ("Here's to the Crabgrass", to the tune of "English Country Garden"), and his own bulky physique ("Hail to Thee, Fat Person", which claims his obesity was a public service similar to the Marshall Plan). Seven cartoon bears were printed on back of every album.

== A Top 40 hit ==
One track from My Son, the Nut, a spoof of summer camp titled "Hello Muddah, Hello Fadduh", became a surprise novelty hit, reaching No. 2 on the national Billboard Hot 100 chart for three weeks in late summer 1963. The lyrics were sung to the tune of one segment of Ponchielli's Dance of the Hours. That December, Sherman's "The Twelve Gifts of Christmas" single appeared on Billboard's separate Christmas chart. Sherman had one other Top 40 hit, a 1965 take-off on the Petula Clark hit "Downtown" called "Crazy Downtown", which spent one week at #40. Two other Sherman singles charted in the lower regions of the Billboard 100: an updated "Hello Mudduh, Hello Fadduh" (#59 in 1964), and "The Drinking Man's Diet" (#98 in 1965). Sherman's "The End of a Symphony", spotlighting Arthur Fiedler's Boston Pops Orchestra, reached #113 on the "Bubbling Under" chart in 1964, but did not make the Hot 100.

The songs on Sherman's next album My Name Is Allan (1965) were thematically connected: except for a couple of original novelty songs with music by Sherman and Busch, all the songs on the album are parodies of songs that had won, or were nominated for, the Academy Award for Best Song. They included "That Old Black Magic", "Secret Love", "The Continental", "Chim Chim Cher-ee" and "Call Me Irresponsible". The cover of the album bore a childhood photograph of Sherman. That, and the album's title, were references to Barbra Streisand's album My Name Is Barbra, released earlier that year, which featured a cover photograph of the singer as a young girl.

During his brief heyday, Sherman's parodies were so popular that he had at least one contemporary imitator: My Son the Copycat was an album of song parodies performed by Stanley Ralph Ross, co-written by Ross and Bob Arbogast. Lest there be any doubt of whom Ross is copying, his album's cover bears a crossed-out photo of Sherman. One of the songs on this album is a fat man's lament, "I'm Called Little Butterball", parodying "I'm Called Little Buttercup" from Gilbert and Sullivan's operetta HMS Pinafore. Sherman, who was genuinely overweight unlike Ross, would later parody this same song as "Little Butterball" – with the same subject matter – on his album Allan in Wonderland. Sherman also parodied Gilbert and Sullivan's "Titwillow" from The Mikado, in the song "The Bronx Bird-Watcher" (on My Son, the Celebrity), as well as several other Gilbert and Sullivan songs.

== Later work ==
In 1965, Sherman published an autobiography, A Gift of Laughter, and, for a short period at least, he was culturally ubiquitous. He sang on and guest-hosted The Tonight Show, was involved in the production of Bill Cosby's first three albums, appeared in the Macy's Thanksgiving Day Parade, and sang "The Dropouts' March" on the March 6, 1964, edition of the NBC satirical program That Was The Week That Was.

Also in 1964, Sherman narrated his own version of Prokofiev's Peter and the Wolf in a live concert at Tanglewood with the Boston Pops under Arthur Fiedler. The concert, which was released by RCA Victor Red Seal as the album Peter and the Commissar, also included "Variations on 'How Dry I Am'", with Sherman as conductor, and "The End of a Symphony". In "Variations", Fiedler was the guest soloist, providing solo hiccups. In 2004, Collector's Choice reissued the complete RCA Victor album on CD.

Sherman's later albums grew more pointedly satirical and less light-hearted, skewering protesting students ("The Rebel"), consumer debt ("A Waste of Money", based on "A Taste of Honey"), and the generation gap ("Crazy Downtown" and "Pop Hates the Beatles"). It was for this reason that Ken Barnes, when attempting to analyze American music acts that were harmed by the British Invasion, surmised in 2021 that Sherman had been doomed to lose momentum anyway and could not blame the Invasion for his career decline (even as "Crazy Downtown" was a top-40 hit for him).

Sherman was often tapped to produce specialty song parodies for corporations. An album of six paper-cup and vending machine related songs, titled Music to Dispense With, was created for the Container Division of the Scott Paper Company for distribution to its vendors and customers. It consisted of the tracks "Makin' Coffee" (a parody of "Makin' Whoopee"), "Vending Machines", "There Are Cups", "That's How the Change Is Made", "The Wonderful Tree in the Forest" and "Scott Cups".

Sherman also created a group of eight "public education" radio spots for Encron carpet fibers, singing their praises to the tunes of old public-domain songs. Entitled Allan Sherman Pours It On for Carpets Made with Encron Polyester, it featured an introduction by Sherman and comprised the tracks "Encron Is a Brand New Fiber" (to the tune of the Michael Renzi-Jack Norworth-Nora Bayes hit "Shine On, Harvest Moon"), "Put Them All Together, They Spell Encron" (to the tune of Theodore Morse and E. Johnson Howard's "M-O-T-H-E-R"), "There's a Fiber Called Encron" (to the tune of William H. Hill's "There is a Tavern in the Town"), "Encron Alive, Alive-O" (to the tune of "Molly Malone"), "Encron's the Name", "Why They Call It Encron" (to the tune of "Let Me Call You Sweetheart"), "Encron, Encron" (to the tune of "Daisy Bell") and "Encron Is a Great New Fiber" (to the tune of "Take Me to the Fair").

== Decline ==
Sherman's career success was short-lived: after peaking in 1963, his popularity declined rather quickly. One analysis speculated the assassination of John F. Kennedy led to public ambivalence towards Sherman's brand of comedy. Beginning in 1964, Sherman was among many American acts whose sales were affected badly by the British Invasion (which Sherman skewered in the song "Pop Hates the Beatles", a spoof of "Pop! Goes the Weasel").

By 1965, Sherman had released two albums that did not make the Top 50 and in 1966, Warner Bros. Records dropped him from the roster. His last album for WB, Togetherness, was released in 1967 to poor reviews and poor sales. All of his previous releases had been recorded in front of a live studio audience – or in the case of Live, Hoping You Are the Same, recorded during a Las Vegas performance – but Togetherness was purely a studio recording, and the lack of an audience and their response affected the result, as did the nondescript backup singers and studio orchestra.

On November 13, 1965, Sherman made a rare primetime television acting appearance in "The Sheriff of Fetterman's Crossing," an episode of Rod Serling's short-lived Western series The Loner (1965–1966). Sherman played Walton Peterson Tetley, a local schnook who went off to war and rose to regiment cook before returning home a hero, thanks to tall tales and yarn-spinning. The town hails its conquering hero and Tetley is appointed sheriff. Series star Lloyd Bridges as William Colton, a wandering Union veteran, comes to town and signs on to be Tetley's deputy, discovering quickly his boss' utter incompetence in the office. Tetley receives a threatening note from a gunslinger challenging this purported hero to a gunfight when he arrives on the noon stage, at which point the story becomes a parody of iconic Western movie High Noon (1952). Colton sets to teaching the shivering-in-his-boots sheriff courage and gunmanship. Sherman's semi-serious and sympathetic performance was strong and his presence an affable one.

In 1966, Sherman visited Australia. He did a television series in Melbourne, Victoria, for a live audience. During the performance, he sang a parody of "Molly Malone." It included a play on the word "but" (butt) that did not elicit a laugh. What Sherman did not know is that Australians use the word "bum" where Americans would say "butt" (although usage of the word "butt" has since become widespread in Australia). Otherwise, Sherman was well received by the audience.

In 1969, Sherman wrote the book and lyrics – with music by Albert Hague – for The Fig Leaves Are Falling, a Broadway musical. The production was a flop that ran only four performances, despite being helmed by acclaimed director George Abbott and a cast that included established stars Barry Nelson, Dorothy Loudon, and David Cassidy. In 1973, Sherman published The Rape of the A*P*E*, which detailed his opinions on American religious fanaticism and the sexual revolution.

In 1971, Sherman was the voice of Dr. Seuss's The Cat in the Hat for the animated television special. He reprised the role for Dr. Seuss on the Loose, his last project before his death.

== Health problems and death ==
In his final years, Sherman's alcoholism and weight gain caused severe deterioration of his health; he later developed diabetes and lung disease. In 1966, his wife Dee filed for divorce and received full custody of their son and daughter.

Sherman lived on unemployment benefits for a time and moved into the Motion Picture & Television Country House and Hospital for a short time to lose weight. He died while entertaining his friends during the night of November 20, 1973, at his home in Los Angeles, ten days shy of his 49th birthday. According to sheriff's officers, Sherman, who had been undergoing treatment for emphysema, asthma, and obesity, died of respiratory failure. He is entombed in Culver City, California's Hillside Memorial Park Cemetery.

== Legacy ==
Sherman was the inspiration for a new generation of developing parodists such as "Weird Al" Yankovic, who pays homage to Sherman on the cover of his first LP by including a cartoon drawing of an Allan Sherman album cover.

Sherman's hit song "Hello Muddah, Hello Fadduh" has been translated into other languages. In one notable example, the Dutch–Swedish poet Cornelis Vreeswijk translated the song loosely into Swedish as "Brev från kolonien" (Letter from Summer Camp), which reached fourth on the Swedish popular music chart Svensktoppen in the summer of 1965 and is still popular in Sweden today.

A Best of Allan Sherman CD was released in 1990, and a boxed set of most of his songs was released in 2005 under the title My Son, the Box. In 1992 a musical revue of his songs titled Hello Muddah, Hello Faddah ran for over a year off-off-Broadway; other productions ran Off-Broadway for four months in 2001 and toured in 2003. A children's book based on the song "Hello Muddah, Hello Fadduh", with illustrations by Syd Hoff, was published in 2004.

On March 14, 2006, National Public Radio profiled Sherman on All Things Considered.

In 2010, eight of Allan Sherman's Warner Records albums were individually released on CD:

- My Son, the Folk Singer
- My Son, the Celebrity
- My Son, the Nut
- Allan in Wonderland
- For Swingin' Livers Only!
- My Name Is Allan
- Allan Sherman: Live! (Hoping You Are the Same)
- Togetherness.

Sherman's son Robert (not to be confused with others of that name in the show-business industry) became a game show producer, producing for Mark Goodson during the 1970s and 1980s, including Password Plus, Blockbusters, Body Language and Super Password.

== In popular culture ==
- Sherman's song "Ratt Fink" was covered by punk-rock band The Misfits on their 1979 single "Night of the Living Dead". It was also covered by Ex-Misfits guitarist Bobby Steele by his band The Undead. Sherman wrote the song as a parody of "Rag Mop," originally performed by Johnnie Lee Wills and popularized by The Ames Brothers in 1950.
- In the "Three Gays of the Condo" episode of The Simpsons, Homer asks "Weird Al" Yankovic which of two parody songs Homer sent him he preferred, and Yankovic replies that they were pretty much the same. Homer then mutters angrily, "Yeah, like you and Allan Sherman." Other references to Sherman came in the episode "Marge Be Not Proud", when Bart hides an answering machine tape in a copy of his (fictitious) Camp Granada album – "where no one would ever listen to it"; in another episode, where Homer flips through his meager collection of LPs which includes a copy of My Son, the Folk Singer; and in "A Midsummer's Nice Dream", where Homer shows Bart and Lisa his copy of another fictional Sherman album, Helter Shmelter: Sorry for the Mess.
- The political-parody group Capitol Steps used "Hello Muddah, Hello Fadduh" in Fools on the Hill (Songs of 1992).
- Dutch comedian Rijk de Gooyer sang two Dutch versions of "Hello Muddah, Hello Fadduh" named "Brief uit La Courtine" (Letter from La Courtine) and "Brief naar La Courtine" (Letter to La Courtine). In the first one, he describes his adventures as a soldier in the Dutch base at La Courtine; the second is his father's reply.

== Discography ==
=== Albums ===
Year	Title	Billboard 200	Record Label
1962	My Son, the Folk Singer	1	Warner Bros. Records
1963	More Folk Songs by Allan Sherman and His Friends		Jubilee
1963	My Son, the Celebrity	1	Warner Bros. Records
1963	My Son, the Nut	1	Warner Bros. Records
1964	Allan in Wonderland	25	Warner Bros. Records
1964	Peter and the Commissar	53	RCA Victor
1964	For Swingin' Livers Only!	25	Warner Bros. Records
1965	My Name Is Allan	88	Warner Bros. Records
1966	Allan Sherman: Live!!! (Hoping You Are the Same)	-	Warner Bros. Records
1967	Togetherness	-	Warner Bros. Records
2014	There Is Nothing Like a Lox: The Lost Song Parodies of Allan Sherman	-	Rockbeat Records / Smore

=== Singles ===
Year	Titles (A-side, B-side) Both sides from same album except where indicated	Chart positions			Album
Year	Titles (A-side, B-side) Both sides from same album except where indicated	US	AC	UK	Album
1963	"Hello Muddah, Hello Fadduh! (A Letter From Camp)" b/w "Rat Fink"	2	—	14	My Son, The Nut
1963	"The Twelve Gifts Of Christmas" b/w "(You Came A Long Way From St. Louis); You Went The Wrong Way, Old King Louie" (from My Son, The Nut)	5 (Christmas charts)	—	—	For Swingin' Livers Only!
1964	"My Son, The Vampire" b/w "I Can't Dance" (from Allan In Wonderland)	—	—	—	Non-album track
1964	"(Heart) Skin" b/w "The Drop-Outs March"	—	—	—	Allan In Wonderland
1964	"Hello Mudduh, Hello Fadduh! (A Letter From Camp)" (1964 version) b/w Original version of A-side (from My Son, The Nut)	59	9	—	Non-album track
1964	"The End Of A Symphony"—Part 1 b/w Part 2 With The Boston Pops Orchestra—Arthur Fiedler, conductor	113	—	—	Peter and The Commissar
1964	"Pop Hates The Beatles" b/w "Grow, Mrs. Goldfarb"; Unreleased	—	—	—	For Swingin' Livers Only!
1965	"Crazy Downtown" b/w "The Drop-Outs March" (from Allan In Wonderland)	40	6	—	Non-album track
1965	"The Drinking Man's Diet" b/w "The Laarge Daark Aardvark Song"	98	21	—	My Name Is Allan
1966	"Odd Ball" b/w "His Own Little Island"	—	—	—	Non-album tracks
1967	"Westchester Hadassah" b/w "Strange Things In My Soup"	—	—	—	Togetherness
1968	"The Fig Leaves Are Falling" b/w "Juggling"	—	—	—	Non-album tracks

=== Musical theater ===
- The Fig Leaves Are Falling (1969) – musical – lyricist and book-writer
  - Songs: "All Is Well in Larchmont," "Lillian," "All of My Laughter," "Give Me a Cause," "Today I Saw a Rose," "We," "For Our Sake," "Light One Candle," "Oh, Boy," "The Fig Leaves Are Falling," "For the Rest of My Life," "I Like It," "Broken Heart," "Old Fashioned Song," "Lillian, Lillian, Lillian," "Did I Ever Really Live?" The music was composed by Albert Hague.

== Filmography ==
- My Son, the Vampire (1963) introductory segment. Filmed repackage of the 1952 film Mother Riley Meets the Vampire.
- Fractured Flickers (one episode, 1963) as himself
- The Loner (one episode, 1965) as Walter Peterson Tetley
- The Cat in the Hat (1971) as The Cat in the Hat/Narrator (voice)
- Wacky Taxi (1972) as Nervous Man
- Dr. Seuss on the Loose (1973) as The Cat in the Hat (voice; final film role)

== See also ==
- Hello Muddah, Hello Faddah! (musical revue & children's book)
- Camp Granada
