= Grammy Award for Best Ethnic or Traditional Folk Recording =

Music award category

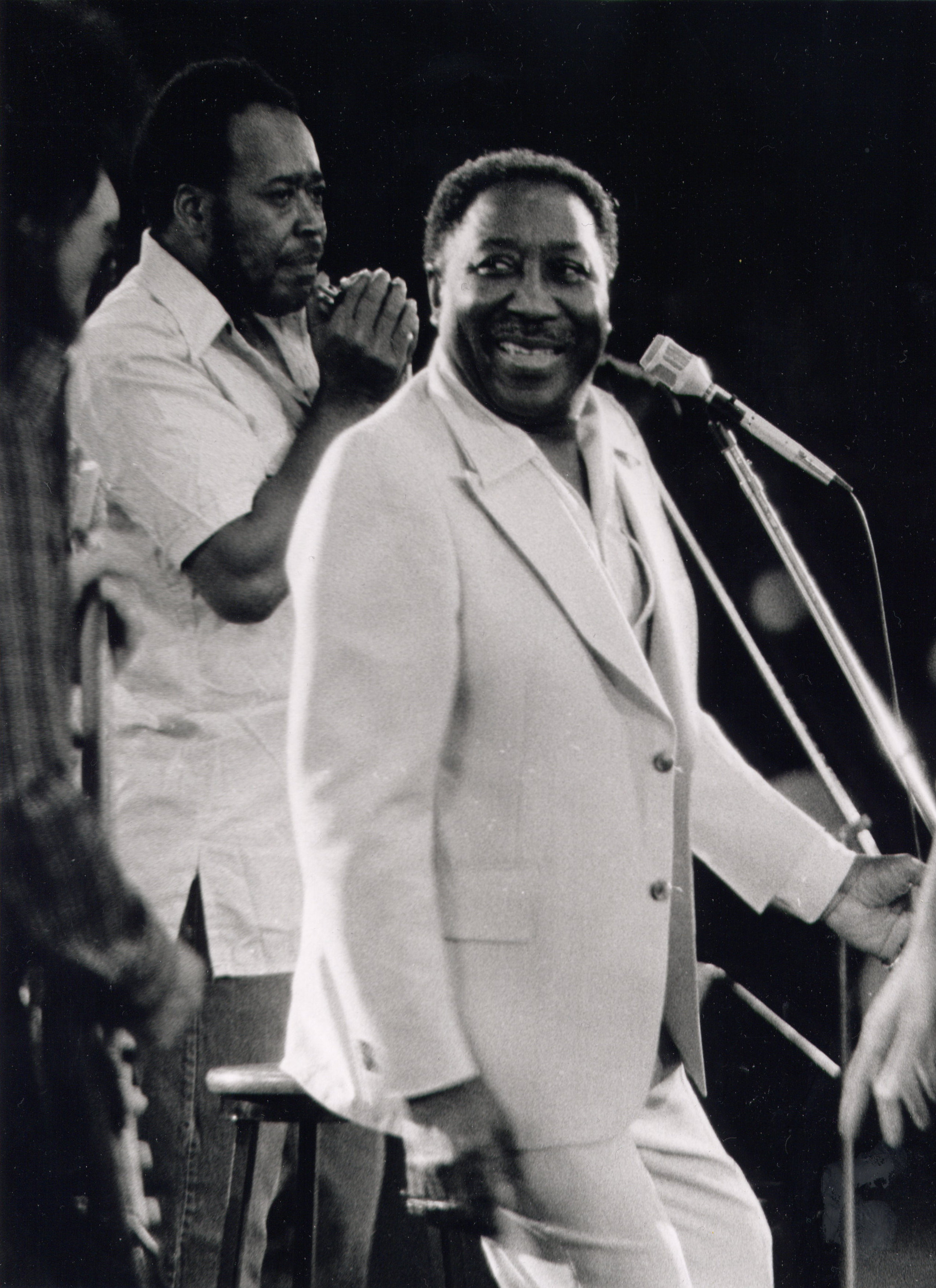
Muddy Waters, 1978

The Grammy Award for Best Ethnic or Traditional Folk Recording was awarded from 1960 to 1986. During this time the award had several minor name changes:

- From 1960 to 1961 the award was known as Best Performance - Folk
- From 1962 to 1967 it was awarded as Best Folk Recording
- From 1968 to 1970 it was awarded as Best Folk Performance
- In 1971 and from 1973 to 1974 the award was known as Best Ethnic or Traditional Recording (including traditional blues)
- In 1972 and from 1975 to 1982 it was awarded as Best Ethnic or Traditional Recording
- From 1983 to 1986 it was awarded as Best Ethnic or Traditional Folk Recording

In 1987 the award was split into two new awards: the Grammy Award for Best Traditional Folk Album and the Grammy Award for Best Contemporary Folk Album.

Years reflect the year in which the Grammy Awards were presented, for works released in the previous year.

== Winners and nominees ==
Year	Album	Artist(s)
1960
1960	The Kingston Trio at Large	The Kingston Trio
1960	Belafonte at Carnegie Hall	Harry Belafonte
1960	Tennessee Stud	Eddy Arnold
1960	The Wild, Wild West	The Ralph Hunter Choir
1960	The Wilderness Road	Jimmy Driftwood
1961
1961	Swing Dat Hammer	Harry Belafonte
1961	Cheers: Drinking Songs Around the World	The Belafonte Folk Singers
1961	Greenfields	The Brothers Four
1961	Here We Go Again!	The Kingston Trio
1961	Miriam Makeba	Miriam Makeba
1962
1962	The Belafonte Folk Singers... At Home and Abroad	The Belafonte Folk Singers
1962	The Big Bill Broonzy Story	Big Bill Broonzy
1962	The Clancy Brothers and Tommy Makem	The Clancy Brothers & Tommy Makem
1962	Folk Songs of Britain Vol. 1	Alan Lomax
1962	The Slightly Fabulous Limeliters	The Limeliters
1963
1963	If I Had a Hammer	Peter, Paul and Mary
1963	The Ballad of Jed Clampett	Flatt and Scruggs
1963	Bob Dylan	Bob Dylan
1963	Joan Baez in Concert	Joan Baez
1963	Midnight Special	Harry Belafonte
1963	Presenting The New Christy Minstrels	The New Christy Minstrels
1963	Something Special	The Kingston Trio
1964
1964	Blowin' in the Wind	Peter, Paul and Mary
1964	We Shall Overcome	Pete Seeger
1964	Walk Right In	The Rooftop Singers
1964	Green, Green	The New Christy Minstrels
1964	Judy Collins 3	Judy Collins
1964	Odetta Sings Folk Songs	Odetta
1964	The World of Miriam Makeba	Miriam Makeba
1965
1965	We'll Sing in the Sunshine	Gale Garnett
1965	Belafonte at The Greek Theatre	Harry Belafonte
1965	Peter, Paul and Mary in Concert	Peter, Paul and Mary
1965	Woody Guthrie: Library of Congress Recordings	Woody Guthrie
1965	The Times They Are a-Changin'	Bob Dylan
1965	Today	The New Christy Minstrels
1965	The Voice of Africa	Miriam Makeba
1966
1966	An Evening with Belafonte/Makeba	Harry Belafonte & Miriam Makeba
1966	The High Lonesome Sound	Roscoe Holcomb
1966	Makeba Sings!	Miriam Makeba
1966	A Song Will Rise	Peter, Paul and Mary
1966	Strangers and Cousins	Pete Seeger
1966	There but for Fortune	Joan Baez
1966	The Womenfolk Live at the Hungry I	The Womenfolk
1967
1967	Blues in the Street	Cortelia Clark
1967	God Bless the Grass	Pete Seeger
1967	Lead Belly	Lead Belly
1967	Oliver Smith	Oliver Smith
1967	Reflections in a Crystal Wind	Mimi & Richard Fariña
1967	Violets of Dawn	The Mitchell Trio
1968
1968	Gentle on My Mind	John Hartford
1968	Album 1700	Peter, Paul and Mary
1968	Alice's Restaurant	Arlo Guthrie
1968	In My Life	Judy Collins
1968	Janis Ian	Janis Ian
1968	Waist Deep in the Big Muddy	Pete Seeger
1969
1969	Both Sides, Now	Judy Collins
1969	Did She Mention My Name?	Gordon Lightfoot
1969	The Hangman's Beautiful Daughter	Incredible String Band
1969	John Wesley Harding	Bob Dylan
1969	Late Again	Peter, Paul and Mary
1969	The Unicorn	The Irish Rovers
1970
1970	Clouds	Joni Mitchell
1970	Any Day Now	Joan Baez
1970	Donovan	Donovan
1970	Bird on the Wire	Judy Collins
1970	Day is Done	Peter, Paul and Mary
1970	Young vs. Old	Pete Seeger
1971
1971	Good Feelin'	T-Bone Walker
1971	Black Music of South America	David Lewisohn
1971	Folk Fiddling From Sweden	Bjorn Stabi & Ole Hjorth
1971	I Do Not Play No Rock'n'Roll	Mississippi Fred McDowell
1971	Sail On	Muddy Waters
1971	Shree Rag	Ali Akbar Khan & Shankha Ghosh
1972
1972	They Call Me Muddy Waters	Muddy Waters
1972	18th Century Traditional Music of Japan	Keiko Matsuo
1972	The Esso Trinidad Steel Band	Esso Trinidad Steel Band
1972	Javanese Court Gamelan	Javanese Players
1972	Message to the Young	Howlin' Wolf
1972	Mississippi Fred McDowell	Mississippi Fred McDowell
1972	Stormy Monday Blues	T-Bone Walker
1973
1973	The London Muddy Waters Sessions	Muddy Waters
1973	Blues Piano Orgy	Various Artists
1973	Lightnin' Strikes	Lightnin' Hopkins
1973	Live at Soledad Prison	John Lee Hooker
1973	Walking the Blues	Otis Spann
1974
1974	Then and Now	Doc Watson
1974	Can't Get No Grindin'	Muddy Waters
1974	John Lee Hooker's Detroit	John Lee Hooker
1974	King Curtis & Champion Jack Dupree: Blues at Montreux	King Curtis & Champion Jack Dupree
1974	Lead Belly: Live in Concert	Lead Belly
1975
1975	Two Days in November	Doc Watson & Merle Watson
1975	Big Daddy	Bukka White
1975	The Back Door Wolf	Howlin' Wolf
1975	Catalyst	Willie Dixon
1975	London Revisited	Muddy Waters & Howlin' Wolf
1976
1976	The Muddy Waters Woodstock Album	Muddy Waters
1976	I Got What It Takes	Koko Taylor
1976	Memphis Blues	Memphis Slim
1976	Music of Guatemala	The San Lucas Band
1976	Wake Up Dead Man	Bruce Jackson
1977
1977	Mark Twang	John Hartford
1977	Bagpipe Marches and Music of Scotland	Shotts and Dykehead Caledonia Pipe Band
1977	Beware of the Dog!	Hound Dog Taylor
1977	If You Love These Blues, Play 'Em As You Please	Michael Bloomfield
1977	Proud Earth	Chief Dan George, Arliene Nofchissey Williams & Rick Brousseau
1978
1978	Hard Again	Muddy Waters
1978	Blues Hit Big Town	Junior Wells
1978	Right Place, Wrong Time	Otis Rush
1978	The Things That I Used to Do	Big Joe Turner
1978	What Happened to My Blues	Willie Dixon
1979
1979	I'm Ready	Muddy Waters
1979	Chicago Blues at Home	Various Artists
1979	Clifton Chenier and His Red Hot Louisiana Band in New Orleans	Clifton Chenier
1979	I Hear Some Blues Downstairs	Fenton Robinson
1979	U.S.A.	Memphis Slim & His House Rockers ft. Matt "Guitar" Murphy
1980
1980	Muddy "Mississippi" Waters Live	Muddy Waters
1980	The Chieftains 7	The Chieftains
1980	Ice Pickin'	Albert Collins
1980	Laugh Your Blues Away	Uncle Dave Macon
1980	Living Chicago Blues, Vol. 1	Shaw and the Wolf Gang & Left Hand Frank and His Blues Band
1980	Living Chicago Blues, Vol. 3	Lonnie Brooks Blues Band, Pinetop Perkins & Sons of Blues
1980	New England Traditional Fiddling	John Edwards Memorial Foundation
1980	New Orleans Jazz & Heritage Festival	Various Artists
1980	So Many Roads	Otis Rush
1981
1981	Rare Blues	Various Artists
1981	Atlanta Blues: '33	Various Artists
1981	The Chieftains 9: Boil the Breakfast Early	The Chieftains
1981	Kidney Stew Is Fine	Eddie "Cleanhead" Vinson
1981	Queen Ida & the Bon Temps Zydeco Band In New Orleans	Queen Ida
1982
1982	There Must Be a Better World Somewhere	B.B. King
1982	Blues Deluxe	Various Artists
1982	From the Heart of a Woman	Koko Taylor
1982	Frozen Alive!	Albert Collins
1982	Living Chicago Blues, Vol. 4	Various Artists
1983
1983	Queen Ida & The Bon Temps Zydeco Band On Tour	Queen Ida
1983	In the Tradition	The Boys of the Lough
1983	Live in America	The John Renbourn Group
1983	Metropolis	The Klezmorim
1983	Reggae Sunsplash '81: A Tribute to Bob Marley	Various Artists
1983	Tennessee: Folk Heritage - The Mountain	Various Artists
1984
1984	I'm Here	Clifton Chenier & His Red Hot Louisiana Band
1984	The Grey Fox	The Chieftains
1984	Raga Mishra Piloo	Ali Akbar Khan & Ravi Shankar
1984	Renaissance of the Celtic Harp	Alan Stivell
1984	Syncro System	King Sunny Adé
1985
1985	Elizabeth Cotten Live!	Elizabeth Cotten
1985	100% Fortified Zydeco	Buckwheat Zydeco
1985	Good Rockin'	Rockin' Dopsie
1985	On A Saturday Night	Queen Ida
1985	Open Road	Boys of the Lough
1986
1986	My Toot Toot	Rockin' Sidney
1986	Live at the San Francisco Blues Festival	Clifton Chenier
1986	Souvenirs	Dewey Balfa
1986	Turning Point	Buckwheat Zydeco
1986	Zydeco Gris Gris	BeauSoleil

== Individuals with multiple wins ==
6 wins

- Muddy Waters

2 wins

- Harry Belafonte
- Peter, Paul and Mary
- John Hartford
- Doc Watson
