= Walk Right In (album) =

Studio album by The Rooftop Singers
- Released: January 1963
- Recorded: 1962, United States
- Genre: Folk, Folk Revival, Folk-Pop
- Length: 40 minutes 40 seconds
- Label: Vanguard (US and Australia); Fontana (UK); His Master's Voice (New Zealand)

The Rooftop Singers chronology
Walk Right In (1963)	Good Time! (1964)

Walk Right In is the debut studio album by the American folk group The Rooftop Singers, released in 1963. The project received positive critical reception and reached the pop top 20 in 1963.

== Background and release ==
In 1962 the band released their debut single, "Walk Right In", which became a big commercial hit, reaching No. 1 in the US, and No. 10 in the UK. With that success they recorded another successful single, (Tom Cat, recorded in 1962, released in early 1963, peaked at No. 20 on the Hot 100). Following that, their debut album Walk Right In was released. It was available both in mono (VRS 9123) and stereo (VSD 2136). Both singles and their B-sides appear on the album.

== Chart performance ==
Much like the single, the album reached high chart positions as well. It debuted on Billboard magazine's Top LPs chart in the issue dated February 16, 1963, peaking at No. 15 during a twenty-week run on it. The album debuted on Cashbox magazine's 100 Top Albums chart in the issue dated February 9, 1963, reaching No. 12 during an eighteen-week run on it. It was their only charting album in the US. Although having success in the UK with their hit, the album failed to chart there.

== Reception ==
Professional ratings
Review scores
Source	Rating
AllMusic	2.5/5 stars
The Encyclopedia of Popular Music	4/5 stars
Cashbox	Positive

The album received a positive critical receptions upon its release. Cashbox magazine stated that the group "...tag this initial album after the biggie and include twelve other pleasing folk items," continuing that "The group’s distinctive vocal style and musical dexterity carry them in good stead as they offer 'Hey, Boys,' 'Top Cat' and 'You Don’t Know.'" Billboard magazine said that "The exciting new group have their first album, which features their smash single. Also spotlighted are a flock of infectious folk-pop readings." Noting that "Solid sales indicated."

Bruce Eder on AllMusic wrote that, "The title track is a bright, sprightly reworking of the 1929 Gus Cannon original, and the rest of the album is pretty much in that vein, showing off the trio's roots in blues ('You Don't Know'), gospel ('Somebody Came Home,' 'Travelin' Shoes'), ragtime ('Houston Special'), jazz, and even country & western ('Cool Water')." Eder also noted that Lynne Taylor gets one featured spot, with the children's song "Ha Ha Thisaway".

== Aftermath ==
The group recorded well into the 1960s, but never had the same success. According to critics, the album revealed the trio's strengths as well as its weaknesses. Bruce Eder noted: "Apart from the title track, the group was probably too diverse and serious for its own good -- they weren't pop-oriented enough to hold the larger audience attracted by the single."

Their next single only reached No. 55 on the Hot 100, and the following album completely missed the charts. They tried to release a single from Walk Right In in 1965, "Ham And Eggs", but it didn't sell and thus, failed to chart. Critically, Walk Right In was a success. The album was nominated for Best Folk Recording at the 6th Annual Grammy Awards, marking it as their only album to be nominated for any type of award.

== Track listing ==
Side one
No.	Title	Writer(s)	Length
1.	"Walk Right In"	Gus Cannon; Hosea Woods; Erik Darling; Bill Svanoe	3:37
2.	"Hey Boys"	Darling; Svanoe	2:09
3.	"Shoes"	Darling; Svanoe	3:59
4.	"Houston Special"	Darling; Svanoe	3:21
5.	"Tom Cat"	Darling; Taylor; Svanoe	2:09
6.	"Cool Water"	Bob Nolan	3:59
Total length:			19:14

Side two
No.	Title	Writer(s)	Length
7.	"Somebody Came Home"	Darling	2:12
8.	"You Don't Know"	Darling	3:31
9.	"Stagolee"	Traditional	3:17
10.	"Rained Five Days"	Darling; Svanoe	3:57
11.	"Ham and Eggs"	Darling; Sonny Geraci	3:36
12.	"Ha Ha Thisaway"	Traditional	2:35
13.	"Brandy Leave Me Alone"	Josef Marais	2:18
Total length:			21:26

== Accolades ==
Organization	Year	Category	Result	Ref.
Grammy Awards	1964	Best Folk Recording	Nominated	

== Charts ==
Chart peaks for Walk Right In
Chart (1963)	Peak position
US Billboard Top LP's (Monaural)	15
US Cash Box Top 100 Albums (Monaural)	12

== Personnel ==
All credits are adapted from the liner notes of Walk Right In.

- Erik Darling – vocals, guitar
- Bill Svanoe – vocals, guitar
- Lynne Taylor – vocals
- Wendell Marshall – bass
- Bobby Donaldson – drums
