= Streets I Have Walked =

Studio album by Harry Belafonte
- Released: 1963
- Recorded: 1963
- Genre: Vocal, folk
- Label: RCA Victor
- Producer: Bob Bollard

Harry Belafonte chronology
The Many Moods of Belafonte (1962)	Streets I Have Walked (1963)	Belafonte at The Greek Theatre (1964)

Professional ratings
Review scores
Source	Rating
Allmusic	3/5 stars
New Record Mirror	4/5 stars

Streets I Have Walked is an album by Harry Belafonte, released in 1963. The album contains songs from around the world as well as gospel songs. It reached No. 30 on the Billboard Top LPs, making it his last studio album to reach the top 40.

== Track listing ==
1. "Sit Down" – 2:29
2. "Erev Shel Shoshanim" (Moshe Dor, Yosef Hadar) – 3:11
3. "Waltzing Matilda" (Traditional) – 3:14
4. "My Old Paint" (Traditional) – 3:27
5. "Mangwene Mpulele" (Traditional) – 3:30
6. "This Land Is Your Land" (Woody Guthrie) – 3:02
7. "Tunga" (John P. Gonsalves) – 3:13
8. "Sakura" (Traditional Japanese. English lyrics by Marilyn Keith and Alan Bergman) – 3:57
9. "Amen" (Jester Hairston) – 3:05
10. "The Borning Day" (Fred Hellerman, Fran Minkoff) – 3:31
11. "This Wicked Race" – 3:05
12. "Come Away Melinda" (Hellerman, Minkoff) – 2:28

== Personnel ==
- Harry Belafonte – vocals
- William Eaton – guitar
- Ernie Calabria – guitar
- Jay Berliner – guitar
- John Cartwright – bass
- Percy Brice – drums
- Ralph MacDonald – percussion
- Springfield Gardens Junior High School No. 59 Choir – vocals
- Kimio Eto – koto on track 8

Production notes:

- Bob Bollard – producer
- Orchestra and chorus directed by Howard Roberts
- Harry Belafonte – liner notes
- Bob Simpson – engineer
- Ed Begley – tape mastering
- Roy De Carava – cover photo

== Chart positions ==
Year	Chart	Position
1963	Billboard Top LPs	30
