= The Many Moods of Belafonte =

Studio album by Harry Belafonte
- Released: 1962
- Genre: Vocal, folk
- Label: RCA Victor
- Producer: Bob Bollard

Harry Belafonte chronology
Midnight Special (1962)	The Many Moods of Belafonte (1962)	Streets I Have Walked (1963)

Professional ratings
Review scores
Source	Rating
Allmusic	4/5 stars

The Many Moods of Belafonte is an album by Harry Belafonte, released by RCA Victor (LSP-2574) in 1962. The album features performances by South African trumpeter Hugh Masekela and vocalist Miriam Makeba.

== Track listing ==
1. "Tongue Tie Baby" (William Eaton) – 3:21
2. "Who's Gonna Be Your Man" (Fred Brooks) – 3:42
3. "'Long About Now" (Fred Hellerman, Fran Minkoff) – 3:55
4. "Bamotsweri" – 2:33
5. "I'm On My Way to Saturday" (Margo Guryan) – 2:45
6. "Betty an' Dupree" – 5:19
7. "Summertime Love" (Frank Loesser) – 3:58
8. "Lyla, Lyla" (M. Zeira, N. Alterman) – 3:26
9. "Zombie Jamboree" (Traditional) – 3:35
10. "Try To Remember" (Tom Jones, Harvey Schmidt) – 3:24
11. "Dark as a Dungeon" (Merle Travis) – 4:15

== Personnel ==
- Harry Belafonte – vocals
- Miriam Makeba – vocals on "Bamotsweri"
- Ernie Calabria – guitar
- Millard Thomas – guitar
- Jay Berliner – guitar
- Hugh Masekela – trumpet
- John Cartwright – bass
- Norman Keenan – bass
- Bill Salter – bass
- Percy Brice – drums
- Ralph MacDonald – percussion
- Auchee Lee – percussion
- Danny Barrajanos – percussion
- Julio Collazo – percussion

Production notes:

- Bob Bollard – producer
- Orchestra conducted by William Eaton
- William Eaton – leader
- Bob Simpson – engineer
- Ed Begley – mastering
- Peter Perri – cover photo

== Chart positions ==
Year	Chart	Position
1962	The Billboard 200	25
