= Cortelia Clark =

American blues singer and guitarist

- Born: c. 1906; Chicago, Illinois, U.S.
- Died: December 24, 1969 (age c. 63) Nashville, Tennessee, U.S.
- Genres: Blues
- Occupations: Musician; songwriter
- Instrument: Guitar
- Years active: c. 1955–1969

Cortelia Clark (c. 1906 – December 24, 1969) was an American blues singer and guitarist, known for his performances on the streets of Nashville. He won a Grammy Award for Best Folk Recording in 1967, for the album Blues in the Street, his only recording.

== Life and recordings ==
Clark was born around 1906 in Chicago. Sources give differing details over his loss of sight. Some state that he was blind from birth and from the age of 11 attended a school for the blind in Nashville, before starting to play and sing blues songs on street corners in the mid-1940s. Others state that he lost his sight after an operation in the mid-1950s. As well as performing on the street, he also sold shopping bags, on 5th Avenue between Church and Union Streets and at other locations.

Around 1964, Mike Weesner, a student at Peabody College, made a demo tape of Clark at Globe Studio. This came to the attention of Bob Ferguson and Chet Atkins of RCA Nashville. Felton Jarvis, Elvis Presley's producer, was enlisted to produce the album. In December 1965, Weesner and Jarvis persuaded RCA to record Clark on the sidewalk, complete with prominently featured (but overdubbed) street noises and interactions with city dwellers. Clark performed original songs and variations of familiar pop, country and blues songs, including the Everly Brothers' hit "Bye Bye Love", Blind Boy Fuller's "Truckin' My Blues Away", and "Walk Right In" as popularised by the Rooftop Singers.

Despite the record selling fewer than 1,000 copies, Jarvis submitted it to the Recording Academy in the Folk category for 1966 record releases, which it won (other nominees included Ravi Shankar; Peter, Paul and Mary; and Pete Seeger). However, the success had little impact on Clark, who continued to perform on the streets and was never recorded again. He died in 1969 in a house fire in Nashville, after his kerosene heater exploded.

== Tributes ==
In 1973 the singer-songwriter Mickey Newbury wrote and recorded a song, "Cortelia Clark", based on his knowledge of the real Clark, on the album Heaven Help the Child. A live version was issued on Newbury's 1988 album In a New Age. Newbury said, "In Nashville...there was an old man there I used to go in and listen to all the time...he was really a great old guy.... I was in San Francisco... I got back home, picked up all of newspapers and went inside, started reading through them. Found out he had burned to death in his trailer while I was gone. I don't know how much it will mean ever to him, but this is a song I wrote about him." The song has subsequently been recorded by other artists, including The Kingston Trio and Josh White Jr., who released an album of the same title in 2000.

== Discography ==
- Blues in the Street, RCA R172587, July 1966; reissued by Collector's Choice Music, 2004
