= The Music Never Stopped =

The Music Never Stopped may refer to:

- "The Music Never Stopped" (song), by the rock band the Grateful Dead, from their album Blues for Allah (1975)
- The Music Never Stopped (album) by the Grateful Dead (2025)
- The Music Never Stopped: Roots of the Grateful Dead, an album of songs that were later covered by the Grateful Dead (1995)
- The Music Never Stopped (film), directed by Jim Kohlberg (2011)
- The Music Never Stopped: Music from the Motion Picture, the soundtrack album for the film (2011)

== See also ==
- The Music Never Stops, an album by jazz singer Betty Carter (2019)
