= African Beat =

African Beat may refer to:

- The African Beat, a 1962 jazz album released by Art Blakey and The Afro-Drum Ensemble
- African Beats, King Sunny Adé's band
- "Afrikaan Beat", a song recorded in 1962 by Bert Kaempfert
