= The Belafonte Folk Singers =

Grammy-winning vocal group created as backing for Harry Belafonte

The Belafonte Folk Singers (originally known as The Belafonte Singers) were a vocal group who were active from 1957 to 1965. They were named after singer Harry Belafonte, for whom they originally formed in order to serve as a backing group for recording and concerts. The group was mostly led and conducted by Robert De Cormier, also billed as Bob Corman. Milt Okun sometimes conducted the group as well.

The Belafonte Folk Singers usually consisted of 11-12 singers and musicians at one time, all male. Its members were mostly African American, although the group did include some white members. The group had a high turnover, and around 40 singers were a part of the group at one time or another during its eight-year existence. Garrett Morris performed with the group early in his career.

The group released three of their own albums for RCA Victor, and sang backup on five albums by Harry Belafonte and Miriam Makeba.

Alumni of The Belafonte Folk Singers went on to form the De Cormier Singers, The Phoenix Singers and the Seafarers Chorus.

== Members ==
Members of The Belafonte Folk Singers included Earl Baker, Kenneth Bates, Harry Bessinger, Laurence Bogue, Ray Boguslav, Charles Coleman, Tim Conn, Joseph Crawford, Leslie Dorsey, James Eby, Jack Eddleman, Ken Emery, Cortez Franklin, Andrew Frierson, Scott Gibson, Joli Gonsalves, George Goodman, Milton Grayson, Bob Harter, Tom Head, Robert Henson, James Herald, Noah Hopkins, Garrett Morris, John Nielsen, Milt Okun, Richard Pindle, Walter Raim, Earl Rogers, Glenn Rowen, Charles H. Scott Jr., Sherman Sneed, Arman Stephanian, Billy Stewart, Millard Thomas, Roy Thompson, Paul Westbrook, John Wheeler, Arthur Williams and Ned Wright.

== Awards ==
The Belafonte Folk Singers won the Grammy Award for Best Folk Recording at the 4th Annual Grammy Awards for their 1961 album Belafonte Folk Singers at Home and Abroad. Two other albums on which they appeared won the same award: the 1960 Harry Belafonte album Swing Dat Hammer and the 1965 album An Evening with Belafonte/Makeba.

== Discography ==
- Presenting The Belafonte Singers, 1958 (as "The Belafonte Singers")
- Cheers: Drinking Songs Around the World, 1959
- ...At Home and Abroad, 1961

=== With Harry Belafonte ===
- My Lord What a Mornin', 1960
- Swing Dat Hammer, 1960
- Belafonte Returns to Carnegie Hall, 1960

=== With Miriam Makeba ===
- Miriam Makeba, 1960
- The World of Miriam Makeba, 1963

=== With Harry Belafonte and Miriam Makeba ===
- An Evening with Belafonte/Makeba, 1965
