= 2nd Annual Grammy Awards =

1959 US music awards ceremony

- Date: November 29, 1959
- Location: Los Angeles and New York
- Hosted by: Meredith Willson

Television/radio coverage
- Network: NBC

The 2nd Annual Grammy Awards were held on November 29, 1959, at Los Angeles and New York. They recognized musical accomplishments by performers for the year 1959. Hosted by Meredith Willson, this marked the first televised Grammy Award ceremony, and it was aired in episodes as special Sunday Showcase. It was held in the same year as the first Grammy Awards in 1959, and no award ceremony was held in 1960. These awards recognized musical accomplishments by performers for that particular year. Frank Sinatra and Duke Ellington each won three awards.

== Performers ==
- Van Cliburn
- Shelley Berman
- Nat King Cole
- Bobby Darin
- Jimmy Driftwood
- Duke Ellington
- Ella Fitzgerald
- Jonah Jones
- The Kingston Trio
- The Mormon Tabernacle Choir

== Award winners ==
The following awards were given at the 1959 ceremony:

- Record of the Year
  - Bobby Darin for "Mack the Knife"
  - The Browns for "The Three Bells"
  - Andre Previn for "Like Young (Single)"
  - Frank Sinatra for "High Hopes (Single)"
  - Elvis Presley for "A Fool Such As I (Single)"
- Album of the Year
  - Frank Sinatra for Come Dance with Me!
  - Robert Russell Bennett for Victory At Sea, Vol. I
  - Kiril Kondrashin & Van Cliburn for Rachmaninoff Piano Concerto No. 3
  - Henry Mancini for More Music From Peter Gunn
  - Harry Belafonte for Belafonte At Carnegie Hall
- Song of the Year
  - Jimmy Driftwood for "The Battle of New Orleans"
  - Stephen Sondeim & Jule Styne, songwriters (Johnny Mathis) for "Small World"
  - Andre Previn & Paul Francis Webster, songwriters (Andre Previn) for "Like Young"
  - Edith Lindeman & Karl Stutz, songwriters (Perry Como) for "I Know (Single)"
  - Sammy Cahn & Jimmy Van Heusen, songwriters (Frank Sinatra) for "High Hopes (Single)"
- Best New Artist
  - Bobby Darin
  - Edd Byrnes
  - Mavis Rivers
  - Johnny Restivo
  - Mark Murphy

=== Children's ===
- Best Recording for Children
  - Peter Ustinov for Prokofiev: Peter and the Wolf performed by Peter Ustinov & the Philharmonia Orchestra conducted by Herbert von Karajan
  - Mary Martin & Thomas Scherman for "Three To Make Music/Cinderella"
  - Marla Ray for "The Arabian Nights (Album)"
  - Allen Swift for "Popeye's Favorite Sea Chanties (Album)"
  - Franz Allers for "Hansel And Gretel - Original Soundtrack (Album)"

=== Classical ===
- Best Classical Performance - Orchestra
  - Charles Münch (conductor) & the Boston Symphony Orchestra for Debussy: Images for Orchestra
- Best Classical Performance - Vocal Soloist (with or without orchestra)
  - Jussi Björling for Bjoerling in Opera
- Best Classical Performance - Opera Cast or Choral
  - Erich Leinsdorf (conductor), Lisa Della Casa, Rosalind Elias, George London, Roberta Peters, Giorgio Tozzi & the Vienna Philharmonic Orchestra for Mozart: The Marriage of Figaro
- Best Classical Performance - Concerto or Instrumental Soloist (with full orchestral accompaniment)
  - Kiril Kondrashin (conductor), Van Cliburn & the Symphony of the Air Orchestra for Rachmaninoff: Piano Concerto No. 3
- Best Classical Performance - Concerto or Instrumental Soloist (other than full orchestral accompaniment)
  - Arthur Rubinstein for Beethoven: Sonatas No. 21 in C (Waldstein) and No. 18 in E Flat
- Best Classical Performance - Chamber Music (including chamber orchestra)
  - Arthur Rubinstein for Beethoven: Sonatas No. 21 in C (Waldstein) and No. 18 in E Flat

=== Comedy ===
- Best Comedy Performance - Spoken
  - Shelley Berman for Inside Shelley Berman
  - Stan Freberg for Stan Freberg With Original Cast
  - Lenny Bruce for Sick Humor
  - Mort Sahl for Look Forward In Anger
  - Andy Griffith for Hamlet
- Best Comedy Performance - Musical
  - Homer and Jethro for The Battle of Kookamonga
  - Bernie Green And The Stereo Madmen for Musically Mad
  - Alice Pearce & Hans Conreid for Monster Rally
  - Cliff Arquette for Charlie Weaver Sings For His People
  - Adolph Green & Betty Comden for A Party With Betty Comden And Adolph Green

=== Composing and arranging ===
- Best Musical Composition First Recorded and Released in 1959 (more than 5 minutes duration)
  - Duke Ellington for Anatomy of a Murder Soundtrack
  - Morton Gould, composer (Morton Gould, conductor) for "St. Lawrence Suite"
  - Dmitri Shostakovich, comopser (Leonard Bernstein, conductor) for Shostakovich: Concerto #2 For Piano And Orchestra, Op. 101 performed by New York Philharmonic
  - Sergei Prokofiev, composer (Jean Martinon, conductor) for Prokoviev: The Overture Russe Op. 72 performed by Paris Conservatoire Orchestra
  - Henry Mancini, composer (Henry Mancini, conductor) for More Music From Peter Gunn
- Best Sound Track Album - Background Score from a Motion Picture or Television
  - Duke Ellington (composer) for Anatomy of a Murder
  - Franz Waxman, composer for The Nun's Story (Motion Picture Album)
  - Stanley Wilson, composer for The Music From M Squad (TV Show) performed by Stanley Wilson
  - Dick Cathcart, composer for Pete Kelly's Blues (TV Show)
  - Henry Mancini, composer for More Music From Peter Gunn (TV Show) performed by Henry Mancini
- Best Arrangement
  - Billy May (arranger) for "Come Dance with Me" performed by Frank Sinatra
  - Robert Russell Bennett (arranger) for Victory At Sea, Vol. I performed by Robert Russell Bennett
  - Esquivel (arranger) for "Strings Aflame" performed by Esquivel
  - Henry Mancini (arranger) for More Music From Peter Gunn (TV Show) performed by Henry Mancini
  - Richard Wess (arranger) for "Mack The Knife" performed by Bobby Darin
  - John Green (arranger) for An Evening With Lerner And Lowe performed by John Green

=== Country ===
- Best Country & Western Performance
  - Johnny Horton for "The Battle of New Orleans"
  - Eddy Arnold for "Tennessee Stud"
  - Skeeter Davis for "Set Him Free"
  - Jim Reeves for "Home"
  - Don Gibson for "Don't Tell Me Your Troubles"

=== Folk ===
- Best Performance - Folk
  - The Kingston Trio for The Kingston Trio at Large
  - Jimmy Driftwood for The Wilderness Road
  - Ralph Hunter for The Wild Wild West
  - Eddy Arnold for Tennessee Stud
  - Harry Belafonte for Belafonte At Carnegie Hall

=== Jazz ===
- Best Jazz Performance - Soloist
  - Ella Fitzgerald for Ella Swings Lightly
  - Red Norvo for Red Norvo In Hi-Fi
  - Andre Previn for Like Young
  - Ruby Braff for Easy Now
  - Bobby Troup for Bobby Troup And His Stars Of Jazz
  - Urbie Green for Best Of New Broadway Show Hits
- Best Jazz Performance - Group
  - Jonah Jones for I Dig Chicks
  - Red Norvo for Red Norvo In Hi-Fi
  - Henry Mancini More Music From Peter Gunn
  - Duke Ellington for Ellington Jazz Party
  - Shorty Rogers for Chances Are It Swings

=== Musical show ===
- Best Broadway Show Album (a tie)
  - Ethel Merman & the original cast for Gypsy
  - The original cast with Gwen Verdon, Richard Kiley, Leonard Stone, Doris Rich, Cynthia Latham, Joy Nichols, Bob Dixon & Pat Ferrier for Redhead
  - Hal Hastings & original cast with Carol Burnett, Joseph Bova, Allen Case, Jack Gilford, & Matt Mattox for "Once Upon A Mattress"
  - John Gielgud for Ages Of Man
  - Betty Comden & Adolph Green for A Party With Betty Comden And Adolph Green
- Best Sound Track Album, Original Cast - Motion Picture or Television
  - André Previn, Ken Darby & the original cast for Porgy and Bess
  - Mario Lanza for For The First Time

=== Packaging and notes ===
- Best Album Cover
  - Robert M. Jones (art director) for Shostakovich: Symphony No. 5 conducted by Howard Mitchell
  - Acy R. Lehman (art director) for Porgy And Bess performed by Lena Horne & Harry Belafonte
  - Acy R. Lehman & Robert L. Yorke (art directors) for The South Shall Rise Again performed by Phil Harris
  - Tom Parker (art director) for For LP Fans Only performed by Elvis Presley
  - Saul Bass (art director) for Anatomy Of A Murder performed by Duke Ellington

=== Pop ===
- Best Vocal Performance, Female
  - Ella Fitzgerald for "But Not for Me"
  - Lena Horne for Porgy And Bess
  - Caterina Valente for "La Strada Del Amore"
  - Pat Suzuki for Broadway '59
  - Peggy Lee for "Alright, Okay, You Win"
- Best Vocal Performance, Male
  - Frank Sinatra for Come Dance with Me!
  - Bobby Darin for "Mack The Knife"
  - Jesse Belvin for "Guess Who"
  - Harry Belafonte for Belafonte At Carnegie Hall
  - Robert Merrill for An Evening With Lerner And Loewe
- Best Performance by a Vocal Group or Chorus
  - Richard P. Condie (choir director) for "The Battle Hymn of the Republic" performed by the Mormon Tabernacle Choir directed by Condie
  - The Browns for "The Three Bells"
  - Robert Shaw Chorale for The Stephen Foster Song Book
  - The Kingston Trio for Kingston Trio At Large
  - The Ames Brothers for Ames Brothers Sing Famous Hits Of Famous Quartets
- Best Performance by a Dance Band
  - Duke Ellington for Anatomy of a Murder
  - Ray Anthony for Sounds Spectacular
  - Perez Prado for Pops And Prado
  - Larry Elgart for New Sounds At The Roosevelt
  - Glenn Miller for For The Very First Time
  - Count Basie for Breakfast Dance And Barbecue
- Best Performance by an Orchestra
  - André Previn & David Rose for Like Young performed by Dave Rose and his Orchestra with André Previn
  - Hugo Winterhalter for Two Sides Of Winterhalter
  - Esquivel for Strings Aflame
  - Stanley Wilson for Music From M Squad
  - Henry Mancini More Music From Peter Gunn
  - Bob Thompson for Just For Kicks
- Best Performance by a "Top 40" Artist
  - Nat "King" Cole for "Midnight Flyer"
  - Neil Sedaka for Neil Sedaka
  - Floyd Robinson for "Makin' Love"
  - The Coasters for "Charlie Brown"
  - Sarah Vaughan for "Broken Hearted Melody"
  - Elvis Presley for "A Big Hunk O' Love"

=== Production and engineering ===
- Best Engineering Contribution - Other Than Classical or Novelty
  - Robert Simpson (engineer) for Belafonte at Carnegie Hall performed by Harry Belafonte
  - Ernest Oelrich (engineer) for Strings Aflame performed by Esquivel
  - Robert Simpson (engineer) for New Sounds At The Roosevelt performed by Larry Elgart
  - Robert Simpson (engineer) for Compulsion To Swing performed by Henry Rene
  - Robert Simpson (engineer) for Big Band Guitar performed by Buddy Morrow
- Best Engineering Contribution - Classical Recording
  - Lewis W. Layton (engineer), Robert Russell Bennett (conductor) & the RCA Victor Symphony Orchestra for Victory at Sea, Vol. I
  - Lewis W. Layton (engineer), Kiril Kondrashin (conductor) for Tchaikovsky: Capriccio Italien, Rimsky-Korsakov: Capriccio Espagnol
  - Lewis W. Layton (engineer), Morton Gould (conductor) for Tchaikovsky: 1812 Overture, Ravel: Bolero
  - Lewis W. Layton (engineer), Fritz Reiner (conductor) for Rossini Overtures
  - Lewis W. Layton (engineer), Morton Gould (conductor) for Doubling In Brass
- Best Engineering Contribution - Novelty Recording
  - Ted Keep (engineer) for "Alvin's Harmonica" performed by David Seville
  - Robert Simpson (engineer) for The Wild Wild West performed by Ralph Hunter Choir
  - Luis P. "Val" Valentin (engineer) for "The Bat" performed by Alvino Rey
  - Robert Simpson (engineer) for Supersonics In Flight performed by Bill Mure
  - Thorne Nogar (engineer) for Orienta performed by Markko Polo Adventures

=== R&B ===
- Best Rhythm & Blues Performance
  - Dinah Washington for "What a Diff'rence a Day Makes"
  - Nat "King" Cole for "Midnight Flyer"
  - Jesse Belvin for "Guess Who"
  - The Coasters for "Charlie Brown"
  - Elvis Presley for "A Big Hunk O' Love"

=== Spoken ===
- Best Performance - Documentary or Spoken Word (other than comedy)
  - Carl Sandburg for A Lincoln Portrait
  - Tony Schwartz for New York Taxi Driver
  - Hal Holbrook for Mark Twain Tonight!
  - Basil Rathbone for Basil Rathbone Reads Sherlock Holmes
  - John Gielgud for Ages Of Man
