= An Evening with Belafonte/Makeba =

Studio album by Miriam Makeba and Harry Belafonte
- Released: 1965
- Studios: RCA Victor Studio A, New York City
- Genre: World music
- Label: RCA Victor
- Producer: Andy Wiswell

Harry Belafonte chronology
Ballads, Blues and Boasters (1964)	An Evening with Belafonte/Makeba (1965)	An Evening with Belafonte/Mouskouri (1966)

Miriam Makeba chronology
Makeba Sings! (1965)	An Evening with Belafonte/Makeba (1965)	The Magic of Makeba (1966)

An Evening with Belafonte/Makeba is a Grammy Award-winning 1965 album by Harry Belafonte and Miriam Makeba, released by RCA Victor. It was one outcome of the long-lasting collaboration between Belafonte and Makeba, which began with the appearance of Makeba in the song "One More Dance" on Belafonte's 1960 album Belafonte Returns to Carnegie Hall.

== Background ==
In the mid-1960s, Belafonte was very active in supporting emerging African artists as well as making African music known worldwide, and this album is an example of this activity. It contains songs in African languages such as Zulu, Sotho and Swahili.

== Overview ==
Despite the title, the album is not a collection of live duet performances by Harry Belafonte and Makeba. It is a studio album of 12 tracks, five by Belafonte, five by Makeba, and two duets. The songs are all African tunes sung in tribal languages like Xhosa and Zulu. The album dealt with the political plight of black South Africans under apartheid, including several songs critical of the South African government, such as "Ndodemnyama we Verwoerd" ("Watch out Verwoerd") by Vuyisile Mini, a reference to Hendrik Verwoerd, one of the architects of apartheid), "Give us Our Land", with lyrics such as "We the black the nation/Are we weeping for our land/Which was taken away from us by white people/Let them return our land", and Makeba's song "Nongqongqo" about political prisoners, which explicitly mentions activists such as Nelson Mandela and Robert Sobukwe. The latter song was later covered by fellow South African singer Letta Mbulu on the 1972 Harry Belafonte album Belafonte...Live! (as "Nonqonqo") and performed by Mbulu in the 1973 Sidney Poitier film A Warm December, but the song's lyrics were not subtitled or explained in any way on the film. The album sold widely and raised Makeba's profile in the US; Belafonte and Makeba's concert tour following its release was often sold out, and the album has been described as the best they made together.

== Chart performance ==
The album debuted on Billboard magazine's Top LP's chart in the issue dated July 10, 1965, peaking at No. 85 during an eleven-week run on the chart. The album debuted on Cashbox magazine's Top 100 Albums chart in the issue also dated July 10, 1965, peaking at No. 87 during a six-week run on the chart.

== Reception ==
Professional ratings
Review scores
Source	Rating
AllMusic	4.5/5 stars
The Encyclopedia of Popular Music	4/5 stars

The Billboard review said, "The artistry of two exciting performers is combined for the first time on record and the result is a remarkable meeting of the musical minds and outstanding musical entertainment."

William Ruhlmann on AllMusic stated, "The real point of this album is to present a group of South African songs in more or less authentic fashion", adding, "This is a powerful album of traditional South African music, and anyone buying it realizing that will be well satisfied."

== Track listing ==
All songs are credited as being traditional except tracks 4, 8, and 9.

1. "Train Song" (Mbombela)– 3:08 (Harry + Miriam, composed by Welcome Duru, credited as traditional)
2. "'In the Land of the Zulus" (Kwazulu) – 2:30 (sung by Miriam Makeba)
3. "Hush, Hush" (Thula Thula) – 3:03 (sung by Harry Belafonte)
4. "To Those We Love" (Nongqongqo)– 2:15 (composed and sung by Miriam Makeba)
5. "Give Us Our Land" – 2:27 (sung by Harry Belafonte)
6. "Ndodemnyama Verwoerd!" – 2:05 (composed by Vuyisile Mini, sung by Miriam Makeba, credited as traditional)
7. "Gone Are My Children" – 2:47 (sung by Harry Belafonte)
8. "Hurry, Mama, Hurry!" – 3:25 (composed by Dorothy Masuka, sung by Miriam Makeba)
9. "My Angel" – 3:12 (composition credited to Fadhili William, sung by Harry + Miriam)
10. "Cannon" – 2:47 (sung by Miriam Makeba)
11. "Lullaby" – 2:46 (sung by Harry Belafonte)
12. "Show Me the Way, My Brother" – 3:10 (sung by Harry Belafonte)

== Personnel ==
- Harry Belafonte – vocals (1, 3, 5, 7, 9, 11, 12)
- Miriam Makeba – vocals (1, 2, 4, 6, 8, 9, 10)
- The Belafonte Folk Singers – vocals (2–8, 10–11) (uncredited)
- Sam Brown – guitar
- Eddie Diehl – guitar
- Marvin Falcon – guitar
- Ernie Calabria – guitar
- Jay Berliner – guitar
- William Salter – bass
- John Cartwright – bass
- Auchee Lee – percussion
- Solomon Ilori – percussion
- Chief Bey – percussion
- Ralph MacDonald – percussion
- Percy Brice – percussion

Production

- Andy Wiswell – producer
- Conducted by Jonas Gwangwa and Howard Roberts
- Arrangements by Jonas Gwangwa
- Harry Belafonte – executive producer, liner notes
- Bob Simpson – engineer

== Charts ==
Chart (1965)	Peak position
US Billboard Top LPs	85
US Cashbox Top 100 Albums	87
