= Jay Berliner =

American guitarist (born 1940)

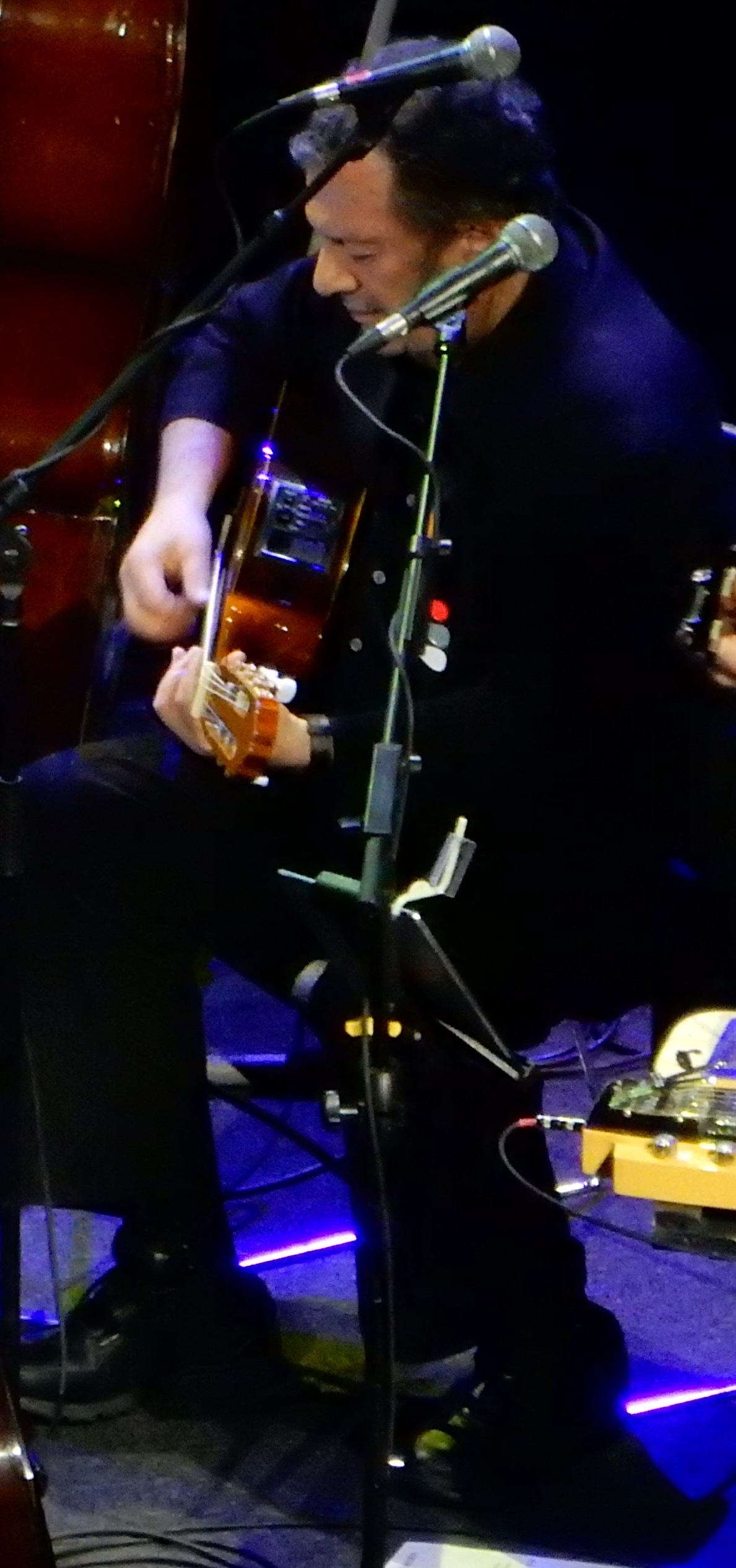
- Berliner performing with Van Morrison in 2019

Background information
- Born: May 24, 1940 (age 86); Brooklyn, New York, US
- Genres: Jazz
- Occupation: Guitarist
- Instrument: Acoustic guitar
- Years active: 1960s—present

Jay Berliner (born May 24, 1940) is an American guitarist who has worked with Harry Belafonte, Ron Carter, Charles Mingus, and Van Morrison, among others.

== Career ==
Berliner had his first television experience at age seven with his sister Eve on The Children's Hour on NBC. He was the guitarist for Harry Belafonte in the early to mid-1960s, appearing on many of Belafonte's recordings and playing in venues around the world. At the Metropolitan Opera house in Manhattan he was house guitarist and mandolinist, toured Japan as a banjo soloist, performed at The White House, and at the Metropolitan Opera with Barbara Cook, Audra McDonald, Josh Groban, and Elaine Stritch, which was recorded live for DRG Records. His solo albums include Bananas Are Not Created Equal, Romantic Guitars, Erotic Guitars, three classical albums for Nippon-Columbia, and three classical albums for Spanish Music Center Records. He can be heard on Romantic Sea of Tranquility under the pseudonym "Chris Valentino."

Berliner began playing as a studio musician in the early 1960s. Since then he has made more than 13,000 recording sessions for records, commercials and films. He has played on albums by Charles Mingus (including The Black Saint and the Sinner Lady) and Ron Carter, George Benson's White Rabbit, Stephane Grappeli's Uptown Dance, Deodato's Also Sprach Zarathustra, and Milt Jackson's Sunflower. He recorded with singers Andrea Bocelli, Debby Boone, Kristin Chenoweth, Perry Como, Harry Connick Jr., Sammy Davis Jr., Blossom Dearie, Sergio Franchi, Astrud Gilberto, Rupert Holmes, Bernadette Peters, Frank Sinatra, Jerry Vale, Frankie Valli, and Russell Watson.

He played on Van Morrison's 1968 album Astral Weeks. In November 2008 he joined Morrison to play Astral Weeks in its entirety at the Hollywood Bowl in Los Angeles, California. A vinyl LP and CD from these concerts entitled Astral Weeks Live at the Hollywood Bowl were released in February 2009.

Berliner is an original member of Rob Fisher's Coffee Club Orchestra on Garrison Keillor's American Radio Company and later at City Center's Encores series. He is also an original member of the Guys All-Star Shoe Band on Garrison Keillor's A Prairie Home Companion. He has performed in concert with William Warfield and Earl Wild at the Lewisohn Stadium, at Town Hall with Andrea Velis, and with Charles Bressler, playing the American premier performance of songs for tenor and guitar by William Walton and Benjamin Britten. In 2009, he played banjo, mandolin, and baritone ukulele onstage in the Broadway show Chicago at the Ambassador Theatre.

== Awards ==
Berliner has won seven NARAS Most Valuable Player awards as well as the NARAS MVP Virtuoso Award in 1986.

== Discography ==
=== As leader ===
- Bananas Are Not Created Equal (Mainstream, 1972)
- The Guitar Session with Gene Bertoncini (Philips, 1977)
- Erotic Guitars (Jonella, 1984)
- Romantic Guitars (Special Music Company, 1987)

=== As sideman ===
With Harry Belafonte

- The Many Moods of Belafonte (RCA Victor, 1962)
- Streets I Have Walked (RCA Victor, 1963)
- Belafonte at The Greek Theatre (RCA Victor, 1963)
- Ballads, Blues and Boasters (RCA Victor 1964)
- An Evening with Belafonte/Makeba (RCA Victor, 1965)
- An Evening with Belafonte/Mouskouri (RCA Victor, 1966)
- Play Me (RCA, 1973)
- Loving You Is Where I Belong (CBS, 1981)

With Ron Carter

- Spanish Blue (CTI, 1975)
- Peg Leg (Milestone, 1978)
- A Song for You (Milestone, 1978)
- New York Slick (Milestone, 1979)
- Empire Jazz (RSO, 1980)

With Cynthia Crane

- Smoky Bar Songs for the No Smoking Section (Lookoutjazz, 1994)
- Blue Rendezvous (Lookoutjazz, 1995)
- Cynthia's in Love (Lookoutjazz, 1997)

With Blossom Dearie

- My New Celebrity Is You (Daffodil, 1976)
- Positively (Daffodil, 1983)
- Songs of Chelsea (Daffodil, 1987)
- Christmas Spice So Very Nice (Daffodil, 1991)
- Tweedledum and Tweedledee (Daffodil, 1991)

With Nellie McKay

- Get Away from Me (Columbia, 2004)
- Pretty Little Head (Hungry Mouse, 2006)
- Normal as Blueberry Pie (Verve, 2009)

With Charles Mingus

- The Black Saint and the Sinner Lady (Impulse!, 1963)
- Mingus Mingus Mingus Mingus Mingus (Impulse!, 1964)

With Van Morrison

- Astral Weeks (Warner Bros., 1968)
- Astral Weeks Live at the Hollywood Bowl (Listen to the Lion, 2009)
- Versatile (Exile/Caroline 2017)
- Three Chords & the Truth (Exile/Caroline, 2019)

With Frank Sinatra

- Watertown (Reprise, 1970)
- Trilogy: Past Present Future (Reprise, 1980)

With others

- Harry Allen, I Can See Forever (BMG, 2002)
- Harry Allen, If Ever You Were Mine (BMG, 2003)
- The Arbors, Featuring: I Can't Quit Her (Date, 1969)
- Burt Bacharach, Futures (A&M, 1977)
- George Benson, White Rabbit (CTI, 1972)
- Leon Bibb, Cherries & Plums (Liberty, 1964)
- Robert Bonfiglio, Romances (High Harmony, 1991)
- Robert Bonfiglio, Live at the Grand Canyon (High Harmony, 1994)
- Don Byron, Don Byron Plays the Music of Mickey Katz (Elektra Nonesuch, 1993)
- Barbara Carroll, From the Beginning (United Artists, 1977)
- James Carter, Chasin' the Gypsy (Atlantic, 2000)
- Jimmy Castor, Maximum Stimulation (Atlantic, 1977)
- Kristin Chenoweth, Let Yourself Go (Sony, 2001)
- Judy Collins, Bread and Roses (Elektra, 1976)
- Judy Collins, Classic Broadway (Platinum 1999)
- Judy Collins, Sings Leonard Cohen (Elektra, 2004)
- Harry Connick Jr., When Harry Met Sally (Columbia, 1989)
- Billy Crawford, Billy Crawford (V2, 1998)
- Cryer & Ford, Cryer & Ford (RCA Victor, 1975)
- Eumir Deodato, Prelude (CBS, 1973)
- Paul Desmond, Summertime (A&M, 1968)
- Trudy Desmond, Make Me Rainbows (Koch, 1995)
- Lou Donaldson, Sophisticated Lou (Blue Note, 1973)
- Charles Earland, Coming to You Live (Columbia, 1980)
- Billy Eckstine, I Am a Singer (Kimbo, 1984)
- Fania All Stars, Spanish Fever (Columbia, 1978)
- Joe Farrell, La Catedral y El Toro (Warner Bros., 1977)
- Sergio Franchi, Wine and Song (RCA Victor, 1968)
- The Free Design, Kites Are Fun (Project 3, 1967)
- The Free Design, You Could Be Born Again (Project 3, 1968)
- The Free Design, Stars/Time/Bubbles/Love (Project 3, 1970)
- James Galway, The Wind Beneath My Wings (RCA Victor, 1991)
- Astrud Gilberto, That Girl from Ipanema (Image, 1977)
- Stephane Grappelli, Uptown Dance (Columbia, 1978)
- Urbie Green, 21 Trombones Rock/Blues/Jazz Volume Two (Project 3 Total Sound, 1969)
- David Hess, Sunshine Path (Diggler, 2005)
- Rupert Holmes, Widescreen (Epic, 1974)
- Dick Hyman, Moog (Command, 1969)
- Solomon Ilori, African High Life (Blue Note, 1963)
- Jackie and Roy, Time & Love (CTI, 1972)
- Milt Jackson, Sunflower (CTI, 1973)
- Grace Jones, Bulletproof Heart (Capitol, 1989)
- Yuki Kajiura, Fiction (Victor, 2003)
- John Kander, Fred Ebb, Chicago the Musical (RCA Victor, 1997)
- Steve Karmen, Reconnecting (Struttin, 1979)
- Morgana King, New Beginnings (Paramount, 1973)
- Ithamara Koorax, Serenade in Blue (Milestone, 2000)
- Ithamara Koorax, All Around the World (Jazz Vision, 2014)
- Ute Lemper, Punishing Kiss (Decca, 2000)
- Jay Leonhart, Two Lane Highways (Kado, 1992)
- Enoch Light, Enoch Light and the Glittering Guitars (Project 3 Total Sound, 1969)
- Enoch Light, Big Hits of the Seventies Vol. 2 (Project 3 Total Sound, 1975)
- Herbie Mann, Glory of Love (A&M, 1967)
- Helen Merrill & Gil Evans, Collaboration (EmArcy, 1988)
- Bette Midler, Bathhouse Betty (Warner Bros., 1998)
- Airto Moreira, Free (CTI, 1972)
- Tony Mottola, Tony Mottola's Guitar Factory (Project)
- Alphonse Mouzon, Leave That Boy Alone! (Vanguard, 1980)
- Laura Nyro, More Than a New Discovery (Verve Folkways, 1966)
- John Pizzarelli, Let's Share Christmas (RCA, 1996)
- Robert Palmer, Ridin' High (EMI, 1992)
- Bernard Purdie, Soul Is... Pretty Purdie (Flying Dutchman, 1972)
- Tim Rose, Tim Rose (CBS, 1967)
- Kevin Rowland, The Wanderer (Mercury, 1988)
- Warren Schatz, Warren Schatz (Columbia, 1971)
- Marlena Shaw, Marlena (Blue Note, 1972)
- Bobby Short, You're the Top (Telarc, 1999)
- Carly Simon, Torch (Warner Bros., 1981)
- Carly Simon, Have You Seen Me Lately (Arista, 1990)
- Luis Spinetta, Only Love Can Sustain (Columbia, 1980)
- Grady Tate, Feeling Life (Skye, 1969)
- Grady Tate, Body & Soul (Milestone, 1993)
- Nino Tempo, Tenor Saxophone (Atlantic, 1990)
- Buddy Terry, Lean on Him (Mainstream, 1972)
- Tom Tom Club, Boom Boom Chi Boom Boom (Fontana, 1988)
- Mary Travers, Morning Glory (Warner Bros., 1972)
- Twinn Connexion, Twinn Connexion (Decca, 1968)
- Stanley Turrentine, Inflation (Elektra, 1980)
- Frankie Valli, Lady Put the Light Out (Private Stock, 1977)
- Grover Washington Jr., Soul Box (Kudu, 1973)
- Russell Watson, Encore (Decca, 2001)
- Cris Williamson, Cris Williamson (Ampex, 1971)
