= Swing Dat Hammer =

Studio album by Harry Belafonte
- Released: 1960
- Recorded: 1960
- Genre: Vocal, folk
- Length: 37:25
- Label: RCA Victor
- Producer: Bob Bollard

Harry Belafonte chronology
Belafonte Returns to Carnegie Hall (1960)	Swing Dat Hammer (1960)	Jump Up Calypso (1961)

Professional ratings
Review scores
Source	Rating
Allmusic	4.5/5 stars

Swing Dat Hammer is an album by Harry Belafonte, released by RCA Victor (LPM/LSP-2194) in 1960. It is a collection of chain gang work songs. The last cut is a collection of workmen conversations.

At the Grammy Awards of 1961 Swing Dat Hammer won the Grammy Award for Best Ethnic or Traditional Folk Recording.

== Reception ==
Billboard put the album in its "Spotlight" section, writing "Belafonte with standout backing from the Belafonte Folk Singers scores effectively on a brace of folk, blues and work songs. His renditions are meaningful and expressive. Stereo sound is good. Fine cover photo of the artist. Set should be a strong seller."

== Track listing ==
1. "Look Over Yonder" – 2:51
2. "Bald Headed Woman" – 3:30
3. "Grizzly Bear" – 3:27
4. "Diamond Joe" (Belafonte) – 3:36
5. "Here Rattler Here" – 3:57
6. "Another Man Done Gone" (Vera Hall, Alan Lomax, John Lomax, Ruby Pickens Tartt) – 2:21
7. "Swing Dat Hammer " – 4:38
8. "Go Down Old Hannah" – 3:47
9. "Rocks and Gravel" – 4:10
10. "Talkin' an' Signifyin' " – 5:08

== Personnel ==
- Harry Belafonte – vocals
- The Belafonte Folk Singers – vocals
- Millard Thomas – guitar
- Robert De Cormier – conductor

== Production notes ==
- Produced by Bob Bollard
- Engineered by Bob Simpson
