= Jump Up Calypso =

Studio album by Harry Belafonte
- Released: 1961
- Recorded: 1960
- Genre: Calypso
- Length: 40:54
- Label: RCA Victor LPM/LSP-2388
- Producer: Bob Bollard

Harry Belafonte chronology
Swing Dat Hammer (1960)	Jump Up Calypso (1961)	Midnight Special (1962)

Professional ratings
Review scores
Source	Rating
Allmusic	4.5/5 stars

Jump Up Calypso is an album by Harry Belafonte, originally released by RCA Victor in 1961. Backing musicians include The Trinidad Steel Band.

== Chart performance ==
It reached number 3 on the Billboard Best Selling Monoraul LP's, during a sixty seven-week run on the chart.

== Reception ==
Music critic Richie Unterberger on AllMusic wrote that the album could be seen as a return to "roots" styles, adding "In any case, it's all-out calypso, with backing by the Trinidad Steel Band, and qualifies as one of his most energetic albums, even getting rambunctious at times."

A UK newspaper, the New Musical Express called it a "top album", and wrote, "An almost forgotten man here, the king of calypso is back, singing the songs he performs best - lively West Indian folk tunes. He makes every one of the 12 tracks a thing of beauty, specially the terrifically rhythmic romp of Jump In The Line, and the soft, sentimental".

== Track listing ==
1. "Sweetheart from Venezuela" (Fitzroy "Lord Melody" Alexander, Bob Gordon) – 3:28
2. "Go Down Emanuel Road" (Irving Burgie) – 3:07
3. "The Baby Boy" (Alexander, Roderick Clavery) – 3:22
4. "Gloria" (Gordon, Clifton "Mighty Bomber" Ryan) – 3:08
5. "Land of the Sea and Sun" (Irving Burgie) – 2:55
6. "Goin' Down Jordan" (Burgie, Theophilus Woods) – 3:34
7. "Jump in the Line" (Aldwyn "Lord Kitchener" Roberts) – 3:39
8. "Kingston Market" (Burgie) – 3:11
9. "Monkey" (Burgie, Norman "King Radio" Span) – 3:58
10. "These Are the Times" (Burgie) – 3:14
11. "Bally Mena" (Burgie, Robert De Cormier) – 3:25
12. "Angelina" (Burgie) – 3:53

== Personnel ==
- Harry Belafonte – vocals
- The Trinidad Steel Band
- Ernie Calabria – guitar, quatro
- Millard Thomas – guitar
- Norman Keenan – bass

== Production notes ==
- Produced by Bob Bollard
- Mastered by Ed Begley
- Arranged by Irving Burgie
- Engineered by Bob Simpson

== See also ==
- Steelpan

== Charts ==
Chart (1961)	Peak position
US Billboard Top LP's (Monoraul)	3
