= Ballads, Blues and Boasters =

Studio album by Harry Belafonte
- Released: 1964
- Recorded: RCA Victor Studio A, New York City
- Genre: Vocal, folk
- Label: RCA Victor
- Producer: Bob Bollard, Priscilla Eaves

Harry Belafonte chronology
Belafonte at The Greek Theatre (1964)	Ballads, Blues and Boasters (1964)	An Evening with Belafonte/Makeba (1965)

Professional ratings
Review scores
Source	Rating
Allmusic	3/5 stars

Ballads, Blues and Boasters is an album by Harry Belafonte, released by RCA Victor in 1964.

== Track listing ==
1. "Tone the Bell Easy" – 3:20
2. "Blue Willow Moan" (Bill Eaton) – 3:35
3. "Ananias" – 2:50
4. "Boy" (G. Tipton, Joe Tinker Lewis) – 3:49
5. "My Love Is a Dewdrop" (Mark Spoelstra) – 3:25
6. "Back of the Bus" – 3:25
7. "Pastures of Plenty" (Woody Guthrie) – 3:38
8. "John the Revelator" (Traditional, Carver Neblett) – 3:41
9. "Four Strong Winds" (Ian Tyson) – 2:54
10. "Black Betty" (Traditional, Kaye Dunham) – 4:14
11. "Big Boat Up the River" – 4:06

== Personnel ==
- Harry Belafonte – vocals
- Ernie Calabria – guitar
- Jay Berliner – guitar
- John Cartwright – bass
- Percy Brice – drums
- Ralph MacDonald – percussion
- Paul Griffin – organ

Production notes:

- Orchestra and chorus conducted by Howard A. Roberts
- Bob Bollard – producer
- Priscilla Eaves – producer
- Bob Simpson – engineer
- Ed Begley – tape mastering
- Peter Perri – cover photo

== Chart positions ==
Year	Chart	Position
1964	Billboard Top LPs	103
