= Skip Weshner =

American radio disk jockey

Theodore Stewart "Skip" Weshner (August 8, 1927 – December 22, 1996) was an American radio disc jockey on stations in New York and Los Angeles from the mid-1950s until the mid-1980s. In particular, he hosted a popular show on KRHM-FM in Los Angeles.

He was born in New York City. He hosted "Accent On Sound" on WBAI (FM) and later WNCN (FM) in New York City from about 1959 through about 1964. There was also about a year during which he broadcast on WRFM (105.1). The biographical info mentions WBFM, but the correct call was WRFM; the program was sponsored by the Electronic Workshop on 8th Street. This was the first "folk music" show heard in New York City. Weshner lived at 18 Jones Street in Greenwich Village. His show was often broadcast from his home studio, built by WNCN Chief Engineer, Martin Gersten. The Clancy Brothers and Hoyt Axton were frequent guests. The show was sponsored regularly by Rudy Bozak and Joe Grado. Blind musician José Feliciano was probably first heard on New York FM radio on Weshner's show. During the first session, Feliciano accidentally fell down the stairs of Weshner's duplex apartment.

Weshner often broadcast from Greenwich Village, including The Bitter End on Bleecker Street and the Cafe Feenjon on MacDougal Street. At the New York Hi-Fi Show at the New Yorker Hotel, c. 1963, Weshner's live broadcast included the then relatively unknown Bob Dylan. Weshner is also remembered for inviting artists such as Gordon Lightfoot and John Denver to his show. He also contributed sleeve notes to Fred Neil's 1965 Elekra folk-rock album, Bleecker & MacDougal.

Weshner was married to Lynne Taylor (1936–1979) of The Rooftop Singers. After the group's hit single "Walk Right In" in early 1963, they moved to California. In Los Angeles in the early 1970s, he had a weekend late-night program on classical station KFAC, and was possibly most famous for his frequent programming of Paraguayan harp music and Caribbean steel drum music. He was also one of the first major station announcers to play what became a standard, bagpipe versions of "Amazing Grace."
