= Belafonte at The Greek Theatre =

Live album by Harry Belafonte
- Released: 1963
- Recorded: August 1963
- Venue: The Greek Theatre, Los Angeles, CA
- Genre: Vocal, folk
- Label: RCA Victor
- Producer: Bob Bollard

Harry Belafonte chronology
Streets I Have Walked (1963)	Belafonte at The Greek Theatre (1963)	Ballads, Blues and Boasters (1964)

Professional ratings
Review scores
Source	Rating
Allmusic	4.5/5 stars

Belafonte at The Greek Theatre is a live double album by Harry Belafonte, released by RCA Victor in 1963. It was his last album to appear in Billboard's Top 40.

== Track listing ==
1. "Look Over Yonder-Be My Woman Gal #1" – 4:42
2. "Glory Manger" – 4:11
3. "Shake That Little Foot" – 4:02
4. "Windin' Road" (William Eaton) – 4:36
5. "Hoedown Blues" – 2:40
6. "Try To Remember" (Tom Jones, Harvey Schmidt) – 3:46
7. "Why'n Why" (Woody Guthrie) – 3:19
8. "Contemporary Dance" – 2:24
9. "In My Father's House" – 3:12
10. "Hayoshevet Baganim" (Nissan Cohen Hav-ron) – 2:30
11. "Cruel War" – 3:23
12. "Pig" – 1:43
13. "Sailor Man" (Fred Hellerman, Fran Minkoff) – 3:03
14. "Merry Minuet" (Sheldon Harnick) – 3:28
15. "Boot Dance" – 3:23
16. "Zombie Jamboree" (Traditional) – 16:45

== Personnel ==
- Harry Belafonte – vocals
- William Eaton – clavietta
- Ernie Calabria – guitar
- Jay Berliner – guitar
- John Cartwright – bass
- Percy Brice – drums
- Ralph MacDonald – percussion

Production notes:

- Orchestra and chorus conducted by Howard Roberts
- Orchestral arrangements by Hugo Montenegro
- Bob Bollard – producer, liner notes
- Bob Simpson – engineer
- Edwin Begley – tape mastering
- Jay Maisel – cover photo
- Garret-Howard – photography
- Wilson Miller – photography

== Chart positions ==
Year	Chart	Position
1964	Billboard Top LPs	17
