= San Lucas Tolimán =

- Municipality of Guatemala
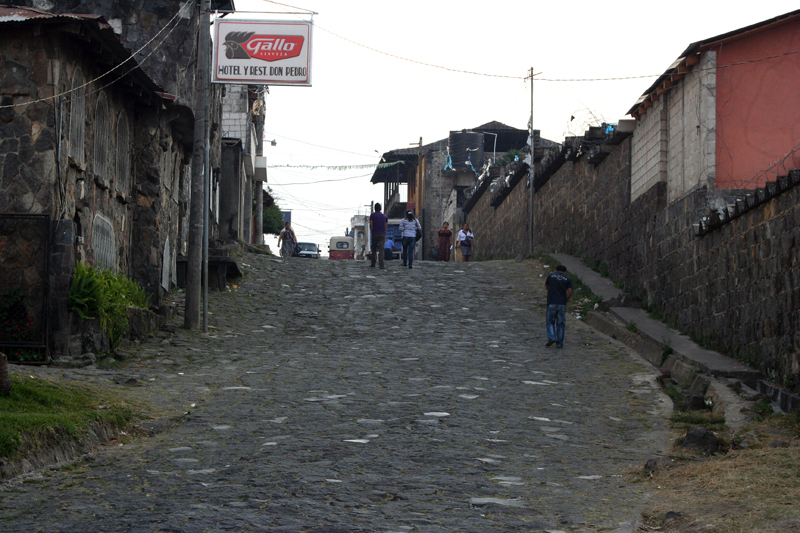
- Street of San Lucas Tolimán

- location in Guatemala
- Coordinates: 14°38′N 91°8′WGNS-enwiki
- Country: Guatemala
- Department: Sololá
- Catholic mission built: 1584

Government
  - Type: municipal
  - Mayor: Moisés Miza Castro (LIDER)
- Elevation: 1,700 m (5,600 ft)
- Highest elevation: 3,144 m (10,315 ft)
- Lowest elevation: 1,562 m (5,125 ft)

Population (2021)
  - Municipality of Guatemala: 31,805
  - Urban: 17,101
- Time zone: UTC-6 (Central Time)
- Country calling code: 502
- Climate: Aw
- Website: www.inforpressca.com/sltoliman

San Lucas Tolimán is a municipality in the Sololá department of Guatemala. The town of 17,000 people sits on the southeastern shore of Lago de Atitlán. The population is 90–95% Highland Maya. There is a population of about the same size living in the surrounding villages.

At 1,700 metres (5,600 ft) altitude the town offers "eternal spring" with annual temperatures ranging from 50 to 80 degrees F. The dry season runs from November through June/July (called "summer" locally) and the rainy season runs the other six months ("winter"). The area is free of malaria due to its elevation. The area's elevation ranges from 1,562 metres (5,125 ft) along the lake to 3,144 metres (10,315 ft) at the summit of Volcán Tolimán. Volcán Tolimán is just west of town.

== History ==
=== Spanish colony ===
After the Spanish conquest of Guatemala, San Lucas Tolimán was part of the Tecpán Atitlán "corregimiento" (English: Province) and when it turned into a major municipality in 1730, it became part of it as well; regarding the Catholic faith, this was in charge of the franciscans, who had convents and doctrines in the area covered by the modern departments of Sacatepéquez, Chimaltenango, Sololá, Quetzaltenango, Totonicapán, Suchitepéquez and Escuintla. The "Provincia del Santísimo Nombre de Jesús" (English:"Province of the most Holy Name of Jesus"), as the Franciscan area was then called, reached up to 24 convents. In 1586, friar Alonso Ponce refers to San Lucas Tolimán as "little town".

Under franciscan tenure, both in the Santiago Atitlán convent town as in the native towns in its annexed doctrines —such as San Lucas Tolimán—, there was religious teaching for 6-year-old girls and older starting at 2:00 pm and for boys of the same age starting at sunset; the class lasted for 2 hours and consisted on memorizing the church teaching and prayers and to make some exercises with the catechism and it was run by a priest or by elder natives, called "fiscales". Adults attended Mass every Sunday and holiday and after mass, there were religious teachings in their own language. Lent was a time of the year when the friars prepared the natives thoroughly, using their own language to accomplish their goals; every Friday of Lent there was a procession following the Rosary steps all the way to the Calvary temple.

In 1754, as part of the borbon reforms, the Franciscans where forced to, give their doctrines to the secular clergy; thus, when archbishop Pedro Cortés y Larraz visited Panajachel in 1770, he described it as a member of the "Santiago Atitlan parish".

=== After independence from Spain ===
The town was elevated to municipality category on 2 September 1877, during the liberal regime of general Justo Rufino Barrios.

=== 20th century: San Lucas Mission ===
The area is well known as being the site of the San Lucas Tolimán Mission, overseen by the Diocese of New Ulm in the city of New Ulm, Minnesota, which is a suffragan see in the Ecclesiastical Province of the Archdiocese of Saint Paul and Minneapolis. The Mission was founded in the 1960s by Monsignor Gregory Thomas Schaffer, who was responsible for starting up a series of education, health, and agriculture initiatives, including the granting of 3 acres of land each to 4,000 families, the launch of medical clinics, and the start of a fair-price coffee initiative. Katie Wallyn, a missionary for the Catholic Church from Minnesota, has been helping the downtrodden there with her foundation L.E.A.S.T, helping the elderly with a loving manner. Monsignor Schaffer encouraged a group of his lay volunteers to found Agua del Pueblo (AdP). AdP is the oldest non governmental organization dedicated to water supply and sanitation in the world. Following the death of Monsignor Schaffer at the age of 78 in St. Paul of a rare form of lymphoma, a new group called the "Friends of San Lucas" has been appointed to continue the work in the area.

=== 21st century ===
On 13 October 2015, the Santiago Atitlán Courthouse issued a warrant for the arrest of the still mayor of San Lucas Tolimán, Oscar Pic Solís, for several charges; municipality secretary, Gaspar Cholotió Hernández, and treasurer, Alberto Cumes Cali were also arrested. Pic Solis had been mayor since 2007, with the Unidad Nacional de la Esperanza party, but he was not re-elected in the 2015 elections.

== Culture ==
=== Music ===
The San Lucas Band were founded in San Lucas Tolimán in 1921, and recorded their album Music of Guatemala there in 1974.

== Territory ==
San Lucas Tolimán has an area of 116 km^{2} and is divided as follows:

San Lucas Tolimán Administrative division
Category	As of 1985	As of 1994
Municipal capital	San Lucas Tolimán	
Villages	Pachitulul; Panimaquip	Panimaquip
Rural settlements	Tzlamabaj	Pachojilá; Pachitulul; Pacoc; La Puerta; San Martín; Tierra Santa; Totolyá; Pampojilá
Micro sections	Pampojilá; Patzibir; Chanán	N/A
Residential neighborhoods	N/A	El Mirador; La Nueva Esperanza

== Climate ==
San Lucas Tolimán has tropical climate (Köppen: Aw).

Climate data for San Lucas Tolimán
Month	Jan	Feb	Mar	Apr	May	Jun	Jul	Aug	Sep	Oct	Nov	Dec	Year
Mean daily maximum °C (°F)	25.5 (77.9)	25.4 (77.7)	26.3 (79.3)	25.7 (78.3)	25.3 (77.5)	23.3 (73.9)	24.4 (75.9)	24.3 (75.7)	23.7 (74.7)	24.0 (75.2)	24.9 (76.8)	24.9 (76.8)	24.8 (76.6)
Daily mean °C (°F)	18.8 (65.8)	18.6 (65.5)	19.5 (67.1)	19.6 (67.3)	19.6 (67.3)	18.9 (66.0)	19.3 (66.7)	19.0 (66.2)	18.7 (65.7)	18.8 (65.8)	18.8 (65.8)	18.3 (64.9)	19.0 (66.2)
Mean daily minimum °C (°F)	12.2 (54.0)	11.9 (53.4)	12.8 (55.0)	13.5 (56.3)	14.0 (57.2)	14.5 (58.1)	14.2 (57.6)	13.8 (56.8)	13.8 (56.8)	13.6 (56.5)	12.8 (55.0)	11.8 (53.2)	13.2 (55.8)
Average precipitation mm (inches)	3 (0.1)	18 (0.7)	16 (0.6)	51 (2.0)	144 (5.7)	387 (15.2)	209 (8.2)	220 (8.7)	388 (15.3)	214 (8.4)	44 (1.7)	10 (0.4)	1,704 (67)
Source: Climate-Data.org

== Geographic location ==
Located 42 km south of department capital, Sololá, Sololá.

== See also ==
- La Aurora International Airport
- List of places in Guatemala

== Notes and references ==
=== Bibliography ===
- Cortés y Larraz, Pedro (2001) [1770]. García, Jesús María; Blasco, Julio Martín (eds.). Descripción Geográfico-Moral de la Diócesis de Goathemala. Corpus Hispanorum de Pace. Segunda Serie (in Spanish). Consejo Superior de Investigaciones Científicas. ISBN 9788400080013. ISSN 0589-8056.
- García Añoveros, Jesús (1989). "Las misiones franciscanas de la Mosquitia nicaragüense" (PDF). Actas del III Congreso Internacional Sobre los Franciscanos en el Nuevo Mundo (Siglo XVII) (in Spanish).
- Juarros, Domingo (1818). Compendio de la historia de la Ciudad de Guatemala (in Spanish). Guatemala: Ignacio Beteta.
- Maudslay, Alfred Percival; Maudslay, Anne Cary (1899). A glimpse at Guatemala, and some notes on the ancient monuments of Central America (PDF). London, UK: John Murray.
- Zetino Boteo, Rony Arceny (2008). "Costos y rentabilidad de unidades agroindustrailes (fabricación de café molido)". Diagóstico socioeconómico, potencialidades productivas y propuestas de inversión, municipio de San Lucas Tolimán, departamento de Sololá (PDF). Ejercicio profesional supervisado (in Spanish). Vol. 18. Guatemala: Facultad de Ciencias Económicas de la Universidad de San Carlos de Guatemala.
