= Barry St. John =

Scottish singer (1943–2020)

- Also known as: Liz Thomson
- Born: Eliza Janet Thomson; November 1943; Gallowgate, Glasgow, Scotland
- Died: 24 July 2020 (aged 76) Hither Green, London, England
- Genres: Pop, R&B
- Occupation: Singer
- Years active: c.1961–1990s
- Labels: Decca, Columbia, Major Minor, Bradley's
- Formerly of: Bobby Patrick's Big Six

Eliza Janet Thomson (November 1943 – 24 July 2020), who recorded as Barry St. John, was a Scottish female singer who had a No. 47 hit in the UK Singles Chart in December 1965 with "Come Away Melinda". It was her only solo chart success.

== Biography ==
Born and raised in Gallowgate, Glasgow, Scotland, Liz Thomson sang from a young age, and joined local beat group, Bobby Patrick's Big Six, before they moved to London in January 1962. The group toured Germany and played clubs in Hamburg, before Thomson decided to start a solo career and returned to England.

As Barry St. John, she signed with Decca Records in 1964 and released her first single, a version of the Jarmels' "A Little Bit of Soap". Her follow-up, a cover version of the Newbeats' hit "Bread and Butter", made the German pop chart later that year. Although she continued to release singles in the UK, they had little success. In 1965, she moved to Columbia Records, and had her only UK Singles Chart entry with "Come Away Melinda", a Weavers song previously recorded by Harry Belafonte which St. John recorded at the suggestion of record producer Mickie Most. Later releases on Columbia were less successful, although several became popular a few years later on the Northern soul scene. In 1968, she recorded further solo singles, on the Major Minor label, and also released an album, According to St. John, produced by Mike Pasternak, alias Emperor Rosko.

She was a member of the Les Humphries Singers between 1972 and 1973, but stayed on as a session singer for the band until 1975. St. John was also a background singer on many records, including T. Rex's Tanx (1973), Pink Floyd's The Dark Side of the Moon (1973), Rick Wakeman's The Six Wives of Henry VIII in the same year, the concept album The Butterfly Ball and the Grasshopper's Feast (1974), and Andy Fairweather Low's, La Booga Rooga (1975). She performed as a session musician for a string of other artists including Alexis Korner, Long John Baldry, and Duster Bennett in the late 1960s, and with Bryan Ferry, Steve Harley & Cockney Rebel and Elton John in the 1970s. Her other project work the following decade encompassed Vivian Stanshall, Kevin Coyne, John Cale, Daevid Allen, Tom Robinson and Whitesnake. Her work continued into the early 1990s with Squeeze and Jorge Ben Jor.

She died in July 2020, in London, England, at the age of 76.

== Discography ==
=== Singles ===
- "A Little Bit of Soap" / "Thing of the Past" (Decca, 1964)
- "Bread and Butter" / "Cry to Me" (Decca, 1964)
- "Mind How You Go" / "Don't You Feel Proud" (Decca, 1965)
- "Hey Boy" / "I've Been Crying" (Decca, 1965)
- "Come Away Melinda" / "Gotta Brand New Man" (Columbia, 1965)
- "Everything I Touch Turns To Tears" / "Sounds Like My Baby" (Columbia, 1966)
- "Cry Like a Baby" / "Long and Lonely Night" (Major Minor, 1968)
- "By The Time I Get To Phoenix" / "Turn on Your Light" (Major Minor, 1969)

=== Albums ===
- According to St. John (Major Minor, 1968)
