= My Lord What a Mornin' =

Studio album by Harry Belafonte
- Released: 1960
- Recorded: 1959
- Studio: RCA Victor, New York City
- Genre: Folk
- Label: RCA Victor
- Producer: Bob Bollard

Harry Belafonte chronology
Porgy and Bess (1959)	My Lord What a Mornin' (1960)	Belafonte Returns to Carnegie Hall (1960)

Professional ratings
Review scores
Source	Rating
Allmusic	3/5 stars

My Lord What a Mornin' is an album of spirituals sung by Harry Belafonte and released by RCA Victor in 1960. The album was reissued in 1995 with additional bonus tracks.

== Track listing ==
1. "Wake up Jacob" (Harry Belafonte, Gene Corman, Milton Okun) – 1:55
2. "My Lord, What a Mornin'" (Belafonte, Corman, Okun) – 4:27
3. "Ezekiel" (Traditional) – 3:41
4. "'Buked and Scorned" (Belafonte, Corman) – 4:45
5. "Stars Shinin' (By 'N By)" (Belafonte, Corman, Okun) – 1:38
6. "Oh, Freedom" (Belafonte, Corman, Okun) – 3:22
7. "Were You There When They Crucified My Lord?" (Traditional) – 4:38
8. "Oh, Let Me Fly" (Belafonte, Corman, Okun) – 2:11
9. "Swing Low" (Traditional) – 4:02
10. "March Down to Jordan" (Belafonte, Okun, Ned Wright) – 3:28
11. "Steal Away" – 3:47
  1995 reissue bonus tracks:
12. "All My Trials" (Traditional, Carter, Greene) – 4:04
13. "Michael Row the Boat Ashore" (Traditional) – 3:59
14. "Go Down Emanuel Road" (Irving Burgie) – 3:12
15. "In My Father's House" – 3:37
16. "Goin' Down Jordan" (Theophilus Woods) – 3:38

== Personnel ==
- Harry Belafonte – vocals
- The Belafonte Folk Singers – vocals

Production notes:

- Bob Bollard – producer
- Conducted by Bob Corman
- Bob Simpson – engineer
- Herschel Levit – cover art
- Langston Hughes – liner notes

== Chart positions ==
Year	Chart	Position
1960	The Billboard 200	34
