= Midnight Special (Harry Belafonte album) =

The Midnight Special

Studio album by Harry Belafonte
- Released: 1962
- Genre: Vocal
- Label: RCA Victor
- Producer: Hugo Montenegro

Harry Belafonte chronology
Jump Up Calypso (1961)	The Midnight Special (1962)	The Many Moods of Belafonte (1962)

Professional ratings
Review scores
Source	Rating
Allmusic	4/5 stars
New Record Mirror	4/5 stars

The Midnight Special is a 1962 album by Jamaican-American singer, Harry Belafonte.

== Chart performance ==
The album peaked at No. 8 on the Billboard Best Selling Monoraul LP's during a twenty four-week run on the chart.

== Background ==
The album notably contains the first officially-released recording by Bob Dylan, who plays harmonica on the title track. For many years the Belafonte session was thought to have been Dylan’s first professional recording, simply because this RCA Victor album was released first. However, in 2001, documentation was found in the RCA Victor vaults along with the session tapes which definitively dates the session as having been recorded at Webster Hall, New York City, in February 1962. This places it later than Dylan's recording session with folksinger Carolyn Hester, which dates from September 1961, also in New York City, although her album was not released until later in 1962.

== Track listing ==
No.	Title	Writer(s)	Length
1.	"Midnight Special"	Traditional	4:02
2.	"Crawdad Song"	Traditional	3:39
3.	"Memphis, Tennessee"	Harry Belafonte	5:00
4.	"Gotta Travel On"	Paul Clayton / Dave Lazar	4:26
5.	"Did You Hear About Jerry"	Harry Belafonte / Irving Burgie	2:57
6.	"On Top of Old Smokey"	Traditional	6:01
7.	"Muleskinner"	Traditional	3:34
8.	"Makes a Long Time Man Feel Bad"	Traditional	5:47
9.	"Michael, Row the Boat Ashore"	Traditional	3:55

== Critical reception ==
Pig River Records praised "The Midnight Special" on its 50th anniversary giving it 8.1/10.

== Personnel ==
- Harry Belafonte – vocals
- Ernie Calabria – guitar
- Millard Thomas – guitar
- Norman Keenan – bass
- Percy Brice – drums
- Danny Barrajanos – drums
- Don Lamond – drums
- Joe Wilder – trumpet solo
- Jerome Richardson – saxophone
- Bob Dylan – harmonica on track 1

Production notes:

- Hugo Montenegro – producer
- Conducted and arranged by Jimmy Jones
- Bob Simpson – engineer, mastering
- Peter Perri – cover photo
- Bob Bollard – liner notes

== Charts ==
Chart (1962)	Peak position
US Billboard Best Selling Monoraul LP's	8
