= African High Life =

Studio album by Solomon Ilori
- Released: 1963
- Recorded: April 25, 1963
- Studios: Van Gelder Studio, Englewoood Cliffs, NJ
- Genres: Highlife, Afro-Cuban jazz, hard bop
- Length: 35:05
- Label: Blue Note
- Producer: Alfred Lion

African High Life is the debut album by Nigerian drummer and percussionist Solomon Ilori, recorded in 1963 and released on the Blue Note label. The album was reissued on CD in 2006 with three bonus tracks recorded at a later session.

== Reception ==
Allmusic awarded the album 4 stars, and reviewer Brandon Burke stated, "This is a very enjoyable if not essential album of traditional African highlife music set to dance tempos". The All About Jazz review by Chris May called the original album "pleasant, if unspectacular, palm-wine highlife outings from the West African tradition, distinguished by some masterful drumming, but diminished by strangely inept alto saxophone contributions" but stated the bonus tracks "anticipate—with great brio and deep grooves—the astral jazz of the late '60s and early '70s, and the world jazz which has in turn followed".

Professional ratings
Review scores
Source	Rating
Allmusic	4/5 stars

== Track listing ==
All compositions by Solomon Ilori

1. "Tolani (African Love Song)" – 7:44
2. "Ise Oluwa (God's Work Is Indestructible)" – 5:39
3. "Follow Me to Africa" – 5:29
4. "Yaba E (Farewell)" – 5:30
5. "Jojolo (Look at This Beautiful Girl)" – 7:17
6. "Aiye Le (The Troubled World)" – 3:25
7. "Gbogbo Omo Ibile (Going Home)" – 11:47 Bonus track on CD reissue
8. "Agbamurero (Rhino)" – 13:54 Bonus track on CD reissue
9. "Igbesi Aiye (Song of Praise to God)" – 13:22 Bonus track on CD reissue

Notes

- Recorded at Van Gelder Studio, Englewood Cliffs, New Jersey on April 25, 1963 (tracks 1–6) and October 30, 1964 (tracks 7–9)

== Personnel ==
- Solomon Ilori – vocal, pennywhistle, talking drum, guitar
- Chief Bey, Roger Sanders (tracks 7–9), Ladji Camara (tracks 7–9), Sonny Morgan (tracks 7–9) – conga, hand drum, percussion
- Josiah Ilori – sakara drum, cowbell (tracks 1–6)
- Robert Crowder – conga, shekere, cowbell (tracks 1–6)
- Montego Joe – conga (tracks 1–6)
- Garvin Masseaux – conga, xylophone, cowbell (tracks 1–6)
- Jay Berliner – guitar (tracks 1–6)
- Hosea Taylor – alto saxophone, flute (tracks 1–6)
- Donald Byrd – trumpet (tracks 7–9)
- Hubert Laws – tenor saxophone, flute (tracks 7–9)
- Elvin Jones – drums (tracks 7–9)
- Ahmed Abdul-Malik (tracks 1–6), Bob Cranshaw (tracks 7–9) – bass
- Coleridge-Taylor Perkinson – piano, musical director
