= Like Young =

Single by André Previn and David Rose

from the album Secret Songs for Young Lovers
- B-side: "Young Man's Lament"
- Released: May 1959
- Genre: Instrumental
- Length: 3:11
- Label: MGM
- Songwriter: André Previn

"Like Young" is a song written by André Previn with lyrics by Paul Francis Webster. An instrumental version by Previn and David Rose appeared on the album Like Young - Secret Songs For Young Lovers.

== Chart performance ==
The Previn version peaked at #46 on the Billboard Hot 100 on the week of July 25, 1959. At the 2nd Annual Grammy Awards on November 29, 1959, "Like Young" won for Best Performance by an Orchestra and was a nominee for Song of the Year, Record of the Year, and Best Jazz Performance – Soloist.
