= The Phoenix Singers =

The Phoenix Singers were a trio of male African-American folk singers active in the early 1960s. The members Ned Wright, Arthur Williams, and Roy Thompson were all former members of The Belafonte Folk Singers.

The trio was the musical guest on the first broadcast of The Tonight Show with Johnny Carson, October 1, 1962.

Carson wrote the liner notes for their first record album, The Phoenix Singers, issued by Warner Bros., WB1485, 1962. Vocal arrangements and musical direction for this album was by Milt Okun. Okun called The Phoenix Singers “one of my failure groups.” (Along the Cherry Lane, 2011, page 106.)

Their second and only other album, Warner Bros. WB1522, was recorded live at The Shadows (later The Cellar Door), Georgetown, Washington, D.C., entitled The Phoenix Singers in Concert. The Phoenix Singers also appeared on at episodes of the TV show Hootenanny, as well as the Today show.

A few recordings from their albums have been added to YouTube.

== The singers ==
=== Roy Thompson (Leroy B. Thompson) ===
Bass. Member of The Belafonte Folk Singers, the Phoenix Singers and the Seafarers Chorus. Born in Jamaica. Roy was a Phi Beta Kappa graduate from the City College of New York and went to Italy on a Buitoni Music Scholarship. As soloist with The Jubilee Singers, he toured Europe, Asia and North Africa under U.S. Sponsorship. Broadway audiences saw him in "To Late the Phalarope", "Carmen Jones", "Show Boat" and "Jamaica". Thompson wrote, arranged and recorded an album called "Ambassador of Calypso" (Request RLP8029). In early 1959, he joined the vocal quartet accompanying Harry Belafonte on his national tour.

=== Arthur Williams ===
Tenor/Baritone. From South Bend, Indiana. Attended Indiana University and the Juilliard School of Music, and was a winner of the National Negro Musicians Award. Williams appeared with Louis Armstrong on The Bell Telephone Hour and as a soloist with the Juilliard Orchestra and Chorus in the Mozart Requiem. He numbered among his credits Broadway appearances in "Show Boat", Carmen Jones", "Finian's Rainbow" and "Porgy and Bess". Member of The Belafonte Folk Singers and The Phoenix Singers. Appeared with Belafonte on many concerts over the years, notably heard as background voice in "Try To Remember".

=== Ned Wright ===
Tenor. Born in Ohio, educated at Oberlin College and the Juilliard School of Music. Wright studied religious music but made his Broadway debut singing with Katherine Dunham. Later he sang with the Metropolitan Opera Chorus and the Robert Shaw Chorale. Has also appeared in "Annie Get Your Gun" and "Finian's Rainbow" and on Broadway he was featured in "My Darlin' Aida" and "Four Saints in Three Acts". The latter was sent to Paris to represent the US at the World Congress of Music around 1960. As Robbins in "Porgy and Bess" he toured the United States, South America, Russia, 31 countries and five continents. In 1957 Wright joined Harry Belafonte and appeared with him at the Palace, on the Steve Allen Show, The Bell Telephone Hour and "Tonight with Belafonte". In the off-Broadway show "Simply Heavenly" he created the role of Watermelon Joe and also played it on Television's "Play of the Week". He also appeared in the film "Odds Against Tomorrow". Member of The Phoenix Singers and The Seafarers Chorus. Vocals on Harry Belafonte's recordings of "Judy Drownded", "Lead Man Holler", "Love Love Alone", "Lucy's Door"

== The albums ==
=== The Phoenix Singers "Warner Bros WB-1485" ===
1. I'm the Man That Built the Bridges
2. Lovely Choucoune
3. Wicked Race
4. Take Matty and Go
5. Cotton Picking Song
6. Wave to Me My Lady
7. Little Rosie
8. Song of the Land
9. Run Come See
10. The Jolly Swagman
11. Unclouded Day
12. Didn't It Rain

=== The Phoenix Singers in Concert "Warner Bros WB-1522" ===
1. Music Train
2. Oh Waly, Waly
3. Joe Magaroc
4. There Was A Time
5. Lead Man Digger
6. By & By / When the Morning Comes
7. Hobo's Lullaby
8. Ole Gator
9. Diamonds of Dew
10. Pocoman
11. Goodnight Irene
