= Erik Darling =

American folk singer-songwriter (1933–2008)

- Born: September 25, 1933; Baltimore, Maryland, U.S.
- Died: August 3, 2008 (aged 74) Chapel Hill, North Carolina, U.S.
- Genres: Folk
- Occupation: Singer-songwriter
- Instruments: guitar, banjo
- Labels: Vanguard; Elektra; Wind River
- Spouse: Joan Darling (divorced)

Erik Darling (September 25, 1933 – August 3, 2008) was an American singer-songwriter and a folk music artist. He was an important influence on the folk scene in the late 1950s and early 1960s.

== Biography ==
Darling was born in Baltimore, Maryland. He entered New York University in the early 1950s, but soon abandoned higher education. Inspired by the folk music group The Weavers, in the 1950s, he formed The Tunetellers, which evolved into The Tarriers with actor/singer Alan Arkin. Their version of the "Banana Boat Song" reached No. 4 on the Billboard chart.

In April 1958, Darling replaced Pete Seeger in The Weavers, and he continued working club dates with The Tarriers until November 1959. Darling also recorded three solo albums. His second solo effort, True Religion, for Vanguard in 1961 was influential on younger folkies of the day. In 1956, he accompanied the Kossoy Sisters on their album Bowling Green. Additional instrumental work is featured on Banjo Music of the Southern Appalachians (Olympic Records, undated, with Darling's first name misspelled as Eric on the album cover).

Darling left the Weavers in June 1962 to work as a soloist on the emerging coffeehouse circuit. That summer he formed the jazz-folk trio The Rooftop Singers with longtime friend Bill Svanoe and jazz singer Lynne Taylor. Intended as a studio-only project for Vanguard, the group landed an unexpected number one pop hit with a cover of Gus Cannon's 1929 song "Walk Right In".

Don McLean, who became friends with Darling in 1961, looked back on Darling as “a genuine philosopher and perfectionist.” He said “I appreciated the time he spent with me so long ago. Undivided mental attention to every aspect of music making and performing is a hallmark of Erik’s work, and I believe some of that rubbed off on me.”

In 1967, Darling and Paul Bennett were co-credited for writing the song "Babe I'm Gonna Leave You," by Quicksilver Messenger Service, which appears to be a medley of Darling's 1958 song "St. John's River" and Joan Baez's recording of "Babe I'm Gonna Leave You", originally written by Anne Bredon..

He died at his home in Chapel Hill, North Carolina, from Burkitt's lymphoma at the age of 74.

== Discography ==
- Camp Songs (with Pete Seeger) (Folkways, 1955)
- Erik Darling (Elektra, 1958)
- Child, Child (Wind River, 2000)
- True Religion And Other Blues, Ballads And Folksongs (Vanguard, 1961)
- Train Time (Vanguard, 1963)
