= Belafonte Returns to Carnegie Hall =

1960 live album by Harry Belafonte

Belafonte Returns To Carnegie Hall

Live album by Harry Belafonte
- Released: November 1960
- Recorded: May 2, 1960
- Length: 71:49
- Label: RCA Victor
- Producer: Bob Bollard

Harry Belafonte chronology
My Lord What a Mornin' (1960)	Belafonte Returns To Carnegie Hall (1960)	Swing Dat Hammer (1960)

Professional ratings
Review scores
Source	Rating
Allmusic	link

Belafonte Returns to Carnegie Hall is a live double album by Harry Belafonte. It is the second of two Belafonte Carnegie Hall albums, and was recorded May 2, 1960. It peaked at No. 3 on the Billboard Pop albums charts.

Belafonte shares the stage in this live recording with The Belafonte Folk Singers, Odetta, The Chad Mitchell Trio and Miriam Makeba.

== Reception ==
Billboard put it in its "Spotlight Winner's of the Week", writing "This second Belafonte Carnegie set has the added lure of two of the top current names on the folk scene in Odetta and Makeba, and even tho each gets only two chances in the set, these outings are gems. Belafonte himself is featured with both upon occasion as well as with his own group. Chad Mitchell's folk group also impresses. A lot of excitement here-for listeners and dealers, in a solid two-LP set."

== Track listing ==
1. "Jump Down Spin Around" - Harry Belafonte and the Belafonte Folk Singers - 2:14
2. "Suzanne" - Harry Belafonte - 5:50
3. "A Little Lyric of Great Importance" - Harry Belafonte and the Belafonte Folk Singers - 1:29
4. "Chickens" - Harry Belafonte and the Belafonte Folk Singers - 3:10
5. "Vaichazkem" - The Chad Mitchell Trio - 1:34
6. "I Do Adore Her" - The Chad Mitchell Trio - 3:18
7. "The Ballad of Sigmund Freud" - The Chad Mitchell Trio - 3:28
8. "I've Been Driving On Bald Mountain/Water Boy" - Odetta - 6:54
9. "A Hole in the Bucket" - Harry Belafonte and Odetta - 5:19
10. "The Click Song" - Miriam Makeba and The Belafonte Folk Singers - 3:46
11. "One More Dance" - Harry Belafonte and Miriam Makeba - 3:43
12. "The Ox Drivers" - Belafonte Folk Singers - 2:59
13. "The Red Rosy Bush" - Belafonte Folk Singers - 2:51
14. "Didn't It Rain" - Belafonte Folk Singers - 5:27
15. "Hene Ma Tov" - Harry Belafonte and the Belafonte Folk Singers - 3:46
16. "I Know Where I'm Going" - Harry Belafonte and the Belafonte Folk Singers - 3:27
17. "Old King Cole" - Harry Belafonte and the Belafonte Folk Singers - 4:59
18. "La Bamba" - Harry Belafonte and the Belafonte Folk Singers - 8:04

The RCA Victor compact disc reissue (09026-62690-2) of this album contains alternate performances of the songs "Jump Down, Spin Around", "Hené Ma Tov", "I Know Where I'm Going" and "La Bamba".

== Personnel ==
- Harry Belafonte – vocals
- The Belafonte Folk Singers – vocals
- Chad Mitchell Trio – vocals
- Odetta – vocals
- Miriam Makeba – vocals
- Danny Barrajanos – bongos, conga
- Ernie Calabria – guitar
- Walter Raim – guitar
- Millard Thomas – guitar
- Robert De Cormier – conductor
- Milton Okun – conductor

== Production notes ==
- Bob Bollard – producer, liner notes
- John Pfeiffer – reissue producer
- Bob Simpson – engineer
- Digital Remastering by Nate Johnson and Thomas MacCluskey
- Photography by Roy DeCarava, Peter Perri and Jay Maisel

== Charts ==
Chart (1960)	Peak position
US Billboard Best Selling Monoraul LP's	3
