= Come Away Melinda =

1963 song

"Come Away Melinda" is a song written by Fred Hellerman and Fran Minkoff. An anti-war song, its first release was by Harry Belafonte in May 1963. The same year, The Big 3 - a folk group featuring Cass Elliot, later of The Mamas and Papas, - recorded the song for their first album. The song was subsequently recorded by many other singers.

== Recordings ==
The song was first released by Harry Belafonte in May 1963, as the closing track on his album Streets I Have Walked. It had been performed by The Weavers (including Hellerman) at their 15th anniversary concerts on May 2 and 3, 1963, which were issued later that year as Reunion At Carnegie Hall, 1963.

Later recordings include those by Judy Collins (Judy Collins 3), Theodore Bikel (A Folksinger's Choice), Tim Rose (Tim Rose), Bobbie Gentry (Local Gentry), Uriah Heep (...Very 'Eavy ...Very 'Umble), Velvett Fogg (Velvett Fogg), UFO (UFO 1), Kenny Rankin (Mind-Dusters), The Big 3 (Live at the Recording Studio), John Miles, Cat's Eyes, and L.Stadt.

In the UK it was a number 47 hit for female singer Barry St. John in 1965.
