= The San Lucas Band =

Guatemalan brass band

- Also known as: Conjunto de la Voz de las Cumbres
- Origin: San Lucas Tolimán
- Years active: 1921–?
- Past members: Bernardo Mejia; Guielimo Campo Mendoza; Alejandre Cos Coquix; Manúel Mejia Mucia; Jesús Garcia Hernández; Ermerjildo Cos Murcia; Alberto Camp

The San Lucas Band were a Guatemalan brass band, founded in 1921. Their only album Music of Guatemala was recorded in 1974, released in 1975, and nominated for the Grammy Award for Best Ethnic or Traditional Folk Recording in 1976.

== History ==
The San Lucas Band, also known as the Conjunto de la Voz de las Cumbres, were a brass band from San Lucas Tolimán, Guatemala. The band was founded in 1921 by violinist Bernardo Mejia, and by 1974 comprised seven Kaqchikel musicians on violin, cornet, baritone horn, alto saxophone, snare drum, cymbal, and bass drum.

On Good Friday 1972, American ethnomusicologists Linda O'Brien-Rothe and Kathryn King came across the San Lucas Band while travelling in Santiago Atitlán. They organised a recording session for the band in 1974, which was released in 1975 by ABC Records as Music of Guatemala, the San Lucas Band's only album. The album was one of the three inaugural releases in the "Music of the Earth" series that ABC Records started in 1975, alongside Music of Chile and Music of Sikkim.

The first half of Music of Guatemala is funeral dirges, of which David Hamilton of The Nation wrote: "The players' ideas of the music are evidently far removed from those of the now unidentifiable composers, and they have made something very weird and individual out of originals that can be still dimly perceived." The second half is Guatemalan popular music and Mexican rancheras. Music of Guatemala was nominated for the Grammy Award for Best Ethnic or Traditional Folk Recording in 1976, losing to The Muddy Waters Woodstock Album. It sold poorly but has since gained underground acclaim among many generations of listeners, including Jon Hassell, Charlie Haden, and John Zorn, who all claimed it to be one of their favorite records.

In 2024 the album was reissued by Bongo Joe Records with the title La Voz de las Cumbres (Music of Guatemala).

The members of the San Lucas Band were apparently displaced by the Guatemalan Civil War, and their whereabouts are unknown.

== Musical style ==
The music of the San Lucas Band is considered avant-garde. David Toop of The Wire described it as "Albert Ayler on Temazepam." Also in The Wire, Richard Scott described the band's sound as "mutant brass...strangely beautiful massacres of Spanish imperial music." Richard Dyer of The Boston Globe described Music of Guatemala as sounding "quite weird, at points, quite affecting, at others, well, indescribable."

== Discography ==
Albums

- Music of Guatemala (1975, ABC Records), reissued in 2024 by Bongo Joe Records.
