= The African Beat =

Studio album by Art Blakey and the Afro-Drum Ensemble
- Released: November 1962
- Recorded: January 24, 1962
- Studio: Van Gelder Studio; Englewood Cliffs
- Genre: Jazz
- Length: 40:15
- Label: Blue Note; BLP 4097
- Producer: Alfred Lion

Art Blakey chronology
Buhaina's Delight (1961)	The African Beat (1962)	Three Blind Mice (1962)

Professional ratings
Review scores
Source	Rating
AllMusic	2.5/5 stars
The Rolling Stone Jazz Record Guide	3/5 stars
The Penguin Guide to Jazz Recordings	3/4 stars

The African Beat is a jazz album by Art Blakey and the Afro-Drum Ensemble recorded for Blue Note on January 24, 1962 and released later that year.

== Background ==
He described it as the first opportunity he had to work with drummers from Africa; as a blend of American jazz with the traditional rhythms and tonal colors in the percussion of that continent. The album features compositions by African and American musicians, all based on aspects of West African (especially Nigerian) music.

== Track listing ==
=== Side 1 ===
1. "Prayer by Solomon G. Ilori" – 0:55
2. "Ife L'ayo (There Is Happiness in Love)" (Solomon G. Ilori) – 5:31
3. "Obirin African (Woman of Africa)" (Garvin Masseaux) – 3:45
4. "Love, The Mystery of" (Guy Warren) – 9:22

=== Side 2 ===
1. "Ero Ti Nr'Ojeje" (Ilori) – 7:33
2. "Ayiko, Ayiko (Welcome, Welcome, My Darling)" (Ilori) – 7:13
3. "Tobi Ilu" (James H. Bey) – 5:56

== Personnel ==
=== The Afro-Drum Ensemble ===
- Art Blakey – drums, timpani, telegraph drum, gong
- Ahmed Abdul-Malik – bass
- Yusef Lateef – cow horn, flute, tenor saxophone, mbira, oboe
- Curtis Fuller – timpani
- Chief Bey – double gong, conga, telegraph drum
- Robert Crowder – Batá drum, conga
- James Ola. Folami – conga
- Solomon G. Ilori – vocals, talking drum, pennywhistle
- Montego Joe – corboro drum, log drum, bambara drum, double gong
- Garvin Masseaux – shekere, African maracas, conga

=== Technical personnel ===
- Alfred Lion – producer
- Rudy Van Gelder – recording engineer
- Reid Miles – design
- Francis Wolff – photography
- Nat Hentoff – liner notes
