= Solomon Ilori =

Nigerian drummer and percussionist (born c. 1934)

- Genres: Highlife
- Occupations: Bandleader, composer, percussionist, choreographer and dancer
- Instruments: African drums, including talking drum, pennywhistle, guitar
- Years active: 1958-present
- Label: Blue Note

Solomon Gbadegesin Ilori (born c. 1934) is a Nigerian drummer and percussionist who moved to New York City in 1958 and collaborated with jazz artists such as Art Blakey and Harry Belafonte before recording his debut album for Blue Note Records in 1963.

== Biography ==
Solomon Gbadegesin Ilori was born to Nigerian parents in the village of Nsawam, Gold Coast (Ghana) in 1934. He moved to Lagos (Nigeria) after his mother died in 1945 in Nigeria. As a child, he learned to play the drums, guitar and flute. He moved to the US in 1958.

== Discography ==
=== As leader ===
- African High Life (Blue Note, 1963)

=== As sideman ===
With Art Blakey

- The African Beat (Blue Note, 1962)
