= Walk Right In =

Single by the Rooftop Singers

from the album Walk Right In
- B-side: "Cool Water"
- Released: December 1962
- Recorded: 1962
- Genre: Folk; folk-pop; novelty
- Length: 2:33
- Label: Vanguard (US); Fontana (UK and Europe); Astor (Australia); His Master's Voice [New Zealand]
- Songwriters: Gus Cannon, Hosea Woods
- Producers: Erik Darling, Bill Svanoe

The Rooftop Singers singles chronology
"Walk Right In" (1962)	"Tom Cat" (1963)

"Walk Right In" is a country blues song written by musician Gus Cannon and originally recorded by Cannon's Jug Stompers in 1929 by RCA Victor. In 1959, it was included on the compilation album The Country Blues. Another version of the song by the Rooftop Singers, with the writing credits allocated to group members Erik Darling and Bill Svanoe, became an international hit in 1963.

== The Rooftop Singers ==
In 1962, the American folk trio the Rooftop Singers recorded a version of the song. Group member Erik Darling recruited two friends to join him in this effort after hearing the original Cannon recording. Darling wanted the track to have a distinctive sound, so he and group member Bill Svanoe both played twelve-string guitars, although they had some difficulty in acquiring the instruments. Darling is quoted as saying that prior to the making of this record, "you couldn't buy a 12-string guitar ... I ordered one from the Gibson Company, but in order to record [the song] with two 12-strings, we had to wait for the company to build a second one for Bill!" (a left-handed model). The success of the song was a boon to Cannon, who was in his late 70s and had been forced to pawn his banjo the previous winter to pay his heating bill; he received royalties as a songwriter and saw renewed interest in his music, which led to a recording contract of his own.

When released as a single, it spent two weeks at No.1 on the Billboard Hot 100 chart in early 1963. It spent five weeks atop the Easy Listening chart, which later became known as the Adult Contemporary chart. In addition, "Walk Right In" reached both the R&B chart (peaking at No.4) as well as the country music chart, peaking at No.23. The song reached No.10 on the UK Singles Chart in the United Kingdom. It was included on their 1963 album Walk Right In, which was nominated for a Grammy Award in the category Best Folk Recording.

== Charts ==
=== Rooftop Singers ===
1962–1963 weekly singles charts
Chart	Peak	Ref(s)
Canada CHUM	1	
UK Singles Chart	10	
US Billboard Hot 100	1	
US Cash Box Top 100	1	

1963 year-end charts
Chart	Rank	Ref(s)
US Billboard Hot 100	34	
US Cash Box Top 100	17	

== Dr. Hook & the Medicine Show ==
In 1977, a version by Dr. Hook & the Medicine Show reached No.46 on Billboard's Hot 100, and No.77 in Canada. For year-end charts, it was ranked No.249 on Joel Whitburn's Pop Annual and No.1 in Australia selling well over 50,000 units in just four weeks of release.

== Certifications ==
Region	Certification	Certified units/sales
Australia (ARIA)	2× Gold	100,000^{^}
^{^} Shipments figures based on certification alone.

== See also ==
- List of Hot 100 number-one singles of 1963 (U.S.)
- List of number-one adult contemporary singles of 1963 (U.S.)
- List of number-one singles in Australia during the 1960s
- Twelve-string guitar – Fretted string instrument optimized for richer sounds
