= The Voice of Africa (Miriam Makeba album) =

Studio album by Miriam Makeba
- Released: 1964
- Studio: RCA Studio A, New York City
- Genre: World music, African music
- Label: RCA Victor
- Producer: Hugo & Luigi

Miriam Makeba chronology
| The World of Miriam Makeba (1963) | The Voice of Africa (1964) | Makeba Sings! (1965) |

Professional ratings
Review scores
| Source | Rating |
|---|---|
| AllMusic | 4.5/5 stars |

The Voice of Africa is the 1964 fourth album by Miriam Makeba, issued by RCA Victor. It charted at No. 122 on the US album chart.

== Track listing ==
1. "Nomthini" (Miriam Makeba, Alan Salinga) 1:51
2. "Willow Song" (Giuseppe Verdi) 2:45
3. "Langa More" (Zeph Nkabinde) 2:20
4. "Shihibolet" 1:49
5. "Tuson" (Julio Perez) 1:58
6. "Qhude" (Miriam Makeba, Hugh Masekela) 2:40
7. "Mayibuye" (Miriam Makeba, Christopher Songxaka) 2:45
8. "Lovely Lies" (Joe Glazer, Mackay Davashe) 2:42
9. "Uyadela" (Miriam Makeba) 2:30
10. "Mamoriri" (Miraim Makeba) 1:40
11. "Le Fleuve" (Stephane Golmann) 2:00
12. "Come to Glory" 2:30

== Personnel ==
- Miriam Makeba - vocals
- Laura Brower, Marvin Falcon, Samuel Brown - guitar
- William Salter - bass guitar
- Auchee Lee - drums, percussion
- Hugh Masekela - trumpet, arranger, conductor
- Morris Goldberg - alto saxophone
- James Cleveland - trombone
