= The Music Never Stopped: Roots of the Grateful Dead =

1995 compilation album by various artists

- Cover art by Robert Crumb

Compilation album by Various Artists
- Released: October 17, 1995
- Genre: Country rock, folk rock, rock, blues
- Length: 52:20
- Label: Shanachie
- Producer: Various

Professional ratings
Review scores
Source	Rating
AllMusic	link
Entertainment Weekly	(A+) link
The Music Box	link
San Francisco Examiner	(not rated) link

The Music Never Stopped: Roots of the Grateful Dead is a 1995 compilation album of songs, performed by the original artists, that the American rock group the Grateful Dead covered and performed live throughout their career. Several of the tracks on this album can be found on no other compact disc, including "Rain and Snow" as performed by Obray Ramsey and "Big Railroad Blues" by Cannon's Jug Stompers. The eclectic nature of the Grateful Dead's music is highlighted on this album with the inclusion of songs from such diverse genres as folk ("Morning Dew", "Goin' Down This Road Feelin' Bad"), the blues ("The Red Rooster", "Turn On Your Love Light"), country ("Mama Tried", "El Paso"), gospel ("Samson & Delilah"), and straight out rock and roll ("The Promised Land", "Not Fade Away").

== Cover and title ==
The cover, drawn by underground cartoonist Robert Crumb, depicts some of the artists appearing on the album performing to skeletal Deadheads.

The title comes from the song "The Music Never Stopped" from the Grateful Dead album Blues for Allah.

== Track listing ==
No.	Title	Original artist	Length
1.	"Rain and Snow"	Obray Ramsey	3:25
2.	"Mama Tried"	Merle Haggard	2:10
3.	"Iko Iko"	Dixie Cups	2:00
4.	"Samson & Delilah"	Rev. Gary Davis	4:03
5.	"Big Railroad Blues"	Cannon's Jug Stompers	3:18
6.	"El Paso"	Marty Robbins	4:20
7.	"It's All Over Now, Baby Blue"	Bob Dylan	4:13
8.	"Spoonful"	Charlie Patton	3:11
9.	"The Red Rooster"	Howlin' Wolf	2:23
10.	"Promised Land"	Chuck Berry	2:26
11.	"Don't Ease Me In"	Henry Thomas	2:59
12.	"Big Boss Man"	Jimmy Reed	2:49
13.	"Turn On Your Love Light"	Bobby "Blue" Bland	2:36
14.	"Morning Dew"	Bonnie Dobson	4:05
15.	"Not Fade Away"	Buddy Holly	2:20
16.	"Goin' Down This Road Feelin' Bad"	Woody Guthrie	2:47
17.	"I Bid You Good Night"	The Pindar Family with Joseph Spence	2:47

== Credits ==
- Produced by Henry Kaiser and David Gans
- Mastered by Paul Stubblebine
- Notes by Blair Jackson
- Front cover design by R. Crumb
- Art direction by Joan Pelosi
