= Makeba Sings! =

Studio album by Miriam Makeba
- Released: 1964
- Studio: RCA Studio B, New York City
- Genre: World music, African music
- Label: RCA Victor
- Producer: Jim Foglesong

Miriam Makeba chronology
The Voice of Africa (1964)	Makeba Sings! (1964)	An Evening with Belafonte/Makeba (1965)

Professional ratings
Review scores
Source	Rating
Allmusic	3/5 stars

Makeba Sings! is the fifth album by Miriam Makeba, released by RCA Victor in 1965. The album charted at number 74 in the US album chart.

== Track listing ==
1. "Cameroon" (Dorothy Masuka, William Salter)
2. "Woza" (Hugh Masekela)
3. "Little Bird" (Carol Hall)
4. "Chove-chuva" (Jorge Ben)
5. "Same Moon" (Millard Thomas, Sondra Martin)
6. "Kilimanjaro" (Mackay Davashe, Tom Glazer)
7. "Khawuyani-Khanyange" (Dorothy Masuka, Miriam Makeba)
8. "Wind Song" (Andrea Jean Saks, William Salter)
9. "Khuluma" (Betty Khoza)
10. "Let's Pretend" (William Salter)
11. "Beau Chevalier" (Stéphane Gollman)
12. "Maduna" (Miriam Makeba, Hugh Masekela)
