= Gus Cannon =

American blues musician (1883–1979)

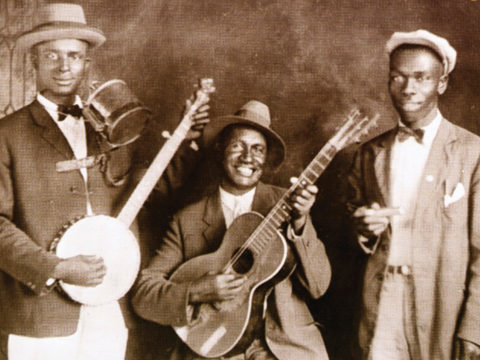
- Cannon (left) with Cannon's Jug Stompers, c. 1928

Background information
- Also known as: Banjo Joe / "Colored Champion Banjo Pugilist"
- Born: Gustavus Cannon; September 12, 1883; Red Banks, Mississippi, U.S.
- Died: October 15, 1979 (aged 96) Memphis, Tennessee, U.S.
- Genre: Folk blues
- Occupation: Musician
- Instruments: Banjo; Jug; Vocals; Fiddle
- Years active: 1898–1940; 1956–1979
- Labels: RCA Victor; Paramount; Stax; Folkways; Brunswick
- Formerly of: Cannon's Jug Stompers

Gustavus "Gus" Cannon (September 12, 1883 – October 15, 1979) was an American blues musician who helped to popularize jug bands (such as his own Cannon's Jug Stompers) in the 1920s and 1930s. There is uncertainty about his birth year; his tombstone gives the date as 1874.

== Career ==
Born on the Henderson Newells Plantation in Red Banks, Mississippi, Cannon's childhood consisted of moves to various plantations throughout the Red Banks-Victoria area. At the age of 12, he moved a hundred miles to Clarksdale, then the home of W. C. Handy, to aid his brother, Tom, sharecrop cotton. His brothers, of which he had nine, exposed Cannon to music. They spent much time singing folksongs and performing traditional string band tunes together, utilizing the fiddle, guitar, and banjo. His musical skills came without training; he taught himself to play a banjo that he made from a frying pan and a raccoon skin. Around this time, Cannon mastered his first down-picking banjo tune name "Old Johnny Booker, Call That Gone". He ran away from home at the age of fifteen and began his career entertaining at sawmills and at levee and railroad camps in the Mississippi Delta around the turn of the twentieth century. This was catalyzed by his brother offering him $10.00 and encouraging him to go out on his own.

While in Clarksdale, Cannon was influenced by two local musicians, Jim Turner and Alec Lee. Turner's fiddle playing in W. C. Handy's band so impressed Cannon that he decided to learn to play the fiddle himself. Lee, a guitarist, taught Cannon his first folk blues, "Po' Boy, Long Ways from Home" and "Can You Blame the Colored Man," and showed him how to use a knife blade as a slide, a technique that Cannon adapted to his banjo playing.

Cannon left Clarksdale around 1907 and soon settled near Memphis, Tennessee, where he sharecropped on Dillehunt's plantation and played in a jug band led by Jim Guffin. He began playing in Memphis with Jim Jackson. During this time, the two musicians were also involved in medicine shows, performing as blackface minstrels. He met the harmonica player Noah Lewis, who introduced him to a young guitar player and blues singers, Ashley Thompson around 1910. Lewis and Thompson later were members of Cannon's Jug Stompers. The three of them formed a band to play at parties and dances. In 1914, Cannon began touring in medicine shows which lasted until 1930. Through this tour, he traveled around the South and Midwest. He supported his family through various jobs, including sharecropping, ditch digging, and yard work, but supplemented his income with music.

Cannon began recording, as Banjo Joe, for Paramount Records in 1927. At that session he was backed by Blind Blake. Overall, from 1927 to 1930, Cannon recorded thirty-four recordings for three different record labels, Paramount, Victor, and Brunswick Records. The recordings consisted of twenty blues and five ragtime-influenced songs, as well as one old-time banjo song, "Feather Bed." As opposed to the down-picking style, much of this music was composed of the three-finger guitar banjo style, also known as classic banjo. By the end of the 1930s, Cannon had effectively retired, although he occasionally performed as a solo musician and provided whistling to music.

Cannon is also acknowledged to have been an early mentor to Johnny Cash after Cash arrived in Memphis in 1954.

Cannon made a few recordings for Folkways Records in 1956. During the blues revival of the 1960s, he made some appearances at colleges and coffee houses with Furry Lewis and Bukka White, but he had to pawn his banjo to pay his heating bill the winter before The Rooftop Singers had a hit with "Walk Right In."

In the wake of becoming a hit composer, he recorded an album for Stax Records in 1963, with fellow Memphis musicians Will Shade (the former leader of the Memphis Jug Band) on jug and Milton Roby on washboard. Cannon performed traditional songs, including "Kill It," "Salty Dog," "Going Around," "The Mountain," "Ol' Hen," "Gonna Raise a Ruckus Tonight," "Ain't Gonna Rain No More," "Boll-Weevil," "Come On down to My House," "Make Me a Pallet on Your Floor," "Get Up in the Morning Soon," and "Crawdad Hole," along with his own "Walk Right In," with stories and introductions between songs.

Cannon appeared in the film Hallelujah! (1929), produced by King Vidor, in the late-night wedding scene.

== Cannon's Jug Stompers ==
The Jug Stompers of Cannon were among the most successful jug bands to come out of Memphis in the late 1920s and helped to popularize jug band music in the early days of recording. After the success of the Memphis Jug Band's first records, he quickly assembled a jug band, Cannon's Jug Stompers, featuring Lewis and Thompson (later replaced by Elijah Avery), incentivized by a request for a Victor Records session. The group was created in January 1928 after a request to have a recording session with Victor Records, where Gus Cannon was requested to lead the band which included harmonic player Noah Lewis and a guitarist, Ashley Thompson. Their initial recording session was at the Memphis Auditorium in January 1928. During this session they recorded four songs, three of them blues and one influenced by ragtime. The initial group also recorded "Walk Right In." Hosea Woods joined the Jug Stompers in the late 1920s, playing guitar, banjo and kazoo and providing some vocals. Cannon's Jug Stompers' recording of "Big Railroad Blues" is available on the compilation album The Music Never Stopped: Roots of the Grateful Dead.

The instrumentation of the ensemble was also typical of the jug band music, and included banjo, guitar, harmonica and jug, and other improvised instruments like kazoo and washboard. This mixture of instruments gave a syncopated rhythmic sound, which had a blend of blues, ragtime, and folk. The Jug Bands (Smithsonian Folkways) claim that jug bands such as those of Cannon were significant in the entertainment of urban Southerners, especially in cities such as Memphis in which the culture of street performance and dance music constituted the core of working-class culture.

The Jug Stompers by Cannon soon became known and one of the most popular jug bands in Memphis, second to the Memphis Jug Band. Although their last recordings were made in 1930, Cannon's Jug Stompers were one of Beale Street's most popular jug bands through the 1930s. Recording between 1928 and 1930 assisted in defining the genre, with some of the most important songs being, "Minglewood Blues", "Pig Ankle Strut", "Wolf River Blues," "Viola Lee Blues," "White House Station," and "Walk Right In" (a pop hit for The Rooftop Singers in the 1960s and for Dr. Hook in the 1970s). The latter gained particular prominence, and in the 1960s folk revival, became commercially successful.

In music, the band tapes were marked by the banjo style of Cannon, which frequently used a three-finger style of classic banjo, not the more traditional down-picking style. This method, as well as expressive performance of Noah Lewis on harmonica, helped to give the band a unique sound. Their repertoire consisted of humorous and light-hearted ditties mixed with more traditional blues themes, and both entertainment and storytelling roles of African American music of the era.

Despite the relatively short life of the group recording career, which ended at around 1930, Cannon, with his Jug Stompers, continued to play a significant part in the evolution of the jug band and folk-blues music. Their work was rediscovered in the folk revival of the mid-20th century, bringing new people into contact with early jug band recordings and establishing their role in American roots music history.

== Death ==
Gus Cannon died in Memphis, Tennessee, on October 15, 1979 at 96 years old from natural causes. He was buried at Greenview Memorial Gardens, Hernando, Mississippi.

== Discography ==
=== Studio albums ===
- Cannon & Lewis ( The 78 Rounds Society ltd, 2025)
- Walk Right In (Stax, 1963)
- Gus Cannon's Jug Stompers (Roots, 1971)

=== Compilations ===
- Cannon's Jug Stompers, The Complete Works in Chronological Order 1927–1930 including Gus Cannon as Banjo Joe (Herwin, 1975)
- Complete Recorded Works in Chronological Order, vols. 1 and 2 (Document, 1990)
- The Legendary 1928–1930 Recordings (JSP, 1994)
- The Best of Cannon's Jug Stompers (Yazoo, 2001)
