= The World of Miriam Makeba =

Studio album by Miriam Makeba
- Released: 1963
- Venue: Webster Hall (New York City)
- Studio: RCA Studio A (New York City)
- Genres: World music; African music
- Label: RCA Victor
- Producer: Hugo & Luigi

Miriam Makeba chronology
The Many Voices of Miriam Makeba (1962)	The World of Miriam Makeba (1963)	The Voice of Africa (1964)

Professional ratings
Review scores
Source	Rating
AllMusic	4/5 stars
The Encyclopedia of Popular Music	3/5 stars

The World of Miriam Makeba is the third studio album by Miriam Makeba released by RCA Victor. It charted at No. 86 on the US album chart. Hugh Masekela was credited as the conductor.

== Track listing ==
All tracks composed by Miriam Makeba; except where indicated

1. "Dubula" – 2:45
2. "Forbidden Games" (Barry Parker, Marc Lanjean) – 2:56
3. "Pole Mze" – 2:15
4. "Little Boy" (Arranged by Miriam Makeba) – 3:22
5. "Kwedini" (Jonas Gwangwa) – 2:15
6. "Vamos Chamar Ovento" (Dorival Caymmi) – 3:22
7. "Umhome" – 2:51
8. "Amampondo" – 1:55
9. "Wonders and Things" (Carol Hall) – 3:10
10. "Tonandos de Media Noche (Song at Midnight)" (Francisco Flores del Campo) – 3:06
11. "Into Yam" – 2:40
12. "Where Can I Go?" (Leo Fuld, Sigmunt Berland, Sonny Miller) – 2:52
