= Ralph Hunter =

American choral conductor

Ralph Hunter in 1960

Ralph Hunter (c. 1921 – June 3, 2002) was an American choral conductor.

He was born circa 1921 in East Orange, New Jersey. He studied at the Juilliard School after serving in the Second World War. His album The Wild, Wild West, by the Ralph Hunter Choir, was nominated for a Grammy award in 1959 in two categories, Best Engineered Recording and Best Folk Performance.

Hunter also taught music at Hunter College, where he became professor of music in 1970.

He died on June 3, 2002, in Grinnell, Iowa, where he lived with his wife Louise.

== Discography ==
- Christmas Surprises from the Ralph Hunter Choir, 1959, LPM-1968, RCA Victor
- The Wild, Wild West, 1959, LSP-2063, RCA Victor
- Two's Company: The 2 Ralph Hunter Choirs, 1960, LSP-2115, RCA Victor
