= The Rooftop Singers =

American folk music group

- Origin: United States
- Genres: Folk
- Years active: 1962–1967
- Label: Vanguard
- Past members: Erik Darling; Bill Svanoe; Lynne Taylor; Mindy Stuart; Patricia Street

The Rooftop Singers were an American country folk-singing trio in the early 1960s, best known for the hit "Walk Right In". The group was composed of Erik Darling and Bill Svanoe (vocals, guitar) with former jazz singer Lynne Taylor (vocals).

== Career ==
Darling put the group together in June 1962, specifically to record an updated and uptempo version of a 1929 Gus Cannon folk blues song, "Walk Right In". The trio recorded the song for Vanguard Records, with updated lyrics and an arrangement featuring paired 12-string acoustic guitars. The record became the most successful single in Vanguard's history.

In the U.S., the song was No. 1 for two weeks on the Billboard Hot 100 chart in early 1963. It spent five weeks atop the Easy Listening chart, which later became known as the Adult Contemporary chart. In addition, "Walk Right In" reached both the R&B chart (peaking at No. 4) as well as the country music chart (peaking at No. 23). The song reached No. 1 in Australia, according to the Kent Music Report, and it made the UK Singles Chart, peaking at No. 10. The record sold over one million copies, gaining gold disc status.

The album that contained the song was also called Walk Right In. The group was more influenced by ragtime, blues, and songster material than contemporaneous folk groups such as The Weavers, to which Darling belonged until just before he formed the Rooftop Singers. They were also less overtly political.

The group played at the Newport Folk Festival in 1963. Vanguard released several further singles, the most successful being "Tom Cat" (No. 20, May 1963). Yielding to pressure from her husband, Taylor left the trio shortly after Vanguard released the group's second album, Good Time!, and Darling and Svanoe recruited Mindy Stuart to replace her. That line-up recorded one final album, Rainy River. Patricia Street replaced Stuart shortly before the Rooftop Singers formally disbanded in 1967. Darling and Street continued working as a duo into the early 1970s, recording the album The Possible Dream for Vanguard.

Lynne Taylor, who was married to radio DJ Skip Weshner, died by suicide on 21 April 1979, aged 43. Erik Darling died on August 3, 2008, aged 74, in Chapel Hill, North Carolina, from Burkitt's lymphoma.

== Discography ==
=== Singles ===
Year	Title	Peak chart positions					Record Label	B-side	Album
Year	Title	US Pop	US AC	US Country	US R&B	UK	Record Label	B-side	Album
1962	"Walk Right In"	1	1	23	4	10	Vanguard	"Cool Water"	Walk Right In!
1963	"Tom Cat"	20	—	—	30	—	Vanguard	"Shoes"	Walk Right In!
1963	"Mama Don't Allow"	55	20	—	—	—	Vanguard	"It Don't Mean a Thing"	Good Time!
1964	"Sail Away Ladies"	—	—	—	—	—	Vanguard	"Twelve-String"	Good Time!
1965	"Rainy River"	—	—	—	—	—	Vanguard	"Buddy, Won't You Roll Down the Line"	Rainy River
1965	"Ham and Eggs"	—	—	—	—	—	Vanguard	"Somebody Came Home"	Walk Right In!
1967	"Kites"	—	—	—	—	—	Atco	"My Life Is My Own"	

== See also ==
- List of folk musicians
- List of artists who reached number one in the United States
- List of artists who reached number one on the U.S. Adult Contemporary chart
