= Robert De Cormier =

- Birth name: Robert Romeo De Cormier Jr.
- Also known as: Bob Corman
- Born: January 7, 1922; Farmingdale, New York, U.S.
- Died: November 7, 2017 (aged 95); Rutland, Vermont, U.S.
- Occupation(s): Conductor, director, music teacher

Robert Romeo De Cormier Jr. (January 7, 1922 – November 7, 2017), sometimes known as Robert Corman, was an American musical conductor, arranger, and director. He arranged music for many singers and groups, including Harry Belafonte and Peter, Paul and Mary, and worked with Milt Okun.

== Biography ==
Robert De Cormier was born in Farmingdale, New York, and grew up in Poughkeepsie, New York. His father was a shop teacher of French-Canadian heritage, and his mother was a Swedish-born guitarist. De Cormier took up the trumpet at age 7, and continued while attending Colby College in Maine and the University of New Mexico. His trumpet playing ended during World War II, when a German mortar shell nearly severed his right wrist while his Army infantry unit was advancing toward the Rhine River. While recovering at a hospital on Staten Island, he began singing with the CIO chorus, which was where he met and started a lifelong association with Pete Seeger.

Because of McCarthyism, and the fact that he had joined the Communist Party as a young man, De Cormier used the name Robert Corman as a pseudonym on many Harry Belafonte recordings.

After the war, De Cormier attended and graduated from the Juilliard School. He was the music teacher and chorus director at Elisabeth Irwin High School on Charlton Street, New York City, part of the Little Red School House on Bleecker Street, New York City. It was there that he met and mentored Mary Travers. He and his wife, actress and singer Louise De Cormier, collected and recorded folk songs from the Catskill Mountains of New York. He arranged the music in The Weavers Songbook. He also arranged for Peter, Paul and Mary.

Robert De Cormier has composed music for chorus as well as ballet and Broadway scores, but is perhaps most famous for his spiritual arrangements.. His ballet score Rainbow 'Round My Shoulder is in the active repertoire of the Alvin Ailey American Dance Theater. He has directed concerts and recordings for television specials, and was choral director for a television special and recording, starring Jessye Norman and Kathleen Battle, and conducted by James Levine.

De Cormier was the conductor and leader of The Belafonte Folk Singers during most of its lifetime, from 1957 to 1965. He also headed The Robert De Cormier Singers, who performed extensively in the mid-1960s and then sporadically until the mid-1990s.

Robert De Cormier was the music director and conductor of the New York Choral Society from 1970 to 1987 and was a music director emeritus. In 1993, De Cormier helped to found the Vermont Symphony Orchestra Chorus, which he conducted until his retirement in 2014. He founded Counterpoint, a Vermont-based choral group, consisting of eleven members. He has conducted music for the operas Der Kaiser von Atlantis and Brundibár. He has also recorded several Christmas albums with his choral group, The Robert De Cormier Singers. He was also music director at Elizabeth Irwin High School in New York City in the late 50's.

De Cormier taught a class at Saint Michael's College in Colchester, Vermont, entitled "Songs of Resistance: Music in Struggle" in 2008. Recently, De Cormier conducted at the Vermont International Music Festival in the summer of 2009. In the winter of 2012, he directed the chorus at the Vermont High School Honors Music Festival, held at Castleton State College.

De Cormier died of kidney failure in Rutland, Vermont, at the age of 95.

== Memberships and honors ==
De Cormier served on the New York State Council on the Arts, and was a member of the choral panel for the National Endowment for the Arts. He was presented the 2002 Governor's Award for Excellence in the Arts by the Vermont Arts Council, and Lifetime Achievement awards from the New York Choral Society and Choral Arts New England.

He was awarded an honorary Doctor of Arts degree from Middlebury College in 2007, and an honorary degree from the University of Vermont in 2012.
