= Fran Minkoff =

Frances M. Minkoff
- Born: February 5, 1915; New York, New York, U.S.
- Died: April 22, 2002 (aged 87); New York, New York, U.S.
- Occupation(s): Lyricist, poet

Frances Minkoff (February 5, 1915 – April 22, 2002) was an American lyricist best known for her songs co-written with Fred Hellerman of The Weavers.

== Career ==
Her collaborations include the anti-war song "Come Away Melinda", recorded in 1963 by Harry Belafonte.

Minkoff died in New York City at the age of 87.
