= Percy Brice =

American jazz drummer (1923–2020)

Austin Percy Brice Jr. (March 25, 1923 – November 2020), nicknamed Big P, was an American jazz drummer.

Brice was born in March 1923 in New York City. His professional career began around the end of World War II, when he played with Benny Carter, Mercer Ellington, Luis Russell, and Eddie Cleanhead Vinson. He played frequently in Harlem in the early 1950s with Tiny Grimes, Oscar Pettiford, Tab Smith, Lucky Thompson, and Cootie Williams, in addition to leading sessions at Minton's Playhouse. He then played with Billy Taylor (1954-1956), George Shearing (1956-1958), and Kenny Burrell (1958–59); from 1959 to 1961 he played behind Sarah Vaughan on tour.

Brice was Harry Belafonte's drummer for most of the 1960s; he also worked with Ahmad Jamal, Carmen McRae and Mary Lou Williams in that decade. He led a group called the New Sounds in the early 1970s, and worked with Sy Oliver and Illinois Jacquet, as well as in Broadway orchestras, later in his career. He died in November 2020 at the age of 97.
