= Miriam Makeba discography =

- Studio albums: 23
- EPs: 3
- Live albums: 5
- Compilation albums: 19
- Singles: 16

This is a discography of South African musician Miriam Makeba (1932–2008).

== Studio albums ==
- Miriam Makeba (1960) (LP RCA Victor LPM/LSP-2267)
- The Many Voices of Miriam Makeba (1962) (LP Kapp KL1274)
- The World of Miriam Makeba (1963) (LP RCA Victor LPM/LSP-2750) #86 (US)
- The Voice of Africa (1964) (LP RCA Victor LPM/LSP-2845) #122 (US)
- Makeba Sings! (1965) (LP RCA Victor LPM/LSP-3321)
- An Evening with Belafonte/Makeba (1965) (LP with Harry Belafonte; RCA Victor LPM/LSP-3420; Grammy Award for Best Ethnic or Traditional Folk Recording) #85 (US)
- The Magic of Makeba (1965) (LP RCA Victor LPM/LSP-3512)
- The Magnificent Miriam Makeba (1966) (LP Mercury 134016)
- All About Miriam (1966) (LP Mercury 134029)
- Pata Pata (1967) (LP Reprise RS6274) #74 (US)
- Makeba! (1968) (LP Reprise RS6310)
- Keep Me in Mind (1970) (LP Reprise RS6381)
- A Promise (1974) (LP RCA YSPL1-544)
- Miriam Makeba & Bongi (1975) (LP with Bongi Makeba; Guinea: Editions Syliphone Conakry SLP 48)
- Country Girl (1978) (LP Sonodisc ESP165518)
- Comme une symphonie d'amour (1979) (LP Sonodisc ESP 7501)
- Sangoma (1988) (CD Warner Bros. 25673)
- Welela (1989) (CD Gallo CDGSP3084) #6 (US World Music Albums)
- Eyes on Tomorrow (1991) (CD Gallo CDGSP3086) #10 (US World Music Albums)
- Sing Me a Song (1993) (CD CDS12702)
- Homeland (2000) (CD Putumayo PUTU1642)
- Reflections (2004) (CD Gallo Music GWVCD-51) #12 (US World Music Albums)
- Forever (2006) (CD Gallo Music CDGURB-082) - compilation

== Live albums ==
- Miriam Makeba in Concert! (1967) (LP) (Reprise RS6253) #182 (US)
- Live in Tokyo (1968) (LP) (Reprise SJET8082)
- Live in Conakry: Appel a l'Afrique (1974) (LP) (Sonodisc SLP22)
- Enregistrement public au Theatre des Champs-Elysées (1977) (LP) (released on CD6508 as Pata Pata: Live in Paris in 1998)
- Live at Berns Salonger, Stockholm, Sweden, 1966 (2003) (CD and DVD) (Gallo Music GWVCD-49)

== Compilations ==
- The Best of Miriam Makeba (LP) Canada: RCA Victor LSP-3982, 1968
- Harry Belafonte and Miriam Makeba (2xLP) RCA International (Camden) PJL2-8042, 1975
- Miriam Makeba (LP) Italy: Record Bazaar RB 254, 1980
- The Queen of African Music (CD) Verlag Pläne 831 655–938, 1987
- Africa (CD) Germany: Novus 3155-2-N/ND 83155, 1991
- Miriam Makeba and The Skylarks: Volume 1 (as Miriam Makeba and The Skylarks; Remastered from 78/45 RPM recorded between 1956 and 1959) (CD) TELCD 2303, 1991
- Folk Songs from Africa (CD) SAAR CD 12514, 1994
- En public à Paris et Conakry (CD), 1996
- Hits and Highlights (CD), 1997
- Miriam Makeba and The Skylarks: Volume 2 (as Miriam Makeba and The Skylarks; Remastered from 78/45 RPM recorded between 1956 and 1959) (CD) TELCD 2315, 1997
- The Best of Miriam Makeba (CD) BMG/RCA, 2000
- Legend (CD) Next Music CDSL21, 2001
- Mama Africa: The Very Best of Miriam Makeba (CD), 2001
- The Guinea Years (CD/LP) STCD3017/SLP48, 2001
- Mother Africa: The Black Anthology (CD), 2002
- The Best of Miriam Makeba: The Early Years (CD) Wrasse WRASS 088, 2002
- The Definitive Collection (CD) UK: Wrasse WRASS 062, 2002
- Her Essential Recordings (2xCD) Manteca MANTDBL502, 2006
- Mama Afrika 1932–2008 (CD) Gallo, 2009

== Extended plays ==
- Makeba – Belafonte (as Miriam Makeba and Harry Belafonte) (Vinyl, 7", 45 RPM) Germany: RCA Victor EPA 9035, 1961
- The Click Song (Vinyl, 7", EP) France: London RE 10.145, 1963
- Chants d'Afrique (Vinyl, 7") France: RCA Victor 86.374, 1964

== Singles ==
- "Duze" (1956) (10-inch shellac 78 rpm mono Gallotone GB.2062)
- "Pass Office Special" (1957) (10-inch shellac 78 rpm mono Gallotone GB.2134)
- "The Click Song" / "Mbube" (1963) (7-inch vinyl London HL 9747)
- "Pata Pata" (1967) (7-inch vinyl Reprise 0606) #12 (US)
- "Malayisha" (1967) (7-inch vinyl Reprise)
- "What is Love" (1968)
- "Emavungwini" (1968) (7-inch vinyl France, Spain: Reprise)
- "I Shall Be Released" / "Iphi Ndilela (Show Me the Way)" (1969) (7-inch vinyl Germany: Reprise RA 0804)
- "Pata Pata" / "Click Song Number 1" (1972) (7-inch vinyl Germany, Netherlands: Reprise REP 14 217)
- "Malaika" / "Malcolm X" (1975) (7-inch vinyl Kenya: Sonafric SYL 565)
- "We Got to Make It" / "Promise" (1975) 7-inch vinyl with Instrumentalgruppe German Democratic Republic: AMIGA 4 56 044, 1974, and France: Disques Espérance
- "Pata Pata" / "Malayisha" (1976) (7-inch vinyl Italy: Reprise 14 267, released in France in 1978)
- "Hauteng" / "Talking and Dialoging" (1978) (7-inch vinyl France: Disques Espérance ESP 155027)
- "Comme une symphonie d'amour" (1979) (7-inch vinyl France: Disques Espérance ESP 65.009)
- "Give Me a Reason" / "Africa" (1989) (7-inch vinyl Italy: Philips 875 308-7)
- "Pata Pata 2000" (2000) (CD Putumayo PUTU 919-S)
