= Reflections (Miriam Makeba album) =

Studio album by Miriam Makeba
- Released: 2004
- Recorded: 2003–2004
- Genre: World music, African music
- Label: Gallo

Miriam Makeba chronology
Homeland (2000)	Reflections (2004)	Forever (2006)

Professional ratings
Review scores
Source	Rating
The Encyclopedia of Popular Music	3/5 stars

Reflections is the 2004 final studio album of Miriam Makeba. It won three prizes at the South African Music Awards in 2004.

== Track listing ==
All tracks composed by Miriam Makeba; except where indicated

1. "Where Are You Going?" (Hugh Masekela) - 4:00
2. "I'm In Love with Spring" (George Patterson, William Salter) - 3:27
3. "Mas Que Nada" Jorge Ben 3:15
4. "Xica da Silva" Jorge Ben 6:10
5. "Click Song" 4:53
6. "Pata Pata" 3:23
7. "Quit It" (Bongi Makeba, Caiphus Semenya) - 5:30
8. "Comme Une Symphonie D'Amour" 3:16
9. "Iyaguduza" 6:22
10. "African Convention" (Hugh Masekela) - 4:59
11. "Ring Bell" (Jerry Ragovoy) - 3:15
12. "I Shall Sing" (Van Morrison) - 7:10
13. "Love Tastes Like Strawberries" 5:05
