= Michael Levinsohn =

South African entrepreneur (born 1962)

Michael Levinsohn (born 25 January 1962) is a South African entrepreneur who has successfully established a number of mobile marketing businesses and financed the production of some albums by notable musicians, including Miriam Makeba and Rick Wakeman.

== History ==
Michael Levinsohn was born on 25 January 1962 in Johannesburg, South Africa.

Michael matriculated at Potchefstroom High School for Boys in 1979. He represented his school and province (state) at both field hockey and biathlon. He also won an Inter High Schools speech competition. He completed his compulsory national service in 1981, at 1 Special Service Battalion, graduating as a 2nd Lieutenant and attended the University of the Witwatersrand for three years, where he read for a law degree.

=== Entrepreneurship ===
Between 1988 and 2005 he co-founded a number of businesses including Kismet Marketing (Pty) Ltd., Atlantic Finance & Investment Holdings (Pty) Ltd., and Digital Vouchers (Pty) Ltd. He was also a director of various companies listed on the JSE Securities Exchange including Lanchem Ltd., Ventel Ltd., and Integrated Consumer Products Ltd, where he was the controlling shareholder and chief executive officer. In March 2008, USA based Sovereign Wealth Corp acquired all of the issued and outstanding shares in Digital Vouchers (Pty) Ltd, a business Michael founded in 2003, in an all share exchange agreement. He was subsequently appointed president and chief executive officer of Sovereign Wealth Corp. which was renamed Lenco Mobile Inc.

In 1998, Michael co-founded Webworks (Pty) Ltd., the company which developed the smart card based Infinity CRM program, which became the largest privately owned CRM and loyalty program in South Africa, with 1.2 million cardholders. Infinity's technology was recognized internationally as leading edge at the time. Infinity was invited to become a partner in MasterCard's international vendor program in 2002. Infinity was also voted the leading independent loyalty program in South Africa in 2002 in an independent study carried out by World Wide Worx (Pty) Ltd.

For twenty years, Michael was the managing director of Sterling Trust (Pty) Ltd, a company he co-founded in 1985. Sterling Trust (Pty) Ltd advised many South African companies on mergers and acquisitions in the technology, light engineering and financial services sectors. He is also a director of 121 Marketing (Pty) Ltd., a strategic marketing company that focuses on the customer relationship management and loyalty industries. Levinsohn was appointed the CEO of Mobicom Corporation in January 2008. He was also formerly responsible for the investments of the South African National Civics Organisation. In January 2009 he was responsible for establishing Lenco Mobile Inc., in the United States of America. Lenco Mobile Inc. provides mobile marketing services.

In July 2011, he published a white paper entitled: Ten Trends That Will affect The Future of Mobile Marketing In 2011, he was a committee member of the Mobile Marketing Association's panel on permission based mobile marketing. In 2012, he was appointed to co-chair the Mobile Marketing Association's Marketing Best Practices for Messaging committee, which published a white paper in March 2014.

In December 2011, Lenco Mobile Inc, merged with iLoop Mobile Inc., a mobile marketing company, based in Seattle, WA. The merged entity, Archer Mobile was considered a world leader in mobile marketing and multimedia messaging technology. Archer Mobile had offices in Seattle, Atlanta, Newport Beach, Chicago, Johannesburg, Mexico City, Singapore and Sydney. Archer's clients included Coca-Cola, Citibank, Starbucks, Western-Union, Skype, Xbox and Experian. Archer Mobile was sold to IMI Mobile UK in 2015.

In early 2008 Michael expanded his business interests to include his passion for motor racing and he formed a partnership with Intersport Racing, a leading American Le Mans, LMP Prototype racing team to build the commercial arm of Intersport Racing. This relationship was discontinued in 2010. In 2013 he formed a new company in partnership with world-renowned sports car champion and team owner, Wayne Taylor. The new company provides mobile marketing services to the motor racing and automotive industries. He was also appointed President of Wayne Taylor Racing in January 2014, and spent a year developing the team's commercial program.

Michael is an expert in customer relationship management programs and strategy. A number of articles written by him about CRM and loyalty have been published by leading South African journals. He has also developed and been awarded a provisional patent for his innovative Mobile Phone and Internet CRM program which provides brand owners and consumers with a fully integrated mobile phone CRM program, and has co-authored patents for the delivery of MMS messages to mobile phones.

=== Music ===
In 1991, Michael co-financed the production of former Yes keyboardist Rick Wakeman's album African Bach through Atlantic Finance and Investment Holdings.

In 2000, he was the Executive Producer and financier of Miriam Makeba's album Homeland, which was nominated for a Grammy Award as Best World Music Album.

Michael was also a co-owner for five years of The Blues Room, which was voted the top live music venue in Johannesburg six times in a row.
