= Africa (Miriam Makeba album) =

Compilation album by Miriam Makeba
- Released: October 1991
- Genre: African music
- Label: Novus
- Producer: John Snyder

Miriam Makeba chronology
Eyes on Tomorrow (1991)	Africa (1991)	Homeland (2000)

Professional ratings
Review scores
Source	Rating
Encyclopedia of Popular Music	3/5 stars

Africa is a collection of songs from the 1970s by South African singer Miriam Makeba. The collection was produced and released on CD by Novus Records in October 1991.

== Track listing ==
1. "Mbube"
2. "Nomeva"
3. "Olilili"
4. "Suliram"
5. "Retreat Song"
6. "Click Song"
7. "Saduva"
8. "Iya Guduza"
9. "Lakutshon Ilanga"
10. "Umhome"
11. "Amanpondo"
12. "Dubula"
13. "Kwendini"
14. "Umhome"
15. "Pole Mze"
16. "Le fleuve"
17. "Qhude"
18. "Mayibuye"
19. "Maduna"
20. "Kilimanjaro"
21. "Kwazulu (In the Land of the Zulus)"
22. "Nongqongqq (To Those We Love)"
23. "Khawuleza"
24. "Ndodemnyama (Beware Verwoerd)"
