= Yamboo =

German pop music group

- Origin: Dortmund, Germany
- Genres: Eurodance, Pop, Euro-House, Schlager, EDM
- Years active: 1999–2009
- Members: Silvie Prvu (1999–2006, 2009); Gisele (1999–2006, 2009); Michelle (2009); Medi (2009)
- Past members: Unidentified (1999–2001)

Yamboo was a German Euro-Dance duo. The duo was founded in 1999. Their biggest hit was the single "Fiesta de la noche (The Sailor Dance)" released also in 1999. Most of their hits were remakes and covers of known songs. The band had one album Okama de Mapouka that included most of their hits.

== Career ==
Yamboo was founded in 1999, consisting of Silvie Prvu (born 27 July 1978 in Schwelm, Germany) of Romanian and Yugoslav origin and Gisele (born 26 March 1974 in Leuven, Belgium) of Ugandan and Cape Verdean origin. The first single "Fiesta de la noche (The Sailor Dance)" became a hit entered the Top German Top 20 chart, also charting in Austria and Switzerland. This was followed "Come with Me (Bailamos)" also in 1999 and "Torero (Aya baila)" in 2000 followed by a series of other hits like a cover of the Russian song "Kalinka" and a cover of the Afro-pop dance song "Pata Pata" made famous by Miriam Makeba. The hit "Sing Hallelujah" featured Dr. Alban. The duo was active until 2006 releasing the album Okama de Mapouka in 2006 compiling all the hit singles of the band.

After a three-year break, the duo had a comeback in 2009 adding Michele and Medi and a fifth non-identified person. They replaced two previous singers the band had used on stage, while Sylvie Prvu and Gisele remained in the background. The band released the single "Discothèque". Since 2009, no more releases followed and the project was folded soon.

== Discography ==
=== Albums ===
- 2006: Okama de Mapouka
- 2007: Best Of (compilation album)

=== Singles ===
Year	Title	Chart positions		
Year	Title	GER	AUT	SWI
1999	"Fiesta de la noche (The Sailor Dance)"	17	25	50
1999	"Come with Me (Bailamos)"	48	–	87
2000	"Torero (Aya baila)"	71	–	–
2001	"Kalinka"	59	74	–
2001	"Pata Pata"	17	–	–
2002	"Star"	–	–	–
2005	"Mapouka"	56	–	–
2005	"Sing Hallelujah" (feat. Dr. Alban)	74	–	–
2006	"Oh Suzanna"	–	–	–
2007	"Discotheque"	–	–	–

== See also ==
- Music of Germany
