= Miriam Makeba & Bongi =

1975 album by Miriam Makeba and Bongi Makeba

Studio album by Miriam Makeba, Bongi Makeba
- Released: 1975
- Genre: World music, African music
- Label: Editions Syliphone Conakry

Miriam Makeba, Bongi Makeba chronology
A Promise (1974) (1974)	Miriam Makeba & Bongi (1975)	Country Girl (1978)

Miriam Makeba & Bongi is a 1975 album by Miriam Makeba, released by Editions Syliphone Conakry.

== Track listing ==
1. "L’Enfant Et La Gazelle"
2. "Lovely Lies"
3. "Africa (Ifrikia)"
4. "Amampondo"
5. "Everything For You My Love"
6. "Do You Remember Malcolm?"
7. "Jeux Interdits (Forbidden Games)"
8. "West Wind Unification"
9. "Dakhla Yunik"
10. "Milele"
11. "That’s The Kind Of Love"
12. "I Was So Glad"
