= Sing Me a Song =

Sing Me a Song may refer to:

- Sing Me a Song (song), the Dutch entry in the Eurovision Song Contest 1983
- Sing Me a Song (The Walking Dead), an episode of the television series The Walking Dead
- Sing Me a Song (album), an album by Miriam Makeba
