= A luta continua =

Rallying cry of the FRELIMO movement

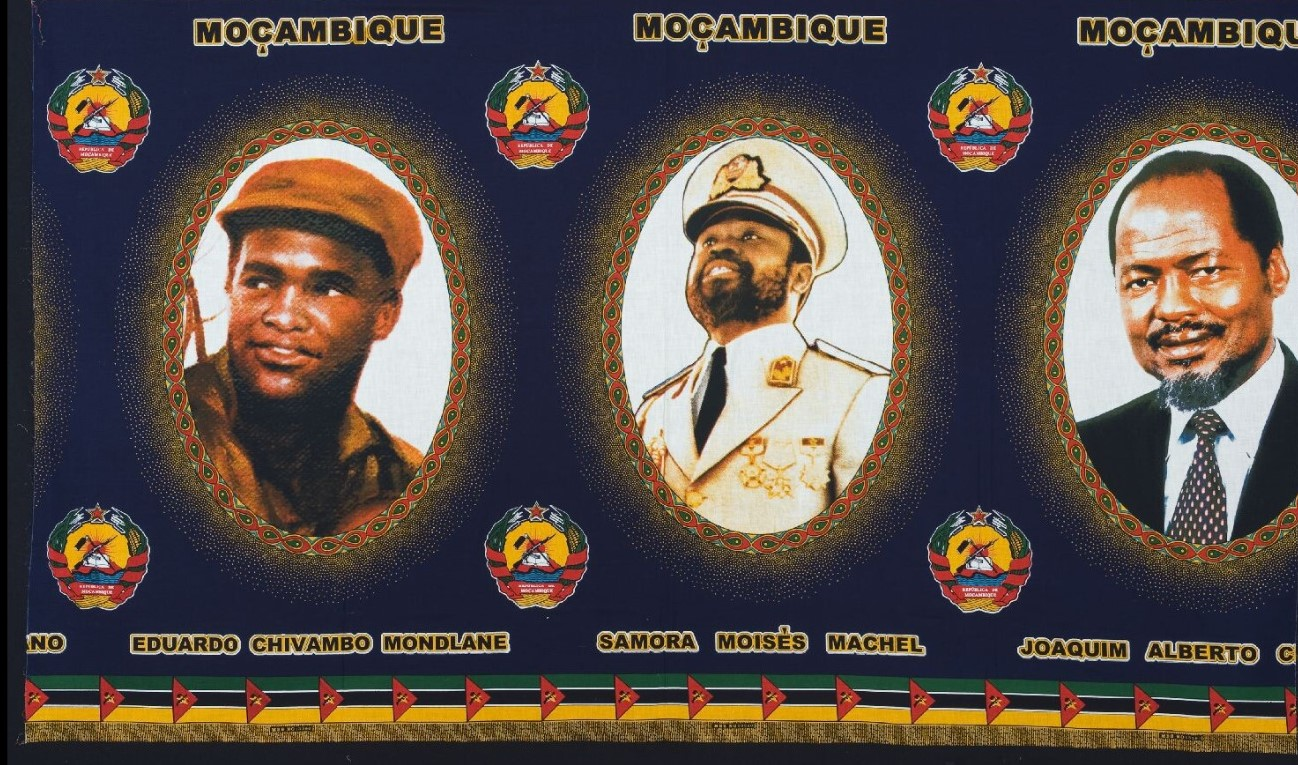
Portraits of FRELIMO leaders Mondlane and Machel, who popularized the slogan.

"A luta continua" (Portuguese for "the struggle continues") was a slogan used by the FRELIMO movement during Mozambique's war for independence from Portuguese colonial rule. The phrase, coined by FRELIMO's first president, Eduardo Chivambo Mondlane, was employed to rally support in the liberated zones of Mozambique. After Mondlane's assassination in 1969, his successor, Samora Machel, continued to use the slogan to mobilize the population in the post-independence era. Machel, who became the first president of an independent Mozambique in 1975, utilized "A luta continua" as an unofficial national motto. The slogan encapsulated Mondlane's vision: "We fight together, and together we rebuild and recreate our country, producing a new reality—a New Mozambique, United and Freed."

The phrase remains culturally significant in Mozambique, with posters bearing the slogan still visible in Maputo, the nation's capital.

== Use by activist movements ==
"A luta continua" has been adopted by various activist movements globally. In Uganda, LGBT rights activists wore T-shirts with the phrase at the funeral of David Kato in 2011. The phrase has also been used by Ugandan opposition leader Bobi Wine.

In Nigeria, the slogan has been embraced by students and activists. It is the motto of the National Association of Nigerian Students and is often shortened to "Aluta." The full version, "A luta continua; vitória é certa," meaning "The struggle continues; victory is certain," is commonly used during protests and demonstrations.

In Portugal, the phrase is still commonly used as a political slogan, often associated with the Carnation revolution and by left-wing movements and parties.

The phrase also gained prominence during the 2016 South African #FeesMustFall protests. Likewise the South African feminist activist and survivor Mickey Meji, founder and leader of the Kwanele movement, adopted the motto to further the struggle for the abolition of prostitution throughout Africa.

Additionally, it has been used by human rights activists in Indonesia, particularly during the 2019 protests and riots, to demand government action on unresolved human rights violations.

== Use in popular media ==
The phrase "A luta continua" has appeared in various forms of media. It was the title of a 1971 documentary film on the Mozambican independence struggle. South African singer Miriam Makeba popularized a Mozambique-inspired song titled "A Luta Continua," written by her daughter Bongi after attending Mozambique's independence ceremony in 1975. The song was later released on Makeba's 1989 album Welela.

Additionally, American director Jonathan Demme included the phrase at the end of the credits in four of his films: Something Wild (1986), Married to the Mob (1988), The Silence of the Lambs (1991), and Philadelphia (1993).

In the United Kingdom, the phrase appears on a sign in Reading Central Club's black culture mural in Reading, Berkshire.
