= Country Girl (Miriam Makeba album) =

Studio album by Miriam Makeba
- Released: 1978
- Genre: World music, African music

Miriam Makeba chronology
Miriam Makeba & Bongi (1975)	Country Girl (1978)	Comme une symphonie d'amour (1979)

Professional ratings
Review scores
Source	Rating
The Encyclopedia of Popular Music	2/5 stars

Country Girl is a 1978 album by Miriam Makeba. The album was recorded in Kumasi, Ghana, but completed in New York City with members of Ipi Tombi.

== Track listing ==
1. "Witch Doctor (Isangoma)"
2. "Country Girl"
3. "Tailor Man"
4. "Xica da Silva", Jorge Ben
5. "Meet Me at the River"
6. "The Lion Cries (Mbube)"
7. "Goodbye Poverty"
8. "Click Song"
