= Keep Me in Mind (Miriam Makeba album) =

Studio album by Miriam Makeba
- Released: 1970
- Genres: World music, African music
- Labels: Reprise, RS 6381
- Producer: Lewis Merenstein

Miriam Makeba chronology
Makeba! (1968)	Keep Me in Mind (1970)	A Promise (1974)

Professional ratings
Review scores
Source	Rating
AllMusic	3.5/5 stars
The Encyclopedia of Popular Music	3/5 stars

Keep Me in Mind is a 1970 album by Miriam Makeba. The album juxtaposes Makeba's own compositions, and one "Lumumba" by her daughter Bongi, with songs by Stephen Stills, Van Morrison, Lennon-McCartney and John Fogerty.

== Track listing ==
1. "Lumumba" (Bongi Makeba)
2. "For What It's Worth" (Stephen Stills)
3. "Brand New Day" (Van Morrison)
4. "I Shall Sing" (Van Morrison)
5. "Kulala" (Makeba)
6. "In My Life" (Lennon-McCartney)
7. "Down on the Corner" (John Fogerty)
8. "Ibande" (Makeba)
9. "Measure the Valleys" (Robert Brittan)
10. "Tululu" (Makeba)
