= All About Miriam =

Studio album by Miriam Makeba
- Released: 1966
- Genre: World music, African music
- Label: Mercury

Miriam Makeba chronology
| The Magnificent Miriam Makeba (1966) | All About Miriam (1966) | Pata Pata (1967) |

Professional ratings
Review scores
| Source | Rating |
|---|---|
| AllMusic | 4.5/5 stars |

All About Miriam is the 1966 ninth studio album of Miriam Makeba (LP Mercury 134029). Arrangements for the album were by Luchi DeJesus and Sivuca (as Severino Dias De Olivera). Sivuca also played guitar. Harold Dodson played bass, and drummer was Leopoldo Flemming.

== Track listing ==
1. "The Ballad of the Sad Young Men" (Fran Landesman, Tommy Wolf) 3:00
2. "Yetentu Tizaleny" 2:34
3. "Maria Fulô" baião (Severino Dias de Oliveira) 2:53
4. "I Think I Ought To" (Buddy Bernier) 2:11
5. "Click Song (Number 1)" (Miriam Makeba) 2:16
6. "To Love and Lose" (William Salter) 3:33
7. "Four-Letter Words" (Margo Guryan) 2:16
8. "U Shaka" 2:47
9. "Mas Que Nada" samba (Jorge Ben Jor) 2:52
10. "Mommy, Mommy What Is Heaven Like?" 2:46
11. "Jol'inkomo" 2:59
12. "The Sound of a Drum" (William Salter) 3:00
