= Sing Me a Song (album) =

Studio album by Miriam Makeba
- Released: 1993
- Recorded: 1993
- Genre: World music, African music

Miriam Makeba chronology
| Eyes on Tomorrow (1991) | Sing Me a Song (1993) | Homeland (2000) |

Professional ratings
Review scores
| Source | Rating |
|---|---|
| Encyclopedia of Popular Music | 4/5 stars |

Sing Me a Song is a 1993 album by Miriam Makeba. It was her first album recorded in South Africa, in a studio in Mmabatho, Bophuthatswana.

== Track listing ==
1. Sing Me a Song
2. Bass Rap
3. N'Diarabi
4. Moody Moods
5. Thula Mntanami
6. Generation Rap
7. Known Unsung Hero
8. I Long to Return
9. Serenade Me
10. Bambarana
11. Choo Choo Train / Shuku Shuku
12. Ivory Song
13. My People
14. Laktushona Ilanga
15. Good Grunge
16. Prendre Un Enfant
