= Miriam Makeba (album) =

Studio album by Miriam Makeba
- Released: 11 May 1960
- Venue: Webster Hall, New York City
- Genre: World music, African music
- Length: 34:42 (LP); 35:07 (CD)
- Label: RCA Victor (U.S.) Gallo Africa
- Producer: Bob Bollard

Miriam Makeba chronology
Miriam Makeba (1960)	The Many Voices of Miriam Makeba (1962)

Professional ratings
Review scores
Source	Rating
AllMusic	4/5 stars
The Encyclopedia of Popular Music	4/5 stars

Miriam Makeba is the debut album by Miriam Makeba. It was released in 1960 by RCA Victor. The album is included in the book 1001 Albums You Must Hear Before You Die.

== Track listing ==
No.	Title	Writer(s)	Length
1.	"The Retreat Song"	Miriam Makeba	2:34
2.	"Suliram" (Indonesian lullaby)	Charles Carl Carter	2:45
3.	"The Click Song"	Makeba, Khoza, Majola, Mdedle, Mogosti	2:09
4.	"Umhome"	Makeba	1:16
5.	"Olilili"	Silinga	2:31
6.	"Lakutshn, Ilanga"	Mackay Davashe, Glazer	2:07
7.	"Mbube" (with the Chad Mitchell Trio)	Solomon Linda	3:17
8.	"The Naughty Little Flea"	Norman Thomas	3:45
9.	"Where Does It Lead?"	Gwen Davis	2:29
10.	"Nomeva"	Makeba	2:37
11.	"House of the Rising Sun"	Perry Lopez	1:57
12.	"Saduva"	Makeba	2:30
13.	"One More Dance" (with Charles Colman)	Charles Carl Carter	2:40
14.	"Iya Guduza"	Makeba	2:05

== Personnel ==
- Miriam Makeba – vocals
- Perry Lopez – guitar
- The Belafonte Folk Singers conducted by Milt Okun
