= Welela =

1989 studio album by Miriam Makeba

Studio album by Miriam Makeba
- Released: 1989
- Genre: South African music
- Length: 45:11
- Labels: Phonocomp, Mercury
- Producers: Sipho Mabuse, Roberto Meglioli

Miriam Makeba chronology
Sangoma (1988)	Welela (1989)	Eyes on Tomorrow (1991)

Welela is an album by the South African musician Miriam Makeba, released in 1989. It was produced primarily by Sipho Mabuse.

== Critical reception ==
Professional ratings
Review scores
Source	Rating
AllMusic	3/5 stars
The Encyclopedia of Popular Music	3/5 stars
Hi-Fi News & Record Review	A:1/2

The New York Times wrote that "Makeba mixes old and new on Welela, using a polished modern production to carry recent and traditional songs," and deemed "A Luta Continua" "one of the most infectious agitprop songs of the decade."

== Track listing ==
1. "Amampondo" (Miriam Makeba) – 5:20
2. "African Sunset" (Sipho Mabuse) – 5:49
3. "Djiu de Galinha" (José Carlos Schwarz) – 4:08
4. "A luta continua" (Makeba) – 4:40
5. "Soweto Blues" (Hugh Masekela, S. Todd) – 4:18
6. "Welela" (Nelson Lee) – 3:18
7. "Hapo Zamani" (Makeba, Dorothy Masuka) – 4:29
8. "Pata Pata" (Makeba, Jerry Ragovoy) – 3:53
9. "Saduva" (Makeba) – 4:43
10. "Africa" (Keith Mathela) – 4:33

== Personnel ==
- Miriam Makeba – Lead vocal
- Sipho Mabuse, Dorothy Masuka, Doreen Webster – Backing vocals
- Keith Mathela – Guitars
- Claude Deppa – Trumpet
- Claudio Pascoli, Michael "Bami" Rose – Sax
- Emmanuel "Chulo" Gatewood – Bass
- Damon Duewhite – Drums
- Smith Ailar – Percussion
- Loulou Laguerre – Keyboards

Production

- Produced by Sipho Mabuse & Roberto Meglioli
- Post-production by Allan Goldberg
- Recorded & engineered by Toby Alington & Jean Trenchant
- Mixed by Sipho Mabuse & Allan Goldberg
