= Pata Pata (album) =

Studio album by Miriam Makeba
- Released: 1967
- Studio: TownSound, Eaglewood, New Jersey
- Genre: World music, African music
- Length: 35:31
- Label: Reprise
- Producer: Jerry Ragovoy; Jimmy Wisner; Luchi DeJesus; Sivuca

Miriam Makeba chronology
All About Miriam (1966)	Pata Pata (1967)	Makeba! (1968)

Professional ratings
Review scores
Source	Rating
AllMusic	4.5/5 stars
The Encyclopedia of Popular Music	2/5 stars

Pata Pata is a 1967 album by Miriam Makeba. The album charted at number 74 in the US albums chart. Most of the recordings were new, though Sivuca's "Maria Fulo" was included again, from the previous album All About Miriam.

== Track listing ==
1. "Pata Pata" – single
2. "Ha Po Zamani"
3. "What Is Love" – single
4. "Maria Fulo"
5. "Yetentu Tizaleny"
6. "Click Song Number One"
7. "Ring Bell, Ring Bell"
8. "Jol'inkomo"
9. "West Wind"
10. "Saduva"
11. "A Piece of Ground"
