= Sivuca =

Brazilian musician (1930–2006)

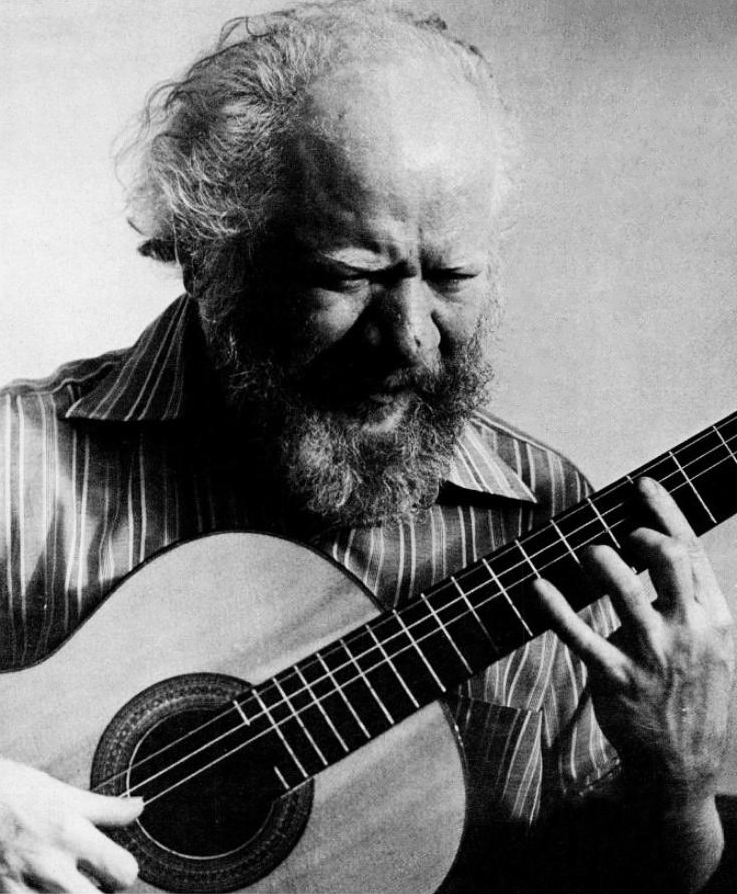
- Sivuca in 1972

Background information
- Born: Severino Dias de Oliveira; May 26, 1930; Itabaiana, Paraíba, Brazil
- Died: December 14, 2006 (aged 76) João Pessoa, Paraíba
- Genres: Latin, jazz
- Occupations: Musician, composer
- Instruments: Accordion, guitar
- Years active: 1950s–2000s

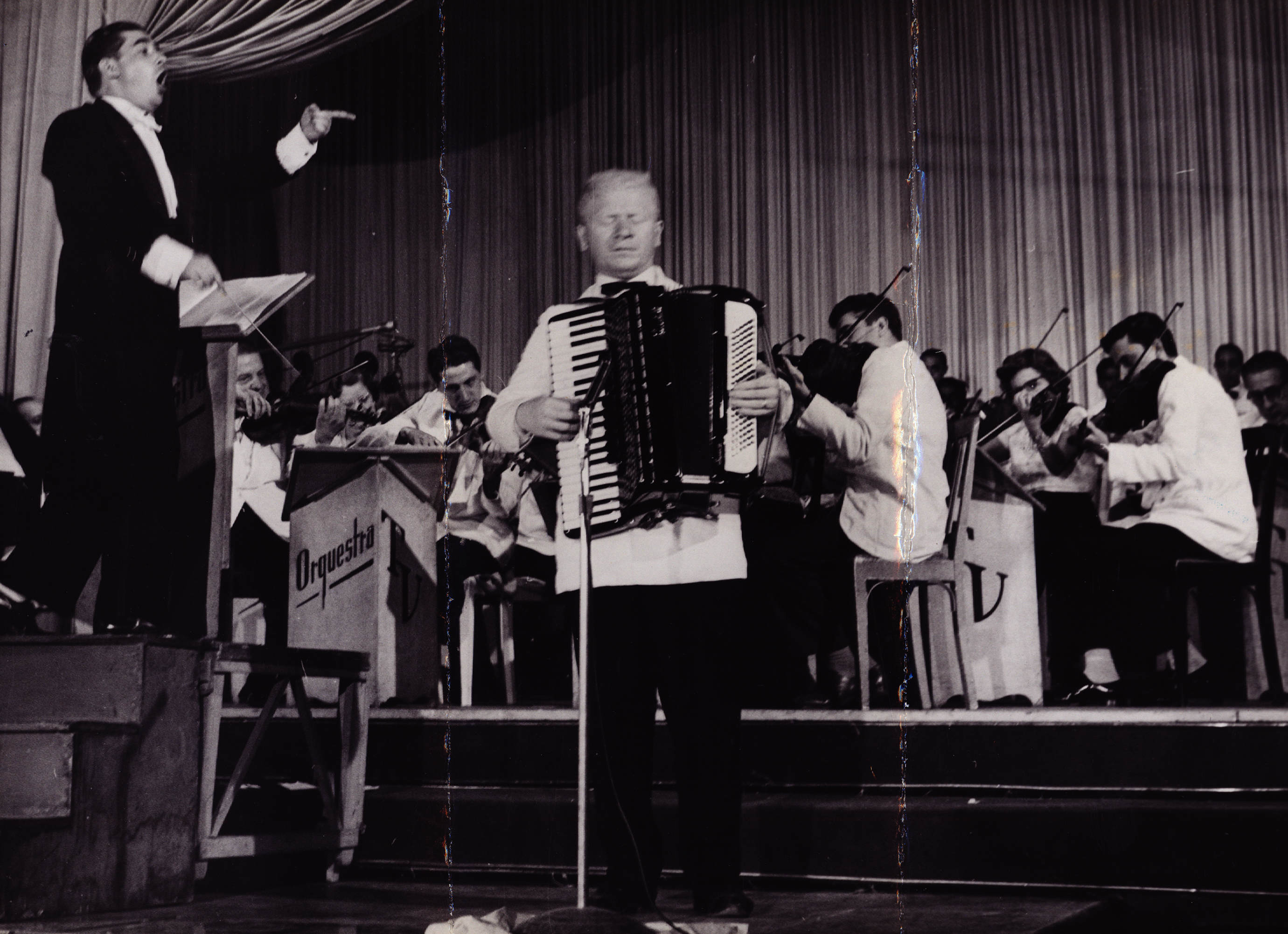
Sivuca ca 1960.

Severino Dias de Oliveira (May 26, 1930 – December 14, 2006), known professionally as Sivuca, was a Brazilian accordionist, guitarist and singer. In addition to his home state of Paraíba, Brazil, and cities Recife and Rio de Janeiro, he worked and lived in Paris, Lisbon, and New York City intermittently. He has two daughters, Wilma Da Silva and Flavia de Oliveira Barreto.

He worked with Scandinavian jazz musicians in the 1980s. His most famous songs are "João e Maria" with lyrics by Chico Buarque and "Feira de Mangaio", named after the artisan markets of northeast Brazil. He used makeshift instruments alongside conventional ones and combined traditional regional styles such as forró and choro with jazz, bossa nova, and classical music. Sivuca and Hermeto Pascoal, both versatile multi-instrumentalists with albinism, worked together and are sometimes confused with each other.

== Career ==
His professional career began in Pernambuco where he went at the age of 15, and continued in his first album with Humberto Teixeira (1950), leading to work in radio and television in Rio de Janeiro from 1955. With "Os Brasileiros" he toured Europe (1958).

=== New York 1964–1976 ===
He moved to New York City (1964–76) and worked with Miriam Makeba and Harry Belafonte among others. Archival footage of his work with Makeba can be seen in Mika Kaurismäki's documentary Mama Africa (2011). Makeba included his baião tune "(Adeus) Maria Fulô" on her 1966 album All About Miriam. He recorded with Putte Wickman (Putte Wickman & Sivuca, 1969). He also collaborated with the husband-and-wife team of Oscar Brown and Jean Pace on Joy, an off-Broadway musical show that was performed at the New Theatre in 1970, and the production's original cast recording which was released by RCA Victor that same year. In 1975, he contributed accordion and backing vocals to the track "I Do It For Your Love" on Paul Simon's Still Crazy After All These Years album.

=== 1980s ===
He recorded with Ulf Wakenius's "Guitars Unlimited" (1987) and Sylvia Vrethammar (Rio de Janeiro Blue, 1985; Rendezvous in Rio, 1995). His "Sivuca Brazilian Group" toured Scandinavia in 1990.

=== Final years ===
Sivuca was hospitalized on December 12 and died on December 14, 2006, after suffering from cancer for two-years.

== Discography ==
- Motivo Para Dancar No. 2 (Copacabana, 1957)
- Motivo Para Dancar (Copacabana, 1958)
- Ve Se Gostas (Odeon, 1959)
- Putte Wickman Meets Sivuca/Putte Wickman-Sivuca (Swedisc, 1966, 1968)
- Golden Bossa Nova Guitar (Reprise, 1968)
- Bossa Nova (Music Hall, 1968)
- Putte Wickman & Sivuca (Four Leaf Clover, 1969)
- Rendez-Vous a Rio (Barclay, 1969)
- Joy with Oscar Brown Jr., Jean Pace (RCA Victor, 1970)
- Sivuca (Vanguard, 1973)
- Live at the Village Gate (Vanguard, 1975)
- Gravado Ao Vivo (RCA, 1977)
- Forro e Frevo (Copacabana, 1980)
- Cabelo de Milho (Copacabana, 1980)
- Vou Vida Afora (Copacabana, 1981)
- Forro e Frevo Vol. 2 (Copacabana, 1982)
- Forro e Frevo Vol. 3 (Copacabana, 1983)
- Onca Caetana (Copacabana, 1983)
- Forro e Frevo Vol. 4 (Copacabana, 1984)
- Sivuca & Chiquinho Do Acordeon (Barclay, 1984)
- Chiko's Bar (Sonet, 1985)
- Som Brasil (Young, 1985)
- Let's Vamos (Sonet, 1987)
- Sanfonae e Realejo (3M, 1987)
- Um Pe No Asfalto, Um Pe Na Buraqueira (Copacabana, 1990)
- One Good Turn (Music Partner, 1992)
- Pau Doido (Kuarup, 1992)
- Enfim Solo (Kuarup, 1997)
- Cada Um Belisca Um Pouco (Biscoito Fino, 2004)
- Sivuca Sinfonico (Biscoito Fino, 2004)
- Terra Esperanca (Kuarup, 2006)
- Sivuca e Quinteto Uirapuru (Kuarup, 2010)
