= Makeba! =

Studio album by Miriam Makeba
- Released: 1968
- Genre: World music, African music
- Label: Reprise

Miriam Makeba chronology
Pata Pata (1967)	Makeba! (1968)	Keep Me in Mind (1970)

Makeba! is a 1968 album by Miriam Makeba. Liner notes were written by A. B. Spellman who classed the album the “most African of her recent releases".

== Track listing ==
1. Umoya 3:05
2. Uyadela 2:25
3. Asilimanga 1:53
4. Umquokozo 3:20
5. U-Mngoma 2:30
6. Emavungwini (Down In The Dumps) 2:09
7. Iphi Ndilela 3:40
8. Singa Madoda 2:45
9. Magwala Ndini 2:35
10. Sibongile 2:20
11. Hamba Naye 2:31
