= Pata Pata =

- Artwork for German vinyl single

Single by Miriam Makeba

from the album Pata Pata
- B-side: "The Ballad of the Sad Young Men"
- Released: 25 November 1967
- Recorded: 1967
- Length: 3:10
- Label: Reprise
- Songwriters: Miriam Makeba and Jerry Ragovoy
- Producer: Jerry Ragovoy

Miriam Makeba singles chronology
"The Click Song" (1963)	"Pata Pata" (1967)	"Malayisha" (1967)

Alternative release
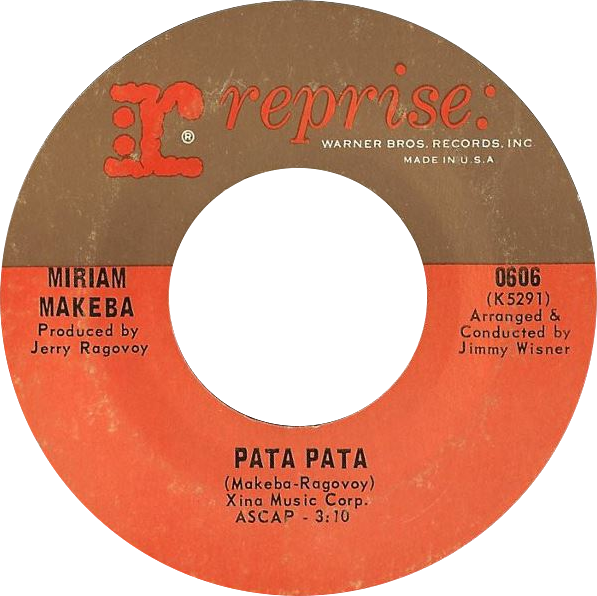
- A-side label of US vinyl single

"Pata Pata" is an Afro-pop dance song popularized internationally by South African singer Miriam Makeba. Its composition is credited to Makeba and Jerry Ragovoy. Her most popular recording of "Pata Pata" was recorded and released in the United States in 1967. The song is considered by many to be Makeba's signature hit and it has since been recorded by many artists.

== Origins ==
The song's title "Pata Pata" means "touch touch" in the Xhosa language, in which the song was originally written and sung. "Pata Pata" was also the name of a style of dance that was popular in the shebeens of Johannesburg's Townships in the mid-1950s. The dancer crouched before his partner and patted her body to the rhythm of the music as he rose up and she spun around, making hip circles. In another version of the dance,

The male dancers stand in a row with their arms extended out to the front, palms to the floor, while the women pat each in turn in a manner resembling security search body-frisking, after which the men do the same to the women.

Makeba's "Pata Pata" was not the only song inspired by the "Pata Pata" dance. Her "Pata Pata" melody was based on an instrumental "Phatha Phatha" by Shumi Ntutu and Isaac Nkosi, which was in turn based on "Noma Kumnyama" by Alson Mkhize. The popular 1956 "Ei Yow Phata Phata" by Dorothy Masuka was distinctly different from Makeba's, but in later years, Masuka made her own recording of the version made popular by Makeba. Masuka claimed that she herself had written it.

== Recordings ==
Makeba's "Pata Pata" was originally sung, recorded, and released in South Africa by Makeba's girl group The Skylarks in either 1956 or 1959.

In 1967, after establishing a successful singing career in the US, Makeba re-recorded the song with Jerry Ragovoy producing, and with an added spoken part in English. Ragovoy was then billed as the co-writer of the words and music. It was released in the United States on Makeba's studio album of the same name. It was also released as a single and peaked at #12 on 25 November 1967 on the Billboard chart. The flip side song was "Malayisha".

This version's English language content includes a description of the origin of the dance:

Pata Pata is the name of a dance [sat si pata pata] We do down Johannesburg way [sat si pata pata]

And everybody starts to move [sat si pata pata] As soon as Pata Pata starts to play - hoo [sat si pata pata]

The second spoken recitation goes:

"Every Friday and Saturday night, It's Pata Pata time. The dance keeps going all night long, til' the morning sun begins to shine."

The original (1967) version of "Pata Pata" is included on Pata Pata (released 1972), The Best of the Early Years (Miriam Makeba), a collection of 24 tracks released in 2002 by Wrasse, and the 40-track compilation Her Essential Recordings: The Empress of African Song (2006 Manteca).

In 1988, a duet version with Chayanne was recorded. It was included in the album Chayanne. In 1990, Makeba re-recorded the song for her own album Welela. Makeba also released a renovated version of the song, entitled "Pata Pata 2000", in her 2000 album Homeland.

== Reception ==
Makeba's 1967 version was successful on the Billboard Hot 100, and peaked at No. 12.

On the night she died, Miriam Makeba performed "Pata Pata" just before she collapsed on stage.

== Charts ==
Charts (1967)	Peak position
US Billboard Hot 100	12
US Billboard Hot Rhythm & Blues Singles	7
Venezuela	1
Iceland	12

== Other versions ==
- 1966: Lynn Taitt (Merritone 7" single released by Federal Records) Rocksteady Instrumental
- 1967: Porfi Jiménez recorded his version of "Pata Pata" which made it into the Record World Miami Hit Single Parade in April 1968.
- 1967 Ann-Christine to Finnish
- 1967: Wilson Simonal (Alegria Alegria Vol.1)
- 1967: Señor Soul released the song as a single, Double Shot 122. It also appears on the album, Señor Soul Plays Funky Favorites.
- 1968: Los Rockin Devils (Pata-Pata Psicodelico Días)
- 1968: El Gran Combo de Puerto Rico ("Pata Pata Jala Jala Boogaloo" album)
- 1968: The Supremes ("T.C.B." soundtrack album and TV broadcast)
- 1968: Braňo Hronec Orchestra (TV music film "Desať a štvrť")
- 1969: Tito Puente and His Orchestra ("The King Tito Puente / El Rey Tito Puente" album)
- 1980: Osibisa (Mystic Energy album)
- 1980: Sylvie Vartan (French singer of Bulgarian origin: "Tape Tape" single from the album Bienvenue Solitude)
- 1981: Prima Vera (Den 5te album)
- 1985: Otto Waalkes in his Film Debut (Otto – der Film)
- 1988: Chayanne feat. Miriam Makeba (included in Chayanne II)
- 1989: Triple & Touch played this song live on tour with Björn Afzelius 1989 at Hovdala slott
- 1997: Daúde
- 1998: Coumba Gawlo
- 1998: El General (Spanglish version)
- 1999: Manu Dibango
- 2000: Thalía (recorded it for her album Arrasando)
- 2001: The Skatalites
- 2001: Yamboo (The group used the chorus for their song's refrain)
- 2002: Blue Monster & Bikki (The album was officially released 8 years later in 2010)
- 2002: Jonathan Butler (recorded a rendition of this song from his album Surrender)
- 2004: Helmut Lotti
- 2005: Bakithi Kumalo (instrumental version on his album This is me)
- 2006: Tony Esposito
- 2006: Dan Zanes on his album Catch That Train!
- 2007: African Jazz Pioneers
- 2010: Blue Monster & Bikki (Originally recorded in 2002, it took 8 years to be officially released)
- 2010: DJ Happy Vibes, Lira
- 2011: Arielle Dombasle feat. Mokobé (released on her album Diva Latina)
- 2011: African Ladies (cover version for video game Just Dance 3 on Wii, Xbox 360, and PlayStation 3)
- 2011: Milk & Sugar feat. Miriam Makeba (made a remix with Makeba),
- 2012: Lorraine Klaasen (A Tribute to Miriam Makeba)
- 2015: Playing for Change
- 2016: Pink Martini
- The song has also been recorded by Angélique Kidjo and Howard Carpendale.
- 2022: Sun-El Musician and Msaki version
- 2022: Herb Alpert (instrumental version on his album Sunny Side of the Street)
- 2024: The global pop group Now United covered the song.

== Usage ==
- The song was used in Season 1 of Veronica Mars.
- In 2009, Honda used the song in a television commercial for their 2010 Accord Crosstour.
- The song was used in the 2012 short film Hazel directed by Tamer Ruggli.
- The song was used in an episode of Season 2 of the HBO television series The White Lotus.
- The song was used in the 2026 movie Project Hail Mary.
- The song was featured in the 2026 film Practical Magic 2.
- In 2026 the song was used as background music in a British Gas advertising campaign.
