= The Magic of Makeba =

Studio album by Miriam Makeba
- Released: 1965
- Studio: RCA Studio A, New York City
- Genre: World music, African music
- Label: RCA Victor
- Producer: Jim Foglesong

Miriam Makeba chronology
An Evening with Belafonte/Makeba (1965)	The Magic of Makeba (1965)	The Magnificent Miriam Makeba (1966)

The Magic of Makeba is the seventh album by Miriam Makeba released in 1965 by RCA Victor. The album saw Makeba branching out into new material arranged by conductor Sid Bass, but it gained mixed reception and was her final album for RCA Victor.

== Track listing ==
1. "When I've Passed On" 4:00
2. "Sunrise, Sunset" 2:40
3. "Autumn Song" 2:35
4. "You Are in Love" 3:33
5. "Seven Good Years" 3:09
6. "Sleep Tight" 3:31
7. "Ask The Rising Sun" 2:54
8. "Oxgam" 2:00
9. "Where Does It Lead" 2:36
10. "Muntu (Lullaby)" 4:10
11. "Erev Shel Shoshanim" 2:18
12. "Oh So Alone" 3:50

== Personnel ==
- Sid Bass- arranger, conductor
- Mickey Crofford - engineer
- Jim Marshall - photography
