= The Magnificent Miriam Makeba =

Studio album by Miriam Makeba
- Released: 1966
- Genre: World music, African music
- Label: Mercury
- Producer: Luchi DeJesus

Miriam Makeba chronology
The Magic of Makeba (1965)	The Magnificent Miriam Makeba (1966)	All About Miriam (1966)

Professional ratings
Review scores
Source	Rating
AllMusic	4.5/5 stars

The Magnificent Miriam Makeba is a 1966 album by Miriam Makeba (LP Mercury 134016). It was her first album after moving from RCA Victor to Mercury.

== Track listing ==
1. Mr. Man
2. Imagine Me
3. La Bushe (Congo Bushe)
4. Where Are You Going
5. Charlie (Oh Mama)
6. West Wind
7. A Piece of Ground
8. That's How It Goes (Ntsizwa)
9. My Love Is Young
10. Oh, Tell Me My Mother (Wa Thint'a Madoda)
11. I'm in Love with Spring
12. Akana Nkomo
