= A Promise (Miriam Makeba album) =

Studio album by Miriam Makeba
- Released: 1974
- Studio: Les Disques Esperance
- Genre: World music, African music
- Producer: Caiphus Semenya

Miriam Makeba chronology
| Keep Me in Mind (1970) | A Promise (1974) | Miriam Makeba & Bongi (1975) |

Professional ratings
Review scores
| Source | Rating |
|---|---|
| The Encyclopedia of Popular Music | 3/5 stars |

A Promise is a 1974 album by Miriam Makeba. David Axelrod was responsible for the string arrangements.

== Track listing ==
All tracks composed by Angela Makeba and Caiphus Semenya; except where indicated

1. "Hauteng" 4:50
2. "Mama Ndiyalila" 3:26
3. "We Got to Make It" 4:10
4. "Mama" 4:22
5. "Promise" 4:44
6. "Mo Lou Yame" (Traditional) 4:04
7. "Laguine Guine" (Angela Makeba, Caiphus Semenya, Sekou Kanté) 3:15
8. "Samba" 5:05
9. "Quit It" (Traditional) 4:00
