= Comme une symphonie d'amour =

Studio album by Miriam Makeba
- Released: 1979
- Studio: Studio 10 (Paris)
- Genre: African music
- Label: Sonodisc
- Producer: Philemon Hou

Miriam Makeba chronology
| Country Girl (1975) | Comme une symphonie d'amour (1979) | Sangoma (1988) |

Comme une symphonie d'amour is a 1979 album by South African singer Miriam Makeba. The album has been published in several editions, including one by Gallo Records in 2006. Some editions are entitled Malaisha.

== Track listing ==
1. "Comme une symphonie d'amour" (Jérôme Camilly, Pierre Jeantet) – 3:45
2. "Malaisha (Bring the Axe)" (Rajkama) – 3:40
3. "Iyaguduza" (Miriam Makeba) – 5:38
4. "Chicken (Kikirikiki)" (Pai) – 4:22
5. "Ndibanga Hamba" (Miriam Makeba) – 3:25
6. "Sabelani" (Philemon Hou) – 4:46
7. "Ngewundini" (Miriam Makeba) – 4:32
8. "African Convention" (Hugh Masekela) – 5:05
9. "Murtala" (Bongi Makeba) – 6:20

== Personnel ==
- Miriam Makeba – vocals
- Achille Ango, Jules Kamga, Krishna Yarbrough – guitar
- Jean-Yves Messan, Kim Yarbrough – bass
- Wally Badarou – piano
- Denis Hekimian, Nanou – drums
- Mam Houari, Patrick Bourgoin – saxophone
- Hugh Masekela – trumpet
- Hugh Masekela, Miriam Makeba, Philemon Hou – chorus
