= The Many Voices of Miriam Makeba =

Studio album by Miriam Makeba
- Released: 1962
- Genre: World music; African music
- Label: Kapp
- Producer: Bob Bollard

Miriam Makeba chronology
Miriam Makeba (1960)	The Many Voices of Miriam Makeba (1962)	The World of Miriam Makeba (1963)

Professional ratings
Review scores
Source	Rating
AllMusic	3/5 stars

The Many Voices of Miriam Makeba is a 1962 studio album of Miriam Makeba (LP Kapp KL1274).

== Track listing ==
All tracks composed by Miriam Makeba; except where indicated

1. "Kilimanjaro (Hunting Song and Boot Dance)" (Mackay Davashe, Tom Glazer) – 2:48
2. "Zenizenabo (Courage Song for Warriors)" – 1:17
3. "Ntjilo Ntjilo (Lullaby to a Child about a Little Canary)" – 2:23
4. "Umqokozo (Children's game song About a new red dress)" – 2:05
5. "Ngola Kurila (A Woman Pacifies Her Hungry Child. There Is Nothing to Eat)" – 3:13
6. "Thanayi (Story song about a girl named Thanayi)" – 3:08
7. "Liwa Wechi (Congolese Lament. The Wife Bids Her Husband Farewell As He Leaves For The Mines)" (Franco Luambo) – 2:49
8. "Nagula (Witch Doctor Song)" – 1:36
9. "Carnival": (Theme from the Brazilian Movie Black Orpheus)(Luiz Bonfá) – 2:28
10. "Night Must Fall (American)" (Bob Gordon, Priscilla Eaves) – 1:55
11. "Love Tastes Like Strawberries (West Indian Ballad)" (Alma M. Saunders, B.J. Solomon) – 3:20
12. "Can't Cross Over (West Indian Calypso)" (Irving Burgie) – 3:21

== Personnel ==
- Miriam Makeba – vocals
- Ernie Calabria, Jack Check – vocals
- Norman Keenan – bass guitar
- Hugh Masekela – trumpet
- Daniel Barrajanos, Julio Collazo, Michael Alexander, Ralph MacDonald, Rod Clavery – percussion
- Ralph Hunter – conductor
