= Sangoma (Miriam Makeba album) =

Studio album by Miriam Makeba
- Released: 1988
- Genre: South African music
- Label: Warner Bros.
- Producer: Russ Titelman

Miriam Makeba chronology
| Comme une symphonie d'amour (1979) | Sangoma (1988) | Welela (1989) |

Professional ratings
Review scores
| Source | Rating |
|---|---|
| The Encyclopedia of Popular Music | 4/5 stars |
| New Musical Express | 9/10 |

Sangoma is an album by the South African musician Miriam Makeba, released in 1988. It was a comeback album after a long pause since Comme une symphonie d'amour, in 1979, spurred by touring with Paul Simon, who was promoting his album Graceland. The album's chants were taught to Makeba by her mother. While recording this album she was in a wheelchair due to fracturing her leg while on the Graceland tour.

== Track listing ==
1. "Emabhaceni" – 2:38
2. "Baxabene Oxamu" – 2:12
3. "Ngalala Phantsi" – 2:29
4. "Ihoyiya" – 1:27
5. "Kulo Nyaka" – 2:17
6. "Baya Jabula" – 2:22
7. "Mabhongo" – 1:22
8. "Ingwemabala" – 1:54
9. "Mosadi Ku Rima" – 3:10
10. "Angilalanga" – 2:16
11. "Ungakanani" – 1:25
12. "Ngiya Khuyeka" – 1:36
13. "Nyankwabe" – 1:56
14. "Sabumoya" – 1:47
15. "Congo" – 2:22
16. "Nginani Na" – 2:36
17. "Umam' Uyajabula" – 2:02
18. "Nyamuthla" – 2:29
19. "Icala" – 3:11

== Personnel ==
- Miriam Makeba – lead and backing vocals
- Hugh Masekela – music consultant, additional percussion, backing vocals
- Jason Miles – synthesizer programming
- Tony Cedras – keyboards
- Okyerema Asante – percussion
- Zenzi Lee, Russ Titelman – additional percussion
- Brenda Fassie, Linda Bottoman-Tshabalala – backing vocals

Technical

- Alexandra Saraspe-Conomos – assistant producer
- William Coupon – cover photography
