= Tanisha C. Ford =

American scholar and historian (born 1979)

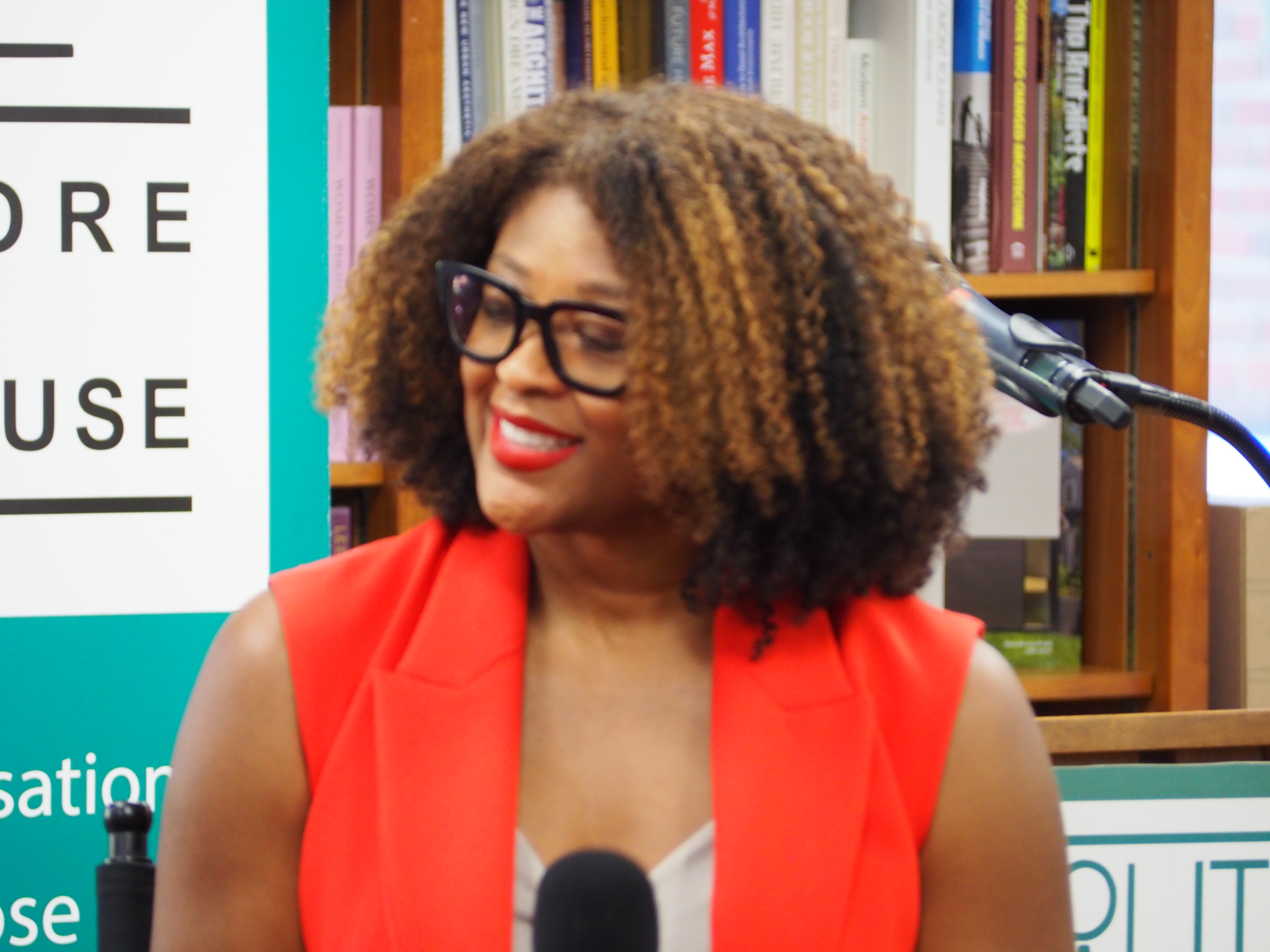
Tanisha Ford

Tanisha C. Ford (born c. 1980) is an American scholar, historian, and author. She is professor in the History Department at the Graduate Center at The City University of New York. Ford is an expert on black historical fashion and culture. She was named of the 100 most influential African Americans by The Root. She additionally writes for The Atlantic, and contributed to The New York Times, The Root, Elle.com, and Aperture.

== Career ==
Her book Liberated Threads: Black Women, Style, and the Global Politics of Soul won the 2016 Liberty Legacy Foundation Award for Best Book on Civil Rights History from the Organization of American Historians.

== Selected works ==
- Ford, Tanisha (October 24, 2023). Our Secret Society. Amistad. ISBN 978-0-06-311571-2.
- Ford, Tanisha C.; Brathwaite, Kwame; Willis, Deborah (2019). Kwame Brathwaite: Black is Beautiful. New York: Aperture. ISBN 978-1-59711-443-1. OCLC 1050337685.
- Ford, Tanisha C. (2019). Dressed in Dreams: A Black Girl's Love Letter to the Power of Fashion. New York: St. Martin's Press. ISBN 978-1-250-17353-9. OCLC 1048934763.
- Ford, Tanisha C. (2015). Liberated Threads: Black Women, Style, and the Global Politics of Soul. Chapel Hill, North Carolina: The University of North Carolina Press. ISBN 978-1-4696-2517-1. OCLC 921988661.
