= Eyes on Tomorrow =

Studio album by Miriam Makeba
- Released: 11 June 1991
- Genre: African music
- Label: Gallo

Miriam Makeba chronology
Welela (1990)	Eyes on Tomorrow (1991)	Africa (1991)

Eyes on Tomorrow is an album by South African singer Miriam Makeba, released in 1991. It was recorded in South Africa. Dizzy Gillespie guested on the album.

== Critical reception ==
Professional ratings
Review scores
Source	Rating
AllMusic	3/5 stars
Robert Christgau	C

The Washington Post wrote that "what stands out most is Makeba's sweet, supple, stirring voice and an overriding sense that, though she may be home, the struggle for self-rule and unification goes on."

== Track listing ==
1. "I Still Long for You" – 4:43
2. "Eyes on Tomorrow" – 4:05
3. "Don't Break My Heart" (Paolo Conte) – 4:35 sung originally by Mia Martini
4. "Thina Sizonqoba" – 4:16
5. "We Speak Peace" – 5:08
6. "Thulasizwe/I Shall Be Released" – 3:46
7. "Vukani" – 5:06
8. "Birds" – 3:11
9. "Live the Future" – 5:28
