= Dorothy Masuka =

South African jazz singer (1935–2019)

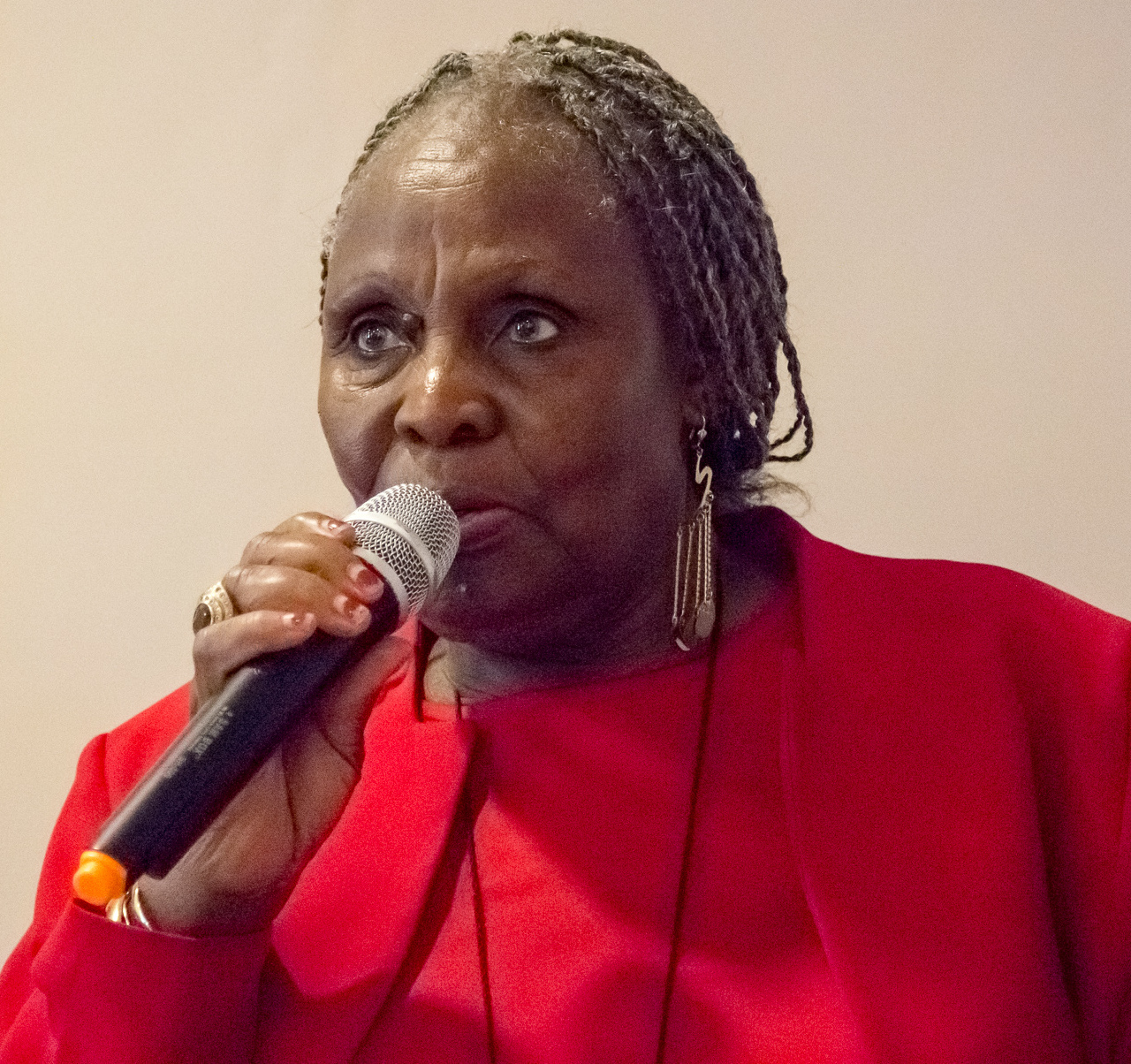
- Masuka in 2015

Background information
- Born: 3 September 1935; Bulawayo, Southern Rhodesia (now Zimbabwe) born to a South African woman and a Zambian man.
- Origin: Zimbabwe
- Died: 23 February 2019 (aged 83); Johannesburg, South Africa
- Occupation: Singer-songwriter
- Years active: 1951–2019
- Website: https://www.sahistory.org.za/people/dorothy-masuka

Dorothy Masuka (3 September 1935 – 23 February 2019) was a Zimbabwe-born South African jazz singer.

== Music career ==
Masuka's music was popular in South Africa throughout the 1950s, but when her songs became more serious, the government began questioning her. Her song "Dr. Malan," mentioning difficult laws, was banned and in 1961 she sang a song for Patrice Lumumba, which led to her exile. This exile lasted 31 years in total during which she lived in Zambia and worked as a flight attendant. She returned to Zimbabwe in 1980 after independence.

In August 2011, Dorothy Masuka and Mfundi Vundla, creator of the popular South African soap opera Generations, confirmed plans to make a film of Masuka's life. The film would concentrate on the years 1952 to 1957.

On 27 April 2017 she featured in the concert "The Jazz Epistles featuring Abdullah Ibrahim & Ekaya," at The Town Hall, New York City, opening the show and delivering "one passionate performance after another, warming up and winning over the crowd".

Dorothy Masuka died in Johannesburg on 23 February 2019, at the age of 83.
