= Homeland (Miriam Makeba album) =

2000 album by South African singer Miriam Makeba

Studio album by Miriam Makeba
- Released: 25 April 2000
- Recorded: 2000
- Genre: African music
- Label: Putumayo

Miriam Makeba chronology
Sing Me a Song (1993)	Homeland (2000)	Live at Berns Salonger, Stockholm, Sweden, 1966 (2003)

Professional ratings
Review scores
Source	Rating
Encyclopedia of Popular Music	4/5 stars

Homeland is the final studio album by South African singer Miriam Makeba. It was released in 2000 on CD by world music label Putumayo. It includes a duet starring Makeba and Zenzi Lee in a renovated version of Makeba's trademark hit song "Pata Pata" (1967), entitled "Pata Pata 2000". Congolese pop star Lokua Kanza also contributed to this album both as a songwriter (for "Homeland" and "Lindelani") and as a singer ("Lindelani").

Both the title-track and the whole record are largely conceived as a celebration of the end of apartheid. The record was released a few days before the South African Freedom Day on 27 April 2000. The album was nominated for a Grammy Award in the Best World Music Album category.

== Track listing ==
1. "Masakhane" – 4:42
2. "Amaliya" – 3:12
3. "Pata Pata 2000" – 3:49
4. "'Cause We Live for Love" – 4:35
5. "Liwa Wechi" – 3:30
6. "Lindelani" – 3:14
7. "Homeland" – 4:06
8. "Umhome" – 5:09
9. "Africa Is Where My Heart Lies" – 4:39
10. "In Time" – 5:01
