= Bongi Makeba =

South African musician (1950–1985)

- Makeba on the cover of her album Blow On Wind
- Born: Angela Sibongile Makeba; 20 December 1950; South Africa
- Died: 17 March 1985 (aged 34)
- Burial place: Conakry, Guinea
- Occupations: Singer, songwriter
- Children: 3
- Parent(s): Miriam Makeba and James Kubay

Bongi Makeba (20 December 1950 – 17 March 1985) was a South African singer-songwriter. She was the only child of singer Miriam Makeba with her first husband, James Kubay.

== Biography ==
Angela Sibongile Makeba was born in South Africa in 1950, when her mother was 18 years old. The name Bongi is a shortened version of her middle name Sibongile, which means "we are grateful". In 1959, her mother's career took her to New York, where she remained in exile after being barred from returning to South Africa, and in 1960 was joined by Bongi, who stayed with friends while her mother toured the world.

Bongi's mother introduced her as a performer during a 1967 concert at New York's Philharmonic Hall. In 1967, she and Judy White, daughter of Josh White, signed to Buddha Records as "Bongi and Judy", their first release being "Runnin' Out" and "Let's Get Together". At the age of 17, Makeba met her American husband Harold Nelson Lee, with whom in the early to mid-1970s she made two 7" records as "Bongi and Nelson", featuring two soul tracks arranged by George Butcher: "That's the Kind of Love" backed by "I Was So Glad" (France: Syliphone SYL 533), and "Everything, For My Love" with "Do You Remember, Malcolm?" (France: Syliphone SYL 532). She recorded only one solo album, Bongi Makeba, Blow On Wind (pläne-records), in 1980. Some of her songs could be heard years later in her mother's repertoire. Two of them, "Malcolm X" (1972) and "Lumumba" (1970), extol assassinated black leaders. Her mother commissioned a song from Makeba for a celebration of Mozambique's independence in 1975; she wrote "A Luta Continua" (The Struggle Continues), the same title as a common phrase used in this movement, with collaborator Bill Salter.

Makeba had three children: Nelson Lumumba Lee, born in 1968 and named for African independence activists Nelson Mandela and Patrice Lumumba; Zenzi Monique Lee (born 1971), and a son, Themba, who died as a young child. Soon after the birth of Makeba's first child, her mother married Stokely Carmichael, which put a considerable strain on her life in the United States, and the couple moved to Guinea, where Makeba joined them with her children. They lived together for a period, although Themba's death, which occurred while Makeba was travelling, strained her relationship with her mother. The family were supported by that of Guinean president Sekou Touré, who had befriended Miriam Makeba and Carmichael, until Touré's death in 1984. The following year, a pregnant Makeba went into premature labour, and died on 17 March 1985, aged 34, of complications after losing the unborn child. She was buried in Conakry.

== Discography ==
- Blow On Wind (1980; Germany: pläne – 88234)
- Miriam Makeba & Bongi (1975; LP with Miriam Makeba; Guinea: Editions Syliphone Conakry SLP 48)
