= The Click Song =

Traditional song of the Xhosa people

"Qongqothwane", also known as "The Click Song" by Anglophones, is a traditional song of the Xhosa people of South Africa. Click consonants from the Xhosa language are characteristic of the song as an extended vocal technique. The Xhosa title translates to "knocking beetle", which is a name for various species of darkling beetles colloquially known as "tok tokkie" due to their method of attracting mates that include distinctive knocking sounds from tapping on the ground. In Xhosa oral tradition, these beetles guide lost children to home. The song compares a knocking beetle and an igqirha, which is a traditional South African healer or diviner who can preside over marriage rites, vows, and incantations. Due to this, the song is sung at weddings to bring good fortune in guiding couples to new lives.

== History ==
The song was written, originally performed, and popularized across Africa by The Manhattan Brothers. They later found South African singer Miriam Makeba. Having Xhosa as her native language, she sang with them throughout the 1940s. Due to Miriam's interpretations of Xhosan melodic syncopations that counterpointed a calypso bassline, the song gained popularity with White American demographics that were already familiar with calypso. In her discography, the song appears in several versions, with the titles including both "Qongqothwane" and "The Click Song".

== Lyrics ==
Xhosa
Igqirha lendlela nguqongqothwane
Sel' eqabel' egqith' apha nguqongqothwane

Phonetic transcription
[í.ᶢǃi̤.xa. lé.ⁿd̥ɮe̤.la. nɡ̊ǘ.ᵏǃʼó.ᵑǃo̤.tʰʷa.ne]
[se.l e.ᵏǃʼa.ɓe.l e.ᶢǃï.tʰ a.pʰa. nɡ̊ǘ.ᵏǃʼó.ᵑǃo̤.tʰʷa.ne]

English translation
A diviner of the roadways is the knock-knock beetle,
Already it climbs up and passes by here, it's the knock-knock beetle.

== Other versions ==
- Hugh Masekela included the song in his 1962 recording, Trumpet Africaine.
- Four Jacks and a Jill released versions of the song on 1966 album Jimmy Come Lately and again on 2002 album Timothy And Other Hits.
- Cher released a version of the song as the lead single of her 1968 album, Backstage. However, audience reception was not always positive, since "The Click Song" did not have any click consonants that portray the Xhosa language.
- The Cool Crooners of Bulawayo released a version of the song on their 2006 album, Isatilo.
- Siki Jo-An Qwazi, also known as the African Queen, performed a version of the song in 2019 on the third season of The Voice South Africa. She later achieved third place in the competition.
- Pilani Bubu released a soul version of the song on her 2022 album, Folklore: Chapter 1.
