= Miriam Makeba =

South African singer and activist (1932–2008)

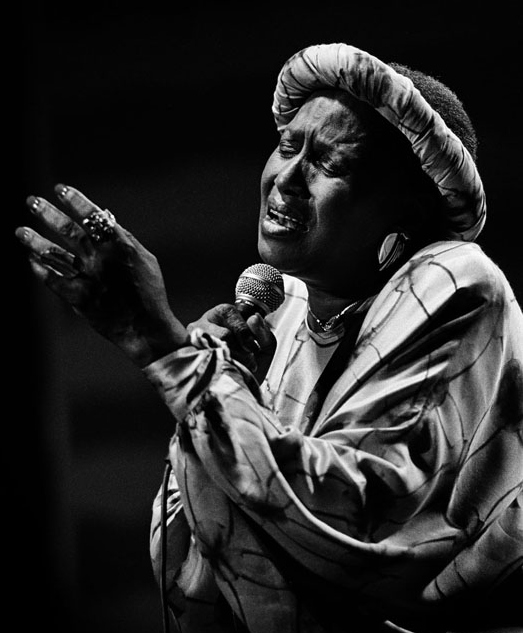
- Makeba during a performance in 1991
- Born: Zenzile Miriam Makeba; 4 March 1932; Prospect Township, Johannesburg, Union of South Africa
- Died: 9 November 2008 (aged 76); Castel Volturno, Italy
- Other name: Mama Africa
- Occupations: Singer; songwriter; actress; civil rights activist
- Years active: 1953–2008
- Children: Bongi Makeba
- Musical career
- Genres: Marabi; world; Afropop; jazz; township
- Works: Miriam Makeba discography
- Labels: Manteca; Strut; RCA Victor; Mercury; Kapp; Collectables; Suave; Warner Bros.; Reprise; PolyGram; Drg; Stern's Africa; Kaz; Sonodisc
- Formerly of: Cuban Brothers; Manhattan Brothers; The Skylarks
- Website: www.miriammakeba.co.za

Zenzile Miriam Makeba (/məˈkeɪbə/ mə-KAY-bə, Xhosa: [máˈkʼêːɓà̤]; 4 March 1932 – 9 November 2008), nicknamed Mama Africa, was a South African singer, songwriter, actress, and civil rights activist. Associated with musical genres including Afropop, jazz, and world music, she was an advocate against apartheid and white-minority government in South Africa.

Born in Johannesburg to Swazi and Xhosa parents, Makeba was forced to find employment as a child after the death of her father. She had a brief and allegedly abusive first marriage at the age of 17, gave birth to her only child in 1950, and survived breast cancer. Her vocal talent had been recognized when she was a child, and she began singing professionally in the 1950s, with the Cuban Brothers, the Manhattan Brothers, and an all-woman group, the Skylarks, performing a mixture of jazz, traditional African melodies, and Western popular music. In 1959, Makeba had a brief role in the anti-apartheid film Come Back, Africa, which brought her international attention, and led to her performing in Venice, London, and New York City. In London, she met the American singer Harry Belafonte, who became a mentor and colleague. She moved to New York City, where she became immediately popular, and recorded her first solo album in 1960. Her attempt to return to South Africa that year for her mother's funeral was prevented by the country's government.

Makeba's career flourished in the United States, and she released several albums and songs, her most popular being "Pata Pata" (1967). Along with Belafonte, she received a Grammy Award for Best Folk Recording for their 1965 album An Evening with Belafonte/Makeba. She testified against the South African government at the United Nations and became involved in the civil rights movement. She married Stokely Carmichael, a leader of the Black Panther Party, in 1968, and consequently lost support among white Americans. Her visa was revoked by the US government when she was travelling abroad, forcing her and Carmichael to relocate to Guinea. She continued to perform, mostly in African countries, including at several independence celebrations. She began to write and perform music more explicitly critical of apartheid; the 1977 song "Soweto Blues", written by her former husband Hugh Masekela, was about the Soweto uprising. After apartheid was dismantled in 1990, Makeba returned to South Africa. She continued recording and performing, including a 1991 album with Nina Simone and Dizzy Gillespie, and appeared in the 1992 film Sarafina!. She was named an FAO Goodwill Ambassador in 1999, and campaigned for humanitarian causes. She died of a heart attack during a 2008 concert in Italy.

Makeba was among the first African musicians to receive worldwide recognition. She brought African music to a Western audience, and popularized the world music and Afropop genres. Despite her cosmopolitan background, she was frequently viewed by Western audiences as an embodiment of Africa: she was also seen as a style icon in both South Africa and the West. Makeba made popular several songs critical of apartheid, and became a symbol of opposition to the system, particularly after her right to return was revoked. Upon her death, former South African President Nelson Mandela said that "her music inspired a powerful sense of hope in all of us."

== Early years ==
=== Childhood and family ===
Zenzile Miriam Makeba was born on 4 March 1932 in the black township of Prospect, near Johannesburg, as the only child of her father and the sixth of her mother. Her Xhosa father, Caswell Makeba, was a teacher; he died when she was six years old. Her Swazi mother, Christina Makeba, was a domestic worker; she had previously separated from her first husband and met and married Caswell shortly afterwards. Makeba later said that before she was conceived, her mother had been warned that any future pregnancy could be fatal. Neither Miriam nor her mother seemed likely to survive after a difficult labour and delivery. Miriam's grandmother, who attended the birth, often muttered u z enz ile, a Xhosa word that means "you brought this on yourself", to Miriam's mother during her recovery, which inspired her to give her daughter the name "Zenzile".

When Makeba was eighteen days old, her mother was arrested and sentenced to a six-month prison term for selling umqombothi, a homemade beer brewed from malt and cornmeal. The family could not afford the small fine required to avoid a jail term, and Miriam spent the first six months of her life in jail. (Note: South Africa had complex alcohol regulations which prohibited black South Africans from brewing alcohol, or from consuming it anywhere except beer halls run by local governments. Illegal brewing and consumption was common. The restrictions on consumption were largely removed in the 1960s; the state monopoly on production remained.) By the time of her mother's release from prison, Makeba's father, who had been having difficulty finding work as a teacher, had obtained a job as a clerk at the Shell Oil Company in Nelspruit (now Mbombela) and the family moved along with him accordingly. After her father's death she moved to the house of her maternal grandmother in Riverside Township outside of Pretoria, along with her siblings and cousins, while her mother worked for white families in Johannesburg to support the family.

As a child, Makeba sang in the choir of Kilnerton Training Institution in Pretoria, an all-black Methodist primary school that she attended for eight years. Her talent for singing earned her praise at school. Makeba was baptised and sang in church choirs, in English, Xhosa, Sotho, and Zulu; she later said that she learned to sing in English before she could speak the language.

Makeba was influenced by her family's musical tastes; her mother played several traditional instruments, and her elder brother collected records, including those of Duke Ellington and Ella Fitzgerald, and taught Makeba songs. Her father played the piano and sang in a group called The Mississippi 12, and his musical inclination was later a factor in Makeba's family accepting what was seen as a risqué choice of career.

Makeba left school to support her family and first worked as a live-in nanny for a Greek family in the Johannesberg suburb of Waverley for three months. The mother stopped paying her and went to the police to accuse her of stealing, so Makeba fled back to her grandmother's home in Riverside. Around that time Makeba's mother began the process of becoming a sangoma or traditional healer, which required her to go back to her ancestral homeland in Eswatini (then Swaziland). Makeba stayed behind working as a launderer for expatriate workers to support her family.

In 1949, Makeba married James Kubay, a policeman in training, with whom she had her only child, Sibongile "Bongi" Makeba, in 1950. Makeba was then diagnosed with breast cancer, and her husband, who was said to have beaten her, left her shortly afterwards, after a two-year marriage. A decade later she overcame cervical cancer via a hysterectomy.

=== Early career ===
Makeba began her professional musical career with the Cuban Brothers, a South African all-male close harmony group, with whom she sang covers of popular American songs. Soon afterwards, at the age of 21, she joined a jazz group, the Manhattan Brothers, who sang a mixture of South African songs and pieces from popular African-American groups. Makeba was the only woman in the group. With the Manhattan Brothers she recorded her first hit, "Lakutshn, Ilanga", in 1953, and developed a national reputation as a musician. In 1956 she joined a new all-woman group, the Skylarks, singing a blend of jazz and traditional South African melodies. Formed by Gallotone Records, the group was also known as the Sunbeams. Makeba sang with the Skylarks when the Manhattan Brothers were travelling abroad; later, she also travelled with the Manhattan Brothers. In the Skylarks, Makeba sang alongside Rhodesian-born musician Dorothy Masuka, whose music Makeba had followed, along with that of Dolly Rathebe. Several of the Skylarks' pieces from this period became popular; the music historian Rob Allingham later described the group as "real trendsetters, with harmonisation that had never been heard before." Makeba received no royalties from her work with the Skylarks.

While performing with the Manhattan Brothers in 1955, Makeba met Nelson Mandela, then a young lawyer; he later remembered the meeting, and that he felt that the girl he met "was going to be someone." With the Manhattan Brothers, Makeba recorded "Lakutshona Ilanga", (Note: The song is also referred to as "Lakutshn Ilanga".) written by Mackay Davashe. The song's popularity prompted requests for an English version, and in 1956, Gallotone Records released "Lovely Lies", Makeba's first solo success and first recording in English. However, the Xhosa lyric about a man looking for his beloved in jails and hospitals was replaced with the unrelated and innocuous line "You tell such lovely lies with your two lovely eyes" in the English version. The piece became the first South African record to chart on the United States Billboard Top 100. In 1957, Makeba was featured on the cover of Drum magazine.

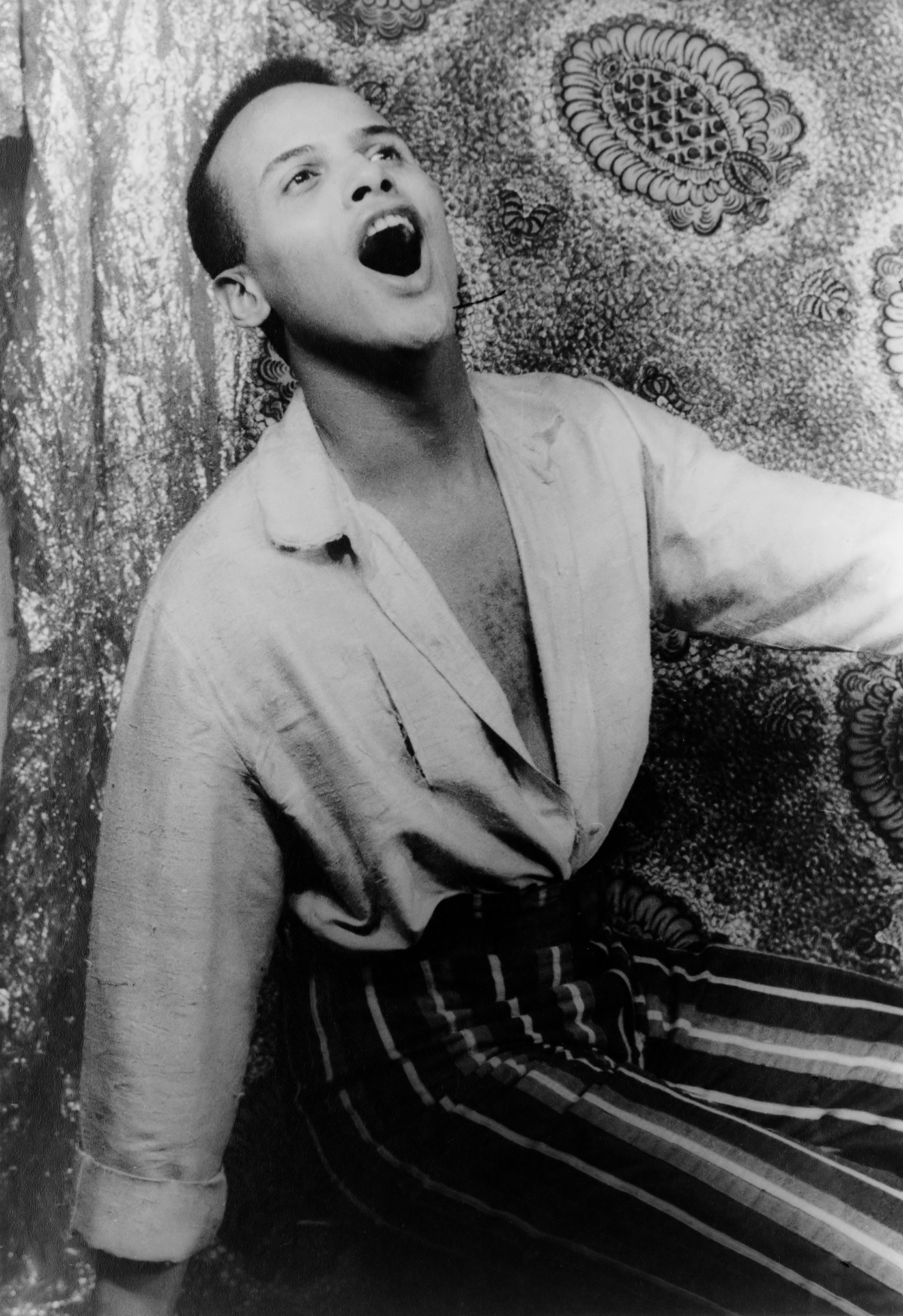
American singer Harry Belafonte met Makeba in London and adopted her as his protégée.

In 1959, Makeba sang the lead female role in the Broadway-inspired South African jazz opera King Kong; among those in the cast was the musician Hugh Masekela. The musical was performed to racially integrated audiences, raising her profile among white South Africans. Also in 1959, she had a short guest appearance in Come Back, Africa, an anti-apartheid film produced and directed by the American independent filmmaker Lionel Rogosin. Rogosin cast her after seeing her on stage in the African Jazz and Variety show, on which Makeba was a performer for 18 months. The film blended elements of documentary and fiction and had to be filmed in secret as the government was expected to be hostile to it. Makeba appeared on stage, and sang two songs: her appearance lasted four minutes. The cameo made an enormous impression on viewers, and Rogosin organised a visa for her to attend the premiere of the film at the twenty-fourth Venice Film Festival in Italy, where the film won the prestigious Critics' Choice Award. Makeba's presence has been described as crucial to the film, as an emblem of cosmopolitan black identity that also connected with working-class black people due to the dialogue being in Zulu.

Makeba's role in Come Back, Africa brought her international recognition and she travelled to London and New York to perform. In London she met the American singer Harry Belafonte, who became her mentor, helping her with her first solo recordings. These included "Pata Pata", (Note: Though Makeba is generally credited with writing this song, scholars have questioned this claim, instead attributing the piece to Dorothy Masuka.) which would be released many years later, and a version of the traditional Xhosa song "Qongqothwane", which she had first performed with the Skylarks. Though "Pata Pata"—described by Musician magazine as a "groundbreaking Afropop gem"—became her most famous song, Makeba described it as "one of my most insignificant songs". While in England, she married Sonny Pillay, (Note: Makeba's second husband has also been referred to as "Shunna Pillay".) a South African ballad singer of Indian descent; they divorced within a few months.

Makeba then moved to New York, making her US music debut on 1 November 1959 on The Steve Allen Show in Los Angeles for a television audience of 60 million. Her New York debut at the Village Vanguard occurred soon after; she sang in Xhosa and Zulu, and performed a Yiddish folk song. Her audience at this concert included Miles Davis and Duke Ellington; her performance received strongly positive reviews from critics. She first came to popular and critical attention in jazz clubs, after which her reputation grew rapidly. Belafonte, who had helped Makeba with her move to the US, handled the logistics for her first performances. When she first moved to the US, Makeba lived in Greenwich Village, along with other musicians and actors. As was common in her profession, she experienced some financial insecurity, and worked as a babysitter for a period.

== Exile ==
=== United States ===
==== Breakthrough ====
I always wanted to leave home. I never knew they were going to stop me from coming back. Maybe, if I knew, I never would have left. It is kind of painful to be away from everything that you've ever known. Nobody will know the pain of exile until you are in exile. No matter where you go, there are times when people show you kindness and love, and there are times when they make you know that you are with them but not of them. That's when it hurts.

— Miriam Makeba

Soon after the Sharpeville massacre in 1960, Makeba learned that her mother had died. When she tried to return home for the funeral, she found that her South African passport had been cancelled. Makeba would remain in exile until 1990. Two of Makeba's uncles were killed in the massacre. The incident left her concerned about her family, many of whom were still in South Africa, including her daughter: the nine-year-old Bongi joined her mother in the US in August 1960. During her first few years in the US, Makeba had rarely sung explicitly political music, but her popularity had led to an increase in awareness of apartheid and the anti-apartheid movement. Following the Sharpeville killings, Makeba felt a responsibility to help, as she had been able to leave the country while others had not. From this point, she became an increasingly outspoken critic of apartheid and the white-minority government; before the massacre, she had taken care to avoid overtly political statements in South Africa.

Her musical career in the US continued to flourish. She signed a recording contract with RCA Victor, and released Miriam Makeba, her first studio album, in 1960, backed by Belafonte's band. RCA Victor chose to buy out Makeba's contract with Gallotone Records, and despite Makeba's inability to perform in South Africa, Gallotone received US$45,000 in the deal, which meant that Makeba received no royalties for her debut album. The album included one of her most famous hits in the US, "Qongqothwane", which was known in English as "The Click Song" because Makeba's audiences could not pronounce the Xhosa name. Time magazine called her the "most exciting new singing talent to appear in many years", and Newsweek compared her voice to "the smoky tones and delicate phrasing" of Ella Fitzgerald and the "intimate warmth" of Frank Sinatra. The album was not commercially successful, and Makeba was briefly dropped from RCA Victor: she was re-signed soon after as the label recognised the commercial possibilities of the growing interest in African culture. Her South African identity had been downplayed during her first signing, but it was strongly emphasised the second time to take advantage of this interest. Makeba made several appearances on television, often in the company of Belafonte. In 1962, Makeba and Belafonte sang at the birthday party for US President John F. Kennedy at Madison Square Garden, but Makeba did not go to the party afterwards because she was ill. Kennedy nevertheless insisted on meeting her, so Belafonte sent a car to pick her up. (Note: This was the same party at which Marilyn Monroe sang "Happy Birthday, Mr. President" to Kennedy.)

In 1964, Makeba released her second studio album for RCA Victor, The World of Miriam Makeba. An early example of world music, the album peaked at number eighty-six on the Billboard 200. Makeba's music had a cross-racial appeal in the US; white Americans were attracted to her image as an "exotic" African performer, and black Americans related their own experiences of racial segregation to Makeba's struggle against apartheid. Makeba found company among other African exiles and émigrés in New York, including Hugh Masekela, to whom she was married from 1964 to 1966. During their marriage, Makeba and Masekela were neighbours of the jazz musician Dizzy Gillespie in Englewood, New Jersey; they spent much of their time in Harlem. She also came to know actors Marlon Brando and Lauren Bacall, and musicians Louis Armstrong and Ray Charles. Fellow singer-activist Nina Simone became friendly with Makeba, as did actor Cicely Tyson; Makeba and Simone performed together at Carnegie Hall. Makeba was among black entertainers, activists, and intellectuals in New York at the time who believed that the civil rights movement and popular culture could reinforce each other, creating "a sense of intertwined political and cultural vibrancy"; other examples included Maya Angelou and Sidney Poitier. She later described her difficulty living with racial segregation, saying "There wasn't much difference in America; it was a country that had abolished slavery but there was apartheid in its own way."

==== Travel and activism ====
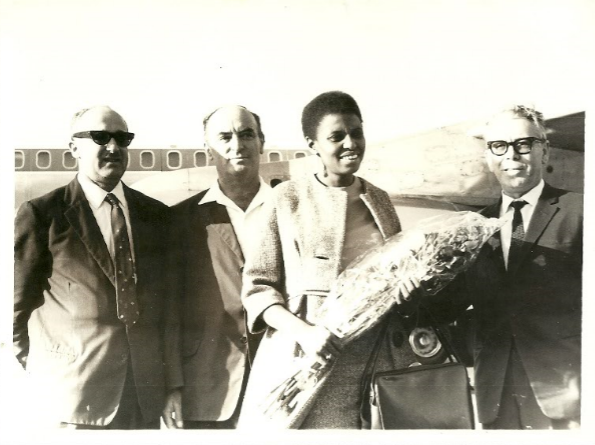
Makeba being welcomed during a visit to Israel in 1963

Makeba's music was also popular in Europe, and she travelled and performed there frequently. Acting on the advice of Belafonte, she added songs from Latin America, Europe, Israel, and elsewhere in Africa to her repertoire. She visited Kenya in 1962 in support of the country's independence from British colonial rule, and raised funds for its independence leader Jomo Kenyatta. Later that year she testified before the United Nations Special Committee against Apartheid about the effects of the system, asking for economic sanctions against South Africa's National Party government. She requested an arms embargo against South Africa, on the basis that weapons sold to the government would likely be used against black women and children. As a result, her music was banned in South Africa, and her South African citizenship and right to return were revoked. Makeba thus became stateless, but she was soon issued passports by Algeria, Guinea, Belgium and Ghana. Throughout her lifetime she held nine passports and was granted honorary citizenship in ten countries.

Soon after her testimony, Haile Selassie, the emperor of Ethiopia, invited her to sing at the inauguration of the Organisation of African Unity; she was the only performer asked to participate. As word spread about her ban from South Africa, she became a cause célèbre for Western liberals, and her presence in the civil rights movement linked it with the anti-apartheid struggle. In 1964 she was taught the song "Malaika" by a Kenyan student while backstage at a performance in San Francisco; the song later became a staple of her performances.

Would you not resist if you were allowed no rights in your own country because the color of your skin is different to that of the rulers and if you were punished for even asking for equality?

— Miriam Makeba

Throughout the 1960s, Makeba strengthened her involvement with a range of black-centred political movements, including the civil rights, anti-apartheid, Black Consciousness, and Black Power movements. She briefly met the Trinidadian-American activist Stokely Carmichael—the leader of the Student Nonviolent Coordinating Committee and a prominent figure in the Black Panther Party—after Belafonte invited him to one of Makeba's concerts; they met again in Conakry six years later. They entered a relationship, initially kept secret from all but their closest friends and family. Makeba participated in fundraising activities for various civil rights groups, including a benefit concert for the 1962 Southern Christian Leadership Conference that civil rights activist Martin Luther King Jr. referred to as the "event of the year". Following a concert and rally in Atlanta in support of King, Makeba and others were denied entrance to a restaurant as a result of Jim Crow laws, leading to a televised protest in front of the establishment. She also criticised King's Southern Christian Leadership Conference for its investment in South African companies, informing press that "Now my friend of long standing supports the country's persecution of my people and I must find a new idol". Her identity as an African woman in the civil rights movement helped create "an emerging liberal consensus" that extreme racial discrimination, whether domestically or internationally, was harmful. In 1964 she testified at the UN for a second time, quoting a song by Vanessa Redgrave in calling for quick action against the South African government.

Makeba and Belafonte received the Grammy Award for Best Folk Recording for An Evening with Belafonte/Makeba on 15 March 1966. The album dealt with the political plight of black South Africans under apartheid, including several songs critical of the South African government, such as "Ndodemnyama we Verwoerd" ("Watch out Verwoerd", a reference to Hendrik Verwoerd, one of the architects of apartheid), along with Makeba's composition "Nongqongqo" about political prisoners, which explicitly mentioned activists such as Nelson Mandela and Robert Sobukwe. It sold widely and raised Makeba's profile in the US; Belafonte and Makeba's concert tour following its release was often sold out, and the album has been described as the best they made together. Makeba's use of lyrics in Swahili, Xhosa, and Sotho led to her being seen as a representation of an "authentic" Africa by American audiences. In 1967, more than ten years after she first recorded the song, the single "Pata Pata" was released in the US on an album of the same title, and became a worldwide hit. During its recording, she and Belafonte had a disagreement, after which they stopped recording together.

=== Guinea ===
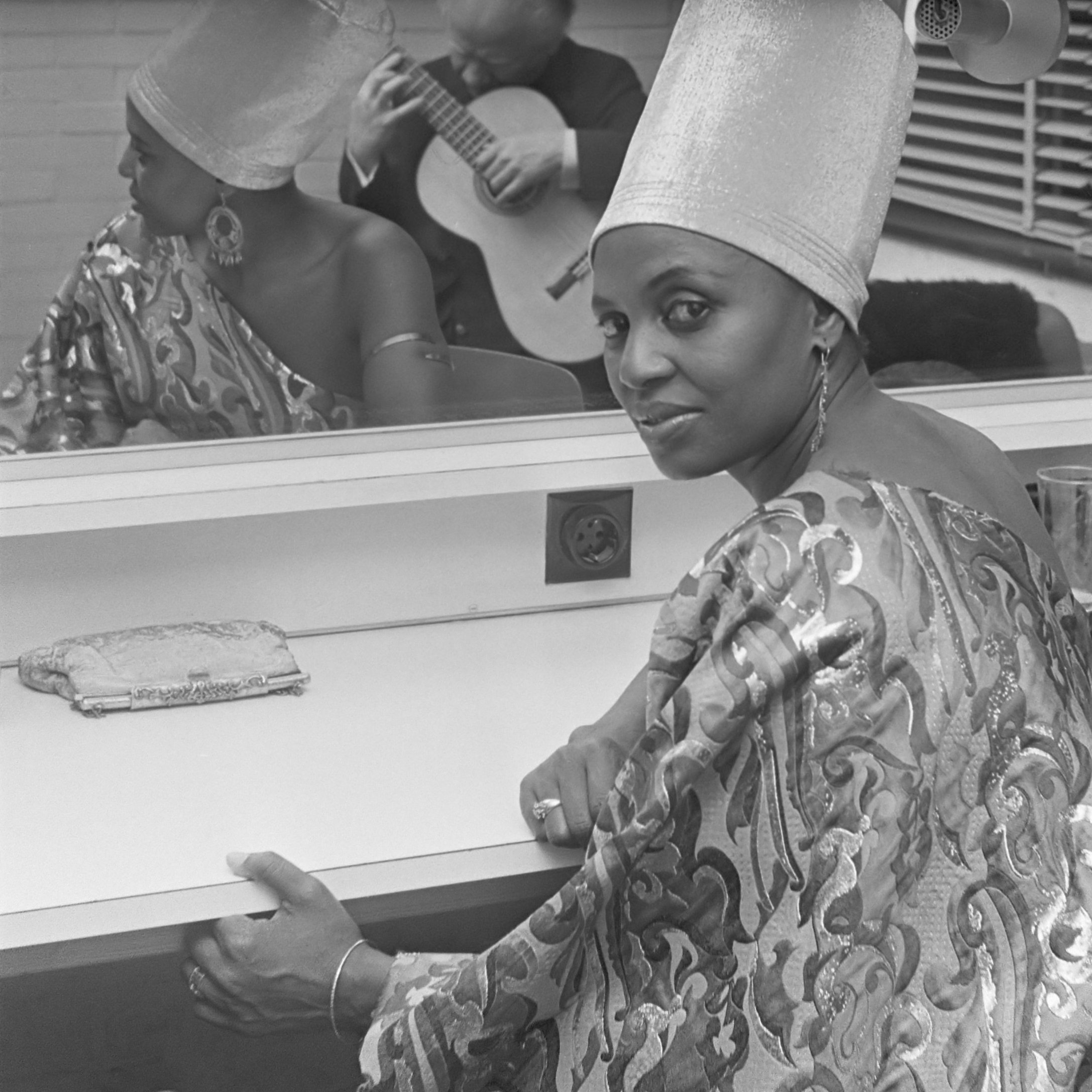
Makeba in 1969

Makeba married Carmichael in March 1968; this caused her popularity in the US to decline markedly. Conservatives came to regard her as a militant and an extremist, an image that alienated much of her fanbase. Her performances were cancelled and her coverage in the press declined despite her efforts to portray her marriage as apolitical. White American audiences stopped supporting her, and the US government took an interest in her activities. The Central Intelligence Agency began following her, and placed hidden microphones in her apartment; the Federal Bureau of Investigation also placed her under surveillance. While she and her husband were travelling in the Bahamas, she was banned from returning to the US, and was refused a visa. As a result, the couple moved to Guinea, where Carmichael changed his name to Kwame Touré. Makeba did not return to the US until 1987.

Guinea remained Makeba's home for the next 15 years. She and her husband became close to President Ahmed Sékou Touré and his wife, Andrée, as well as with Kwame Nkrumah, the deposed president of Ghana. Touré wanted to create a new style of African music, creating his own record label Syliphone for this purpose, and all musicians received a minimum wage if they practised for several hours every day. Makeba recorded for this label, and later stated that "I've never seen a country that did what Sékou Touré did for artists." After her rejection from the US she began to write music more directly critical of the US government's racial policies, recording and singing songs such as "Lumumba" in 1970 (referring to Patrice Lumumba, the assassinated Prime Minister of the Congo), and "Malcolm X" in 1974.

I'd already lived in exile for 10 years, and the world is free, even if some of the countries in it aren't, so I packed my bags and left.

— Miriam Makeba

Makeba performed more frequently in African countries, and in September 1974 she performed alongside a multitude of well-known African and American musicians at the Zaire 74 festival in Kinshasa, Zaire (formerly the Congo). She also became a diplomat for Ghana, and was appointed Guinea's official delegate to the UN in 1975; that year, she addressed the United Nations General Assembly, where she advocated for South Africa's liberation from apartheid. Also in 1975, she visited Mozambique as part of a Guinean delegation to mark Mozambique's independence from Portugal. To celebrate the moment, Makeba commissioned the song "Aluta Continua" (The Struggle Continues) from her daughter Bongi and Bill Salter.

She continued to perform in Europe and Asia, along with her African concerts, but not in the US, where a de facto boycott was in effect. Her performances in Africa were immensely popular: she was described as the highlight of FESTAC 77, a Pan-African arts festival in Nigeria in 1977, and during a Liberian performance of "Pata Pata", the stadium proved so loud that she was unable to complete the song. "Pata Pata", like her other songs, had been banned in South Africa. Another song she sang frequently in this period was "Nkosi Sikelel' iAfrika", though she never recorded it. Makeba later stated that it was during this period that she accepted the label "Mama Africa": scholar Omotayo Jolaosho writes that the epithet, by which she came to be widely known, was first given her by her daughter Bongi in an interview.

In 1976, the South African government replaced English and native South African languages with Afrikaans as the medium of instruction for many subjects in black schools, setting off the Soweto uprising. Between 15,000 and 20,000 students took part; caught unprepared, the police opened fire on the protesting children, killing hundreds and injuring more than a thousand. Hugh Masekela wrote "Soweto Blues" in response to the massacre, and the song was performed by Makeba, becoming a staple of her live performances for many years. A review in the magazine Musician said that the song had "searingly righteous lyrics" about the uprising that "cut to the bone". She had separated from Carmichael in 1973; in 1978 they divorced and in 1981 she married Bageot Bah, an airline executive. Makeba's daughter Bongi, and her three children, lived with Makeba for a period. Bongi, who was a singer in her own right, often accompanied her mother on stage, and contributed to her reputation. However, the relationship between the two grew strained after the death of Bongi's youngest child.

=== Belgium ===
I look at an ant and see myself: a native South African, endowed by nature with a strength much greater than my size so I might cope with the weight of a racism that crushes my spirit. I look at a bird and I see myself: a native South African, soaring above the injustices of apartheid on wings of pride, the pride of a beautiful people.

— Miriam Makeba

Makeba's daughter Bongi died in childbirth in 1985. Makeba was left responsible for her two surviving grandchildren, and decided to move out of Guinea, which had become less hospitable to her after Touré's death the previous year and the military coup that followed. She settled in the Woluwe-Saint-Lambert district of the Belgian capital Brussels. In the following year, Masekela introduced Makeba to Paul Simon, and a few months later she embarked on Simon's very successful Graceland Tour. The tour concluded with two concerts held in Harare, Zimbabwe, which were filmed in 1987 for release as Graceland: The African Concert. Makeba fractured her leg while on tour, but continued to perform from a wheelchair. Her involvement with Simon caused controversy: Graceland had been recorded in South Africa, breaking the cultural boycott of the country, and thus Makeba's participation in the tour was regarded as contravening the boycott (which Makeba herself endorsed). After touring the world with Simon, Warner Bros. Records signed Makeba and she released Sangoma ("Healer"), an album of healing chants named in honour of her sangoma mother.

In preparation for the Graceland tour, she worked with journalist James Hall to write an autobiography titled Makeba: My Story. The book contained descriptions of her experience with apartheid, and was also critical of the commodification and consumerism she experienced in the US. The book was translated into five languages. She took part in the Nelson Mandela 70th Birthday Tribute, a popular-music concert staged on 11 June 1988 at London's Wembley Stadium, and broadcast to an audience of 600 million across 67 countries. Political aspects of the concert were heavily censored in the US by the Fox television network. The use of music to raise awareness of apartheid paid off: a survey after the concert found that among people aged between 16 and 24, three-quarters knew of Mandela, and supported his release from prison.

== Return to South Africa, final years and death ==
Following growing pressure from the anti-apartheid movement both domestically and internationally, in 1990 State President Frederik Willem de Klerk reversed the ban on the African National Congress and other anti-apartheid organisations, and announced that Mandela would shortly be released from prison. Mandela was released in February 1990. He persuaded Makeba to try to return to South Africa; she obtained a six-day visa after months of effort, and entered South Africa using her French passport on 10 June 1990. Her arrival was a considerable event, featuring meetings, interviews, and singing by Brenda Fassie.

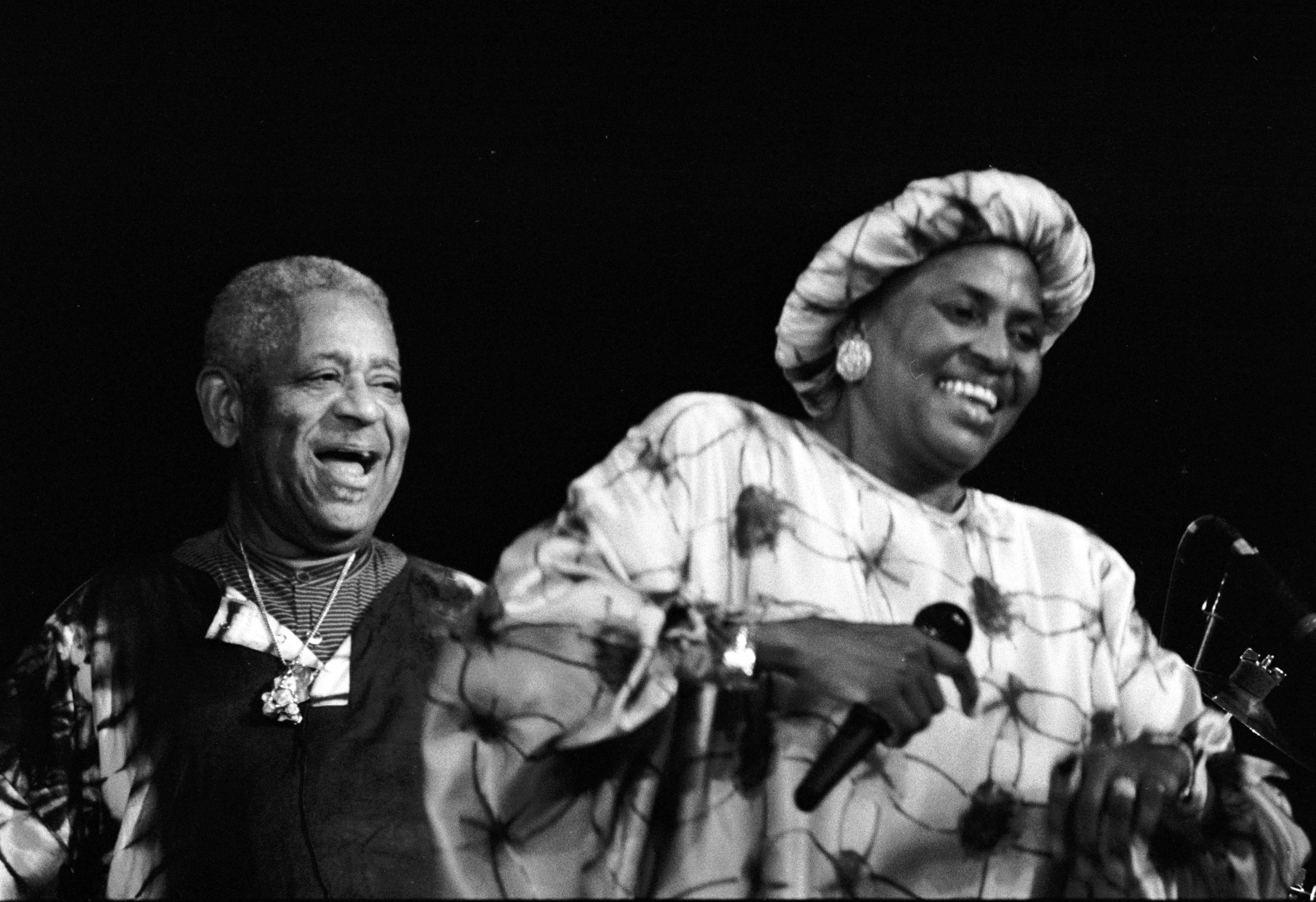
Makeba and Dizzy Gillespie in Calvados, France, 1991

Makeba, Gillespie, Simone, and Masekela recorded and released her studio album, Eyes on Tomorrow, in 1991. It combined jazz, R&B, pop, and traditional African music, and was a hit across Africa. Makeba and Gillespie then toured the world together to promote it. In November she made a guest appearance on a US sitcom, The Cosby Show. In April 1992, she performed two concerts in Johannesburg, her first in South Africa since her exile in 1960. In the same year she starred in the film Sarafina! which centred on students involved in the 1976 Soweto uprising. Makeba portrayed the title character's mother, Angelina, a role which The New York Times described as having been performed with "immense dignity".

On 16 October 1999, Makeba was named a Goodwill Ambassador of the Food and Agriculture Organization of the United Nations. In January 2000, her album, Homeland, produced by the New York City based record label Putumayo World Music, was nominated for a Grammy Award in the Best World Music Album category. She worked closely with Graça Machel-Mandela, the South African first lady, advocating for children suffering from HIV/AIDS, child soldiers, and the physically handicapped. She established the Makeba Centre for Girls, a home for orphans, described in an obituary as her most personal project. She also took part in the 2002 documentary Amandla!: A Revolution in Four-Part Harmony, which examined the struggles of black South Africans against apartheid through the music of the period. Makeba's second autobiography, Makeba: The Miriam Makeba Story, was published in 2004. In 2005 she announced that she would retire and began a farewell tour, but despite having osteoarthritis, continued to perform until her death. During this period, her grandchildren Nelson Lumumba Lee and Zenzi Lee, and her great-grandchild Lindelani, occasionally joined her performances.

On 9 November 2008, Makeba fell ill during a concert in Castel Volturno, Caserta, Italy. The concert had been organised to support the writer Roberto Saviano in his stand against the Camorra, a criminal organisation active in the region. She suffered a heart attack after singing her hit song "Pata Pata", and was taken to the Pineta Grande clinic, where doctors were unable to revive her. (Note: Francesco Longanella, medical director of the Pineta Grande Clinic, told Reuters that "[Miriam Makeba] arrived [at the Pineta Grande Clinic] at 11:15 pm [of 9 November 2008], [but that she was] already dead [...] [we] tried to revive her for three quarters of an hour." (Translated from Italian))

== Music and image ==
=== Musical style ===
The groups with which Makeba began her career performed mbube, a style of vocal harmony which drew on American jazz, ragtime, and Anglican church hymns, as well as indigenous styles of music. Johannesburg musician Dolly Rathebe was an early influence on Makeba's music, as were female jazz singers from the US. Historian David Coplan writes that the "African jazz" made popular by Makeba and others was "inherently hybridized" rather than derivative of any particular genre, blending as it did marabi and jazz, and was "Americanized African music, not Africanized American music". The music that she performed was described by British writer Robin Denselow as a "unique blend of rousing township styles and jazz-influenced balladry".

Makeba released more than 30 albums during her career. The dominant styles of these shifted over time, moving from African jazz to recordings influenced by Belafonte's "crooning" to music drawing from traditional South African musical forms. She has been associated with the genres of world music and Afropop. She also incorporated Latin American musical styles into her performances. Historian Ruth Feldstein described her music as "[crossing] the borders between what many people associated with avant-garde and 'quality' culture and the commercial mainstream"; the latter aspect often drew criticism. She was able to appeal to audiences from many political, racial, and national backgrounds.

She was known for having a dynamic vocal range, and was described as having an emotional awareness during her performances. She occasionally danced during her shows, and was described as having a sensuous presence on stage. She was able to vary her voice considerably: an obituary remarked that she "could soar like an opera singer, but she could also whisper, roar, hiss, growl and shout. She could sing while making the epiglottal clicks of the Xhosa language." She sang in English and several African languages, but never in Afrikaans, the language of the apartheid government in South Africa. She once stated "When Afrikaaners sing in my language, then I will sing theirs." English was seen as the language of political resistance by black South Africans due to the educational barriers they faced under apartheid; the Manhattan Brothers, with whom Makeba had sung in Sophiatown, had been prohibited from recording in English. Her songs in African languages have been described as reaffirming black pride.

=== Politics and perception ===
Makeba said that she did not perform political music, but music about her personal life in South Africa, which included describing the pain she felt living under apartheid. She once stated "people say I sing politics, but what I sing is not politics, it is the truth", an example of the mixing of personal and political issues for musicians living during apartheid. When she first entered the US, she avoided discussing apartheid explicitly, partly out of concern for her family still in South Africa. Nonetheless, she is known for using her voice to convey the political message of opposition to apartheid, performing widely and frequently for civil rights and anti-apartheid organisations. Even songs that did not carry an explicitly political message were seen as subversive, due to their being banned in South Africa. Makeba saw her music as a tool of activism, saying "In our struggle, songs are not simply entertainment for us. They are the way we communicate." As African countries became independent of European colonial powers, she was invited to sing at independence ceremonies, including in Kenya, Angola, Zambia, Tanganyika (now part of Tanzania), and Mozambique. She expressed her political views, and criticism of apartheid in particular, more frequently in later years; her exile, and the death of her daughter, have both been identified as making her more vocal.

Makeba's use of the clicks common in languages such as Xhosa and Zulu (as in "Qongqothwane", "The Click Song") was frequently remarked upon by Western audiences. It contributed to her popularity and her exotic image, which scholars have described as a kind of othering, exacerbated by the fact that Western audiences often could not understand her lyrics. Critics in the US described her as the "African tribeswoman" and as an "import from South Africa", often depicting her in condescending terms as a product of a more primitive society. In seeing her as an embodiment of Africa, Western audiences tended to ignore her cosmopolitan background. Conversely, she is also described as shaping Pan-African identity during the decline of colonialism. Commentators also frequently described her in terms of the prominent men she was associated with, despite her own prominence. During her early career in South Africa she had been seen as a sex symbol, an image that received considerably less attention in the US.

Makeba was described as a style icon, both in her home country and the US. She wore no makeup and refused to straighten her hair for shows, thus helping establish a style that came to be known internationally as the "Afro look". According to fashion scholar Tanisha C. Ford, her hairstyle represented a "liberated African beauty aesthetic". She was seen as a beauty icon by South African schoolgirls, who were compelled to shorten their hair by the apartheid government. Makeba stuck to wearing African jewellery; she disapproved of the skin-lighteners commonly used by South African women at the time, and refused to appear in advertisements for them. Her self-presentation has been characterised by scholars as a rejection of the predominantly white standards of beauty that women in the US were held to, which allowed Makeba to partially escape the sexualisation directed at women performers during this period. Nonetheless, the terms used to describe her in the US media have been identified by scholars as frequently used to "sexualize, infantalize, and animalize" people of African heritage.

== Legacy ==
=== Musical influence ===
Makeba has been credited with popularising world music, along with artists such as Youssou N'Dour, Salif Keita, Angélique Kidjo, Ali Farka Touré, and Baaba Maal (pictured clockwise from top left).

Makeba was among the most visible Africans in the US; as a result, she was often emblematic of the continent of Africa for Americans. Her music earned her the moniker "Mama Africa", and she was variously described as the "Empress of African Song", the "Queen of South African music", and Africa's "first superstar". Music scholar J. U. Jacobs said that Makeba's music had "both been shaped by and given shape to black South African and American music". The jazz musician Abbey Lincoln is among those identified as being influenced by Makeba. Makeba and Simone were among a group of artists who helped shape soul music. Longtime collaborator Belafonte called her "the most revolutionary new talent to appear in any medium in the last decade". Speaking after her death, Mandela called her "South Africa's first lady of song", and said that "her music inspired a powerful sense of hope in all of us."

Outside her home country Makeba was credited with bringing African music to a Western audience. She is credited, along with artists such as Youssou N'Dour, Salif Keita, Ali Farka Touré, Baaba Maal and Angélique Kidjo, with popularising the genre of world music. She disliked this label, however, believing it marginalized music from the "third world". Her work with Belafonte in the 1960s has been described as creating the genre of world music before the concept entered the popular imagination, and also as highlighting the diversity and cultural pluralism within African music. Within South Africa, Makeba has been described as influencing artists such as kwaito musician Thandiswa Mazwai and her band Bongo Maffin, whose track "De Makeba" was a modified version of Makeba's "Pata Pata", and one of several tribute recordings released after her return to South Africa. South African jazz musician Simphiwe Dana has been described as "the new Miriam Makeba". South African singer Lira has frequently been compared with Makeba, particularly for her performance of "Pata Pata" during the opening ceremony of the 2010 Football World Cup. A year later, Kidjo dedicated her concert in New York to Makeba, as a musician who had "paved the way for her success". In an obituary, scholar Lara Allen referred to Makeba as "arguably South Africa's most famous musical export".

=== Activism ===
Makeba was among the most visible people campaigning against the apartheid system in South Africa, and was responsible for popularising several anti-apartheid songs, including "Meadowlands" by Strike Vilakezi and "Ndodemnyama we Verwoerd" (Watch out, Verwoerd) by Vuyisile Mini. Due to her high profile, she became a spokesperson of sorts for Africans living under oppressive governments, and in particular for black South Africans living under apartheid. When the South African government prevented her from entering her home country, she became a symbol of "apartheid's cruelty", and she used her position as a celebrity by testifying against apartheid before the UN in 1962 and 1964. Many of her songs were banned within South Africa, leading to Makeba's records being distributed underground, and even her apolitical songs being seen as subversive. She thus became a symbol of resistance to the white-minority government both within and outside South Africa. In an interview in 2000, Masekela said that "there [was] nobody in Africa who made the world more aware of what was happening in South Africa than Miriam Makeba."

Makeba has also been associated with the movement against colonialism, with the civil rights and black power movements in the US, and with the Pan-African movement. She called for unity between black people of African descent across the world: "Africans who live everywhere should fight everywhere. The struggle is no different in South Africa, the streets of Chicago, Trinidad or Canada. The Black people are the victims of capitalism, racism and oppression, period". After marrying Carmichael she often appeared with him during his speeches; Carmichael later described her presence at these events as an asset, and Feldstein wrote that Makeba enhanced Carmichael's message that "black is beautiful". Along with performers such as Simone, Lena Horne, and Abbey Lincoln, she used her position as a prominent musician to advocate for civil rights. Their activism has been described as simultaneously calling attention to racial and gender disparities, and highlighting "that the liberation they desired could not separate race from sex". Makeba's critique of second-wave feminism as being the product of luxury led to observers being unwilling to call her a feminist. Scholar Ruth Feldstein stated that Makeba and others influenced both black feminism and second-wave feminism through their advocacy, and the historian Jacqueline Castledine referred to her as one of the "most steadfast voices for social justice".

=== Awards and recognition ===
Makeba's 1965 collaboration with Harry Belafonte won a Grammy Award, making her the first African recording artist to win this award. She was named the Best Female Artist of Africa and honoured with a lifetime achievement award at the 1996 Kora Awards. At the South African Music Awards (SAMAs), she received five awards: Best Female Artist and Best Adult Contemporary African Album for her 2000 album Homeland at the eighth ceremony in 2001, along with awards for Best Adult Contemporary Album and Best Jazz Vocal Album for her 2003 album Reflections, as well as Best DVD for her live album Live at Bern's Salonger, Stockholm, Sweden, 1966, at the tenth ceremony in 2004. Makeba shared the 2001 Polar Music Prize with Sofia Gubaidulina. They received their prize from Carl XVI Gustaf, the King of Sweden, during a nationally televised ceremony at Berwaldhallen, Stockholm, on 27 May 2002. Rolling Stone placed her 53rd in its list of "The 200 Greatest Singers of All Time" in 2023.

Makeba won the Dag Hammarskjöld Peace Prize in 1986, and in 2001 was awarded the Otto Hahn Peace Medal in Gold by the United Nations Association of Germany (DGVN) in Berlin, "for outstanding services to peace and international understanding". She also received several honorary doctorates. In 2003, she was awarded South Africa's Order for Meritorious Service, and in the next year, she was voted 38th in a poll ranking 100 Great South Africans.

The University of Fort Hare's Miriam Makeba Centre of Performing Arts, which was established around 2003, was named in her honour. From 25 to 27 September 2009, a tribute television show to Makeba, entitled Hommage à Miriam Makeba and curated by Beninoise singer-songwriter and activist Angélique Kidjo, was held at the Cirque d'hiver in Paris. The show was presented as Mama Africa: Celebrating Miriam Makeba at the Barbican in London on 21 November 2009. A documentary film titled Mama Africa, about Makeba's life, co-written and directed by Finnish director Mika Kaurismäki, was released in 2011. On 4 March 2013, and again on International Women's Day in 2017, Google honoured her with a Google Doodle on their homepage. In 2014 she was honoured (along with Nelson Mandela, Albertina Sisulu and Steve Biko) in the Belgian city of Ghent, which named a square after her, the "Miriam Makebaplein". Makeba was named 1967's "woman of the year" by Time magazine in 2020, as one of a list of 100 "women of the year" for the years 1920–2019.

In 2015 the French singer Jain released "Makeba", a tribute. Mama Africa, a musical about Makeba, was produced in South Africa by Niyi Coker. Originally titled Zenzi!, the musical premiered to a sold-out crowd in Cape Town on 26 May 2016. It was performed in the US in St. Louis, Missouri and at the Skirball Center for the Performing Arts in New York City between October and December 2016. The musical returned to South Africa in February 2017 for what would have been Makeba's 85th birthday. American-born African jazz singer Somi wrote a play about Makeba, Dreaming Zenzile, which premiered in 2021, and released a tribute album dedicated to her, Zenzile: The Reimagination of Miriam Makeba (2022). In June 2023, "Makeba" received a resurgence in popularity due to the virality it achieved on TikTok.

== Notable songs and albums ==
This is a list of albums and songs, including covers, by Miriam Makeba that have received significant mention in commentary about her or about the musical and political movements she participated in.

Albums

- Miriam Makeba (1960)
- The Many Voices of Miriam Makeba (1962)
- An Evening with Belafonte/Makeba (1965)
- Comme une symphonie d'amour (1979)
- The Queen of African Music (1987)
- Sangoma (1988)
- Welela (1989)
- Eyes on Tomorrow (1991)
- Homeland (2000)

Songs

- "Lakutshn, Ilanga/Lovely Lies" (1956)
- "Sophiatown is Gone"
- "The Click Song" / "Mbube" (1963)
- "Pata Pata" (1967)
- "Lumumba" (1970)
- "Malcolm X" (1974)
- "Soweto Blues" (1977)
- "Thula Sizwe/I Shall Be Released" (1991)
- "Malaika"

== See also ==
- Culture of South Africa
- List of South African Grammy Award winners and nominees

== Notes and references ==
=== Bibliography ===
- Mojapelo, Max (2008). Beyond Memory: Recording the History, Moments and Memories of South African Music. African Minds. ISBN 978-1-920299-28-6.
- Allen, Lara (2008). "Remembering Miriam Makeba". Journal of the Musical Arts in Africa. 5 (1): 89–90. doi:10.2989/JMAA.2008.5.1.6.789.
- Allen, Lara (2011). "Makeba, Miriam Zenzi". In Akyeampong, Emmanuel K.; Gates, Henry Louis Jr. (eds.). Dictionary of African Biography. Oxford University Press. ISBN 978-0-19-985725-8.
- Blocker, Jack S.; Fahey, David M.; Tyrrell, Ian R. (2003). Alcohol and Temperance in Modern History: An International Encyclopedia. ABC-CLIO. ISBN 978-1-57607-833-4.
- Bordowitz, Hank (2006). "Miriam Makeba". In Kaufman, Alan (ed.). The Outlaw Bible of American Essays. Thunder's Mouth. pp. 313–316, 333–334. ISBN 1-56025-935-3. OCLC 74175340.
- Carmichael, Stokely; Thelwell, Michael (2003). Ready for Revolution: The Life and Struggles of Stokely Carmichael (Kwame Ture). Simon & Schuster. ISBN 978-0-684-85003-0.
- Castledine, Jacqueline (2011). "Gender, Jazz, and Justice in Cold War Freedom Movements". In McGuire, Danielle L.; Dittmer, John (eds.). Freedom Rights. The University Press of Kentucky. pp. 223–244. ISBN 9780813134499 – via Project Muse.
- Coplan, David (July 2005). "God Rock Africa: Thoughts on Politics in Popular Black Performance in South Africa". African Studies. 64 (1): 9–27. doi:10.1080/00020180500139015. S2CID 145099483.
- Eze, Michael Onyebuchi (2010). Intellectual History in Contemporary South Africa. Palgrave Macmillan. ISBN 978-0-230-10969-8.
- Feldstein, Ruth (2013). How It Feels to Be Free: Black Women Entertainers and the Civil Rights Movement. Oxford University Press. ISBN 978-0-19-531403-8.
- Fleming, Tyler (2016). "A Marriage of Inconvenience: Miriam Makeba's Relationship with Stokely Carmichael and her Music Career in the United States". Safundi: The Journal of South African and American Studies. 17 (3): 312–338. doi:10.1080/17533171.2016.1176720. S2CID 147829245.
- Ford, Tanisha (2015). Liberated Threads: Black Women, Style, and the Global Politics of Soul. University of North Carolina Press. ISBN 978-1-4696-2515-7 – via Project Muse.
- Jacobs, J. U. (1989). "The Blues: An Afro-American Matrix for Black South African Writing". English in Africa. 16 (2): 3–17. JSTOR 40238786.
- Jolaosho, Omotayo (29 October 2021). "Miriam Makeba". In Spear, Thomas T. (ed.). Oxford Research Encyclopedia of African History. Oxford University Press. doi:10.1093/acrefore/9780190277734.013.774. ISBN 978-0-19-027773-4.
- Khan, Katy (2008). "South-South Cultural Cooperation: Transnational Identities in the Music of Dorothy Masuka and Miriam Makeba". Muziki: Journal of Music Research in Africa. 5 (1): 145–151. doi:10.1080/18125980802633052. S2CID 142987814.
- Masemola, Kgomotso Michael (2011). "Between Tinseltown and Sophiatown: The Double Temporality of Popular Culture in the Autobiographical Cultural Memory of Bloke Modisane and Miriam Makeba". Journal of Literary Studies. 27 (1): 1–27. doi:10.1080/02564718.2011.557226. hdl:10500/18417. S2CID 144452759.
- Meredith, Martin (2010). Mandela: A Biography. PublicAffairs. ISBN 978-1-58648-832-1.
- Muller, Carol A. (2006). "The New African Diaspora, the Built Environment and the Past in Jazz". Ethnomusicology Forum. 15 (1): 63–86. doi:10.1080/17411910600634270. S2CID 194059852.
- Ohadike, Don C. (2007). Sacred Drums of Liberation: Religions and Music of Resistance in Africa and the Diaspora. Africa World Press. ISBN 978-1-59221-517-1.
- Poet, J. (11 February 2009). "Miriam Makeba: Mama Africa Goes Home". Crawdaddy!.
- Redmond, Shana L. (2013). Anthem: Social Movements and the Sound of Solidarity in the African Diaspora. New York University Press. ISBN 978-0-8147-8932-2 – via Project MUSE.
- Reed, Thomas Vernon (2005). The Art Of Protest: Culture And Activism From The Civil Rights Movement To The Streets Of Seattle. University of Minnesota Press. ISBN 978-0-8166-3770-6.
- Roux-Kemp, Andra la (2014). "Struggle Music: South African Politics in Song". Law and Humanities. 8 (2): 247–268. doi:10.5235/17521483.8.2.247. S2CID 59415090.
- Schumann, Anne (2008). "The Beat that Beat Apartheid: The Role of Music in the Resistance against Apartheid in South Africa" (PDF). Wiener Zeitschrift für kritische Afrikastudien. 14 (8).
- Schwarz-Bart, Simone; Schwarz-Bart, André; Réjous, Rose-Myriam (2003). Modern African Women. In Praise of Black Women: Volume 3. University of Wisconsin. ISBN 0-299-17270-8. OCLC 66731111.
- Sizemore-Barber, April (July–October 2012). "The Voice of (Which?) Africa: Miriam Makeba in America". Safundi: The Journal of South African and American Studies. 13 (3–4): 251–276. doi:10.1080/17533171.2012.715416. S2CID 144160855.
- Stanton, Andrea L.; Ramsamy, Edward; Seybolt, Peter J. (2012). Cultural Sociology of the Middle East, Asia, and Africa: An Encyclopedia. SAGE. ISBN 978-1-4129-8176-7.
- Stewart, Gary (2003). "What goes up...". Rumba on the River: A History of the Popular Music of the Two Congos (illustrated ed.). Verso. ISBN 978-1-85984-368-0.
- Tobler, John (1992). NME Rock 'N' Roll Years (1st ed.). Reed International Books. CN 5585.
