= John Denver discography =

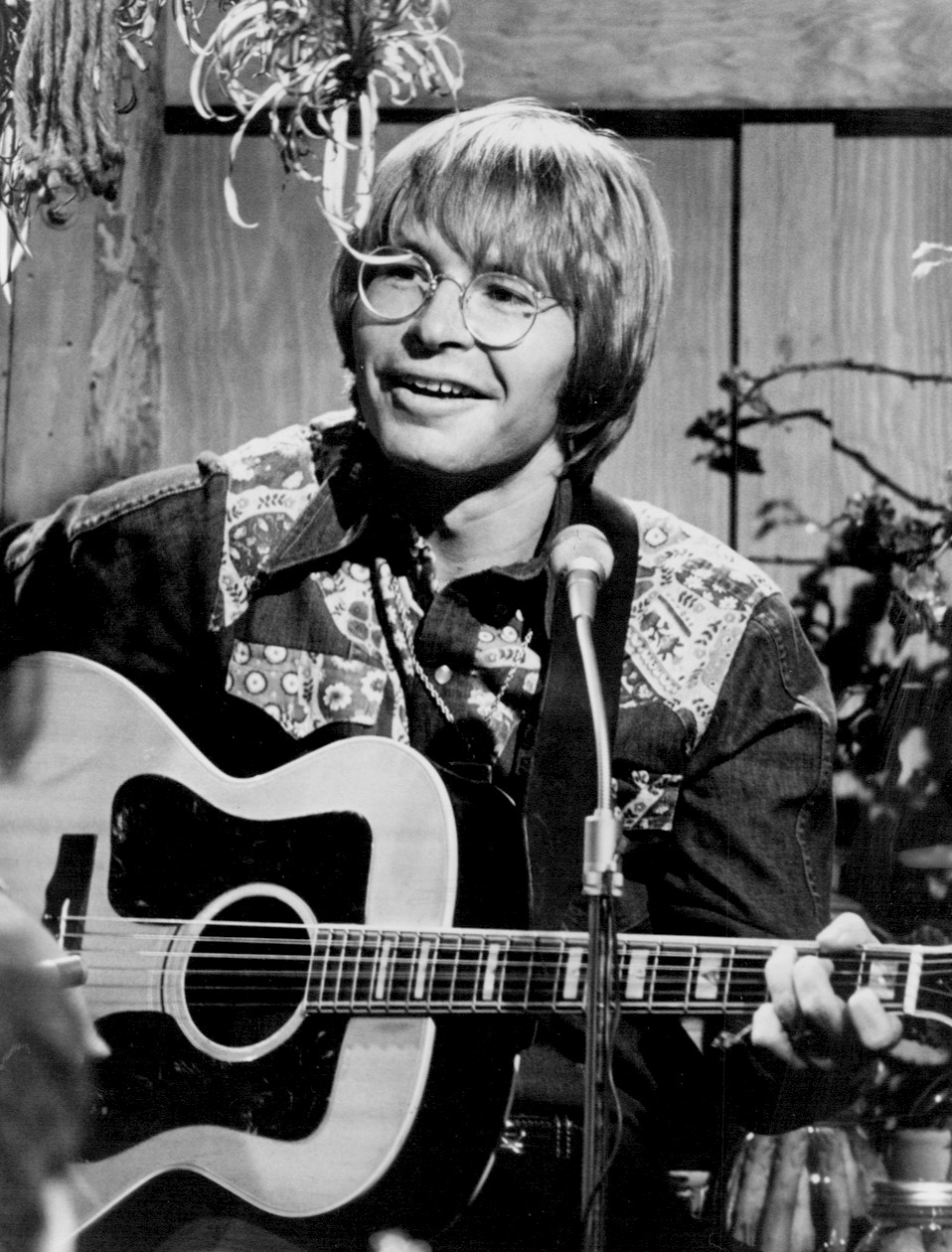
- Denver during the taping of his An Evening with John Denver television special in 1975
- Studio albums: 33
- Live albums: 10
- Compilation albums: 26
- Singles: 44
- Collaboration albums: 2
- Singles: 11

This page is a comprehensive discography of American folk musician John Denver. Denver had four number one hits on the U.S. Billboard Hot 100 singles chart, all achieved between 1973 and 1975: "Sunshine on My Shoulders", "Annie's Song", "Thank God I'm a Country Boy" and "I'm Sorry". Three of his albums were also number one sellers: Back Home Again, Windsong and John Denver's Greatest Hits, again all released between 1973 and 1975.

Denver's studio albums categories list separately his early albums with the Mitchell Trio, and then his own studio albums by decade, live albums, Christmas albums, and compilation albums. These charts also include their certifications for sales data. His singles are arranged by decade and include several specialty categories—among them his Christmas singles, his single from his collaboration album with Plácido Domingo, and his single from his collaboration as a guest performer with the Nitty Gritty Dirt Band. The charts are inclusive of their peak positions by country of sale.

== Studio albums ==
=== With the Mitchell Trio ===
Title	Album details
That's the Way It's Gonna Be (John Denver, Mike Kobluk, Joe Frazier)	Release date: August 1965; Label: Mercury Records
Violets of Dawn (John Denver, Mike Kobluk, Joe Frazier)	Release date: December 1965; Label: Mercury Records
Alive (John Denver, Mike Kobluk, David Boise)	Release date: 1967; Label: Reprise Records
Beginnings: John Denver with the Mitchell Trio (John Denver, Mike Kobluk, Joe Frazier)	Release date: 1974; Label: Mercury Records

=== 1960s albums ===
Title	Album details	Peak chart positions		Certifications (sales threshold)
Title	Album details	US	UK	Certifications (sales threshold)
John Denver Sings	Release date: 1966; Label: self-released	—	—	
Rhymes & Reasons	Release date: October 1969; Label: RCA Records	148	21	UK: Silver
"—" denotes releases that did not chart

=== 1970s albums ===
Title	Album details	Peak chart positions						Certifications (sales threshold)
Title	Album details	US Country	US	AUS	CAN	NZ	UK	Certifications (sales threshold)
Take Me to Tomorrow	Release date: May 1970; Label: RCA Records	—	197	—	—	—	—	
Whose Garden Was This	Release date: October 1970; Label: RCA Records	—	—	—	—	—	—	
Poems, Prayers & Promises	Release date: May 1971; Label: RCA Records	6	15	—	9	—	19	US: Platinum
Aerie	Release date: December 1971; Label: RCA Records	37	75	48	33	—	—	US: Gold
Rocky Mountain High	Release date: September 15, 1972; Label: RCA Records	40	4	—	1	—	11	US: 2× Platinum; UK: Gold
Farewell Andromeda	Release date: June 1973; Label: RCA Records	—	16	—	23	—	—	US: Gold
Back Home Again	Release date: June 1974; Label: RCA Records	1	1	2	1	14	3	US: 3× Platinum; UK: Silver; CAN: Gold
Windsong	Release date: September 1975; Label: RCA Records	1	1	1	1	5	14	US: 2× Platinum; AUS: Gold; CAN: Platinum
Spirit	Release date: August 1976; Label: RCA Records	3	7	13	22	7	9	US: Platinum
I Want to Live	Release date: November 1977; Label: RCA Records	10	45	16	38	—	25	US: Platinum
John Denver^{[A]}	Release date: January 1979; Label: RCA Records	10	25	94	25	—	68	US: Gold
"—" denotes releases that did not chart

=== 1980s albums ===
Title	Album details	Peak chart positions					Certifications (sales threshold)
Title	Album details	US Country	US	CAN	AUS	UK	Certifications (sales threshold)
Autograph	Release date: February 1980; Label: RCA Records	28	39	72	56	—	
Some Days Are Diamonds	Release date: June 1981; Label: RCA Records	7	32	—	20	—	US: Gold
Seasons of the Heart	Release date: May 4, 1982; Label: RCA Records	18	39	—	65	—	US: Gold
It's About Time	Release date: November 15, 1983; Label: RCA Records	55	61	92	19	90	
Dreamland Express	Release date: June 1985; Label: RCA Records	48	90	—	71	—	
One World	Release date: June 1986; Label: RCA Records	—	—	—	90	91	
Higher Ground	Release date: June 26, 1988; Label: Windstar Records	49	—	—	5	—	ARIA: Gold
"—" denotes releases that did not chart

=== 1990s albums ===
Title	Album details	Peak chart positions		
Title	Album details	US Country	US	AUS
Earth Songs	Release date: June 1990; Label: Windstar Records	—	—	62
Stonehaven Sunrise / The Flower That Shattered the Stone	Release date: September 1990; Label: Windstar Records	—	185	113
Different Directions	Release date: September 24, 1991; Label: Windstar Records	—	—	71
Love Again	Release date: 1996; Label: CMC Records	16	130	118
All Aboard!	Release date: August 26, 1997; Label: Sony Wonder	—	165	158
Forever, John	Release date: September 29, 1998; Label: RCA Records	—	—	—
"—" denotes releases that did not chart

== Live albums ==
Title	Album details	Peak chart positions						Certifications
Title	Album details	US Country	US	CAN	AUS	NZ	UK	Certifications
An Evening with John Denver	Release date: January 29, 1975; Label: RCA Records	1	2	1	4	1	31	US: 3× Platinum; CAN: Gold
Live in London	Release date: 1976; Label: RCA Records	—	—	—	—	—	2	
Live at the Sydney Opera House	Release date: 1978; Label: RCA Records	—	—	—	—	—	—	
The Wildlife Concert	Release date: 1995; Label: Legacy Recordings	—	104	—	45	—	—	US: Gold; AUS: 4× Platinum (video)
The Best of John Denver Live	Release date: 1997; Label: Legacy Recordings	8	52	—	—	—	—	US: Gold
Sing Australia	Release date: July 2001; Label: BMG Australia Limited	—	—	—	109	—	—	
Christmas in Concert	Release date: September 2001; Label: RCA Records	60	—	—	—	—	—	
The Harbor Lights Concert	Release date: April 2002; Label: RCA Records	—	—	—	—	—	—	
Live in the U.S.S.R.	Release date: 2007; Label: AAO Music	—	—	—	—	—	—	
Live at Cedar Rapids	Release date: 2010; Label: Collectors' Choice Music	—	—	—	—	—	—	
"—" denotes releases that did not chart

== Christmas albums ==
Title	Album details	Peak chart positions				Certifications (sales threshold)
Title	Album details	US Country	US	AUS	CAN	Certifications (sales threshold)
Rocky Mountain Christmas	Release date: 1975; Label: RCA Records	—	14	40	40	US: 2× Platinum; CAN: Gold
John Denver and the Muppets: A Christmas Together	Release date: October 1979; Label: RCA Records	13	26	—	45	US: Platinum; CAN: Gold
Christmas, Like a Lullaby	Release date: December 1990; Label: Windstar Records	—	—	59	—	
"—" denotes releases that did not chart

== Compilation albums ==
Title	Album details	Peak chart positions							Certifications (sales threshold)
Title	Album details	US Country	US	CAN Country	CAN	AUS	NZ	UK	Certifications (sales threshold)
John Denver's Greatest Hits	Release date: November 1973; Label: RCA Records	47	1	—	1	4	17	7	US: 9× Platinum; AUS: Platinum; CAN: 5× Platinum; UK: Silver
John Denver's Greatest Hits Volume 2	Release date: March 1977; Label: RCA Records	7	6	—	24	3	17	9	US: 2× Platinum; ARIA: 2× Platinum; CAN: Gold
John Denver's Greatest Hits Volume 3	Release date: November 1984; Label: RCA Records	—	203	—	—	—	—	—	US: Gold
Take Me Home, Country Roads and Other Hits	Release date: 1991; Label: BMG/RCA	—	—	40	—	—	—	—	
Favorites	Release date: August 1992; Label: RCA	—	—	—	—	35	—	—	ARIA: Gold
A Portrait	Release date: 1994; Label: BMG/RCA	—	—	—	—	38	—	—	US: Platinum; ARIA: Gold
The John Denver Collection	Release date: 1995; Label: Delta	—	—	—	—	—	—	—	
The Rocky Mountain Collection	Release date: 1996; Label: RCA Records	50	—	—	—	49	19	19	US: Platinum; UK: Gold
Reflections: Songs of Love & Life	Release date: 1996; Label: RCA Records	36	—	13	—	—	—	—	
Country Roads Collection	Release date: 1997; Label: RCA Records	33	—	—	—	148	—	—	
The Best of John Denver	Release date: 1998; Label: Madacy Records	38	—	—	—	—	10	—	US: Platinum; UK: Gold
Greatest Country Hits	Release date: 1998; Label: RCA Records	36	—	—	—	—	—	—	
Legendary John Denver	Release date: 1999; Label: BMG RCA	—	—	—	—	108	—	—	ARIA: 2× Platinum
John Denver Christmas	Release date: 1999; Label: LaserLight	53	—	—	—	—	—	—	
The Very Best of John Denver	Release date: June 2001; Label: BMG RCA	—	—	—	—	133	—	—	
Songs for America	Release date: September 2002; Label: Sony BMG	75	—	—	—	—	—	—	
The Essential John Denver	Release date: 2004; Label: Sony BMG	66	—	—	—	—	—	—	
Definitive All-Time Greatest Hits	Release date: 2004; Label: RCA Records	9	52	—	—	—	—	—	US: Gold
A Song's Best Friend: The Very Best of John Denver	Release date: 2004; Label: RCA Records	—	—	—	—	25	—	18	
16 Biggest Hits	Release date: 2006; Label: RCA Records	61	—	—	—	—	—	—	
The Essential John Denver	Release date: 2007; Label: RCA Records	55	—	—	—	81	—	—	UK: Gold
Playlist: The Very Best of John Denver	Release date: 2008; Label: Legacy Recordings	39	—	—	—	—	—	—	
The Ultimate Collection	Release date: 2011; Label: Sony BMG	—	—	—	—	34	—	5	UK: Platinum
The Classic Christmas Album	Release date: October 2, 2012; Label: RCA Records	32	—	—	—	—	—	—	
All of My Memories: The John Denver Collection	Release date: November 4, 2014; Label: Legacy Recordings	44	—	—	—	—	—	—	
The Windstar Greatest Hits	Release date: December 1, 2017; Label: Windstar	—	—	—	—	—	—	—	
Gold	Release date: December 8, 2019; Label: Banquet	—	—	—	—	—	—	41	
The Last Recordings	Release date: November 17, 2023; Label: Windstar	—	—	—	—	—	—	—	
"—" denotes releases that did not chart

== Collaboration albums ==
Title	Album details	Peak chart positions	
Title	Album details	US	CAN
Perhaps Love (with Plácido Domingo)	Release date: 1981; Label: CBS Masterworks	—	19
Rocky Mountain Holiday (with the Muppets)	Release date: May 1983; Label: RCA Records	202	—
"—" denotes releases that did not chart

== Singles ==
=== 1960s and 1970s ===
Year	Single	Peak chart positions								Certifications (sales threshold)	Album
Year	Single	US Country	US	US AC	AUS	CAN Country	CAN	CAN AC	UK	Certifications (sales threshold)	Album
1966	"Leaving on a Jet Plane"	—	—	—	—	—	—	—	—	UK: Silver; NZ: Gold	Rhymes & Reasons
1969	"Daydream"	—	—	—	—	—	—	—	—		Rhymes & Reasons
1970	"Anthem-Revelation"	—	—	—	—	—	—	—	—		Take Me to Tomorrow
1970	"Follow Me"	—	—	—	—	—	—	—	—		Take Me to Tomorrow
1970	"Sail Away Home"	—	—	—	—	—	—	—	—		Whose Garden Was This
1970	"Mr. Bojangles"	—	—	—	—	—	—	—	—		Whose Garden Was This
1971	"Take Me Home, Country Roads"	50	2	3	24	17	3	5	—	US: Platinum; NZ: 5× Platinum; UK: 3× Platinum	Poems, Prayers, and Promises
1971	"Friends with You"	—	47	4	73	—	34	5	—		Aerie
1972	"Everyday"	—	81	21	—	—	77	16	—		Aerie
1972	"Goodbye Again"	—	88	23	—	—	—	12	—		Rocky Mountain High
1972	"Hard Life, Hard Times (Prisoners)"	—	103	—	—	—	—	—	—		Rocky Mountain High
1972	"Rocky Mountain High"	—	9	3	39	—	8	2	—	NZ: Gold; UK: Silver	Rocky Mountain High
1972	"Victory Is Peace" (with Bill and Taffy Danoff)	—	—	—	—	—	—	—	—		—N/a
1973	"I'd Rather Be a Cowboy (Lady's Chains)"	—	62	25	—	67	75	58	—		Farewell Andromeda
1973	"Farewell, Andromeda (Welcome to My Morning)"	—	89	20	—	—	—	26	—		Farewell Andromeda
1973	"Please, Daddy"	69	69	—	—	68	82	—	—		Farewell Andromeda
1973	"Sunshine on My Shoulders"	42	1	1	40	—	1	2	—	US: Gold	Greatest Hits
1974	"Annie's Song"	9	1	1	5	3	1	1	1	US: Gold; UK: Platinum; NZ: Platinum	Back Home Again
1974	"Back Home Again"	1	5	1	20	1	10	1	—	US: Gold	Back Home Again
1974	"Sweet Surrender"	7	13	1	38	16	38	1	—		An Evening with John Denver
1975	"Thank God I'm a Country Boy"	1	1	5	41	1	1	1	—	US: Gold; NZ: Platinum	An Evening with John Denver
1975	"I'm Sorry"^{[B]}	1	1	1	7	4	1	1	—	US: Gold	Windsong
1975	"Fly Away" (with Olivia Newton-John)	12	13	1	—	28	13	2	—		Windsong
1976	"Looking for Space"	30	29	1	—	23	63	4	—		Windsong
1976	"It Makes Me Giggle"	70	60	9	—	39	83	22	—		Spirit
1976	"Like a Sad Song"	34	36	1	—	8	63	4	—		Spirit
1976	"Baby, You Look Good to Me Tonight"	22	65	13	—	20	89	15	—		Spirit
1977	"My Sweet Lady"	62	32	13	—	—	52	15	—		Greatest Hits 2
1977	"How Can I Leave You Again"	22	44	2	—	6	40	10	—		I Want to Live
1977	"I Want to Live"	—	55	10	—	—	81	9	—		I Want to Live
1977	"Bet on the Blues"	—	—	—	—	—	—	—	—		I Want to Live
1978	"It Amazes Me"	72	59	9	—	—	72	15	—		I Want to Live
1979	"Downhill Stuff"	64	106	—	—	—	—	—	—		John Denver
1979	"What's On Your Mind"	47	107	10	—	25	—	29	—		John Denver
1979	"Garden Song"	—	—	31	—	—	—	7	—		John Denver
"—" denotes releases that did not chart

=== 1980s-2010s ===
Year	Single	Peak chart positions						Album
Year	Single	US Country	US	US AC	AUS	CAN Country	CAN AC	Album
1980	"Autograph"	84	52	20	—	—	2	Autograph
1980	"Dancing with the Mountains"	—	97	43	—	—	—	Autograph
1981	"Some Days Are Diamonds (Some Days Are Stone)"	10	36	12	33	1	1	Some Days Are Diamonds
1981	"The Cowboy and the Lady"	50	66	—	—	—	—	Some Days Are Diamonds
1982	"Shanghai Breezes"	—	31	1	—	—	1	Seasons of the Heart
1982	"Seasons of the Heart"	—	78	23	—	—	16	Seasons of the Heart
1982	"Opposite Tables"	—	—	—	—	—	—	Seasons of the Heart
1983	"Wild Montana Skies" (with Emmylou Harris)	14	—	26	—	15	14	It's About Time
1983	"Hold On Tightly"	—	—	—	—	—	—	It's About Time
1984	"It's About Time"	—	—	—	—	—	—	It's About Time
1984	"Just a Dream Away"	—	—	—	—	—	—	—N/a
1984	"The Gold and Beyond"	—	—	—	—	—	—	Greatest Hits 3
1984	"Love Again" (with Sylvie Vartan)	—	85	30	—	—	21	Greatest Hits 3
1985	"Don't Close Your Eyes, Tonight"	—	—	37	—	—	—	Dreamland Express
1985	"Dreamland Express"	9	—	34	187	17	23	Dreamland Express
1986	"Along for the Ride ('56 T-Bird)"	57	—	—	—	—	—	One World
1986	"Let Us Begin (What Are We Making Weapons For?)"	—	—	—	—	—	—	One World
1986	"We Are One: Sister Cities"	—	—	—	—	—	—	—N/a
1988	"For You"	—	—	—	22	—	—	Higher Ground
1988	"Country Girl in Paris"	96	—	—	—	—	—	Higher Ground
1988	"Never a Doubt"	—	—	—	—	—	—	Higher Ground
1989	"The One World"	—	—	—	—	—	—	—N/a
1990	"The Flower That Shattered the Stone"	—	—	—	—	—	—	The Flower That Shattered the Stone
1990	"Eagles and Horses"	—	—	—	—	—	—	The Flower That Shattered the Stone
1990	"Wish You Were Here (Postcard from Paris)"	—	—	—	—	—	—	The Flower That Shattered the Stone
1992	"18 Holes"	—	—	—	—	—	—	—N/a
1995	"Calypso" (live)	—	—	—	—	—	—	The Wildlife Concert
1995	"For You" (live)	—	—	—	—	—	—	The Wildlife Concert
1996	"Perhaps Love (Liefde Is...)" (with Justine Pelmelay)	—	—	—	—	—	—	Love Again
2004	"Annie's Song/Follow Me"	—	—	—	—	—	—	A Song's Best Friend
2009	"Earth Day Every Day (Remix)"	—	—	—	—	—	—	—N/a
2017	"The Blizzard"	—	—	—	—	—	—	—N/a
"—" denotes releases that did not chart

== Other singles ==
=== Christmas singles ===
Year	Single	Peak chart positions			Album
Year	Single	US	CAN	CAN AC	Album
1975	"Christmas for Cowboys"	58	77	26	Rocky Mountain Christmas
1979	"A Baby Just Like You" (with the Muppets)	—	—	—	John Denver and the Muppets: A Christmas Together
"—" denotes releases that did not chart

=== Singles from collaboration albums ===
Year	Single	Artist	Peak chart positions				Album
Year	Single	Artist	US	US AC	AUS	UK	Album
1982	"Perhaps Love"	Plácido Domingo	59	22	28	46	Perhaps Love

=== Guest singles ===
Year	Single	Artist	Peak chart positions		Album
Year	Single	Artist	US Country	CAN Country	Album
1989	"And So It Goes"	The Nitty Gritty Dirt Band	14	29	Will the Circle Be Unbroken: Volume Two
2024	"Country Roads, Take Me Home (2024 Mix)"	Dzeko	—	—	

== Charted B-sides ==
Year	B-side	Peak chart positions			Original A-side
Year	B-side	US Country	US	CAN	Original A-side
1975	"Calypso"	—	2	29	"I'm Sorry"
1979	"Sweet Melinda"	flip	—	—	"What's On Your Mind"
"—" denotes releases that did not chart

== Notes ==
- A John Denver also peaked at number 7 on the RPM Country Albums chart in Canada.
- B B-side "Calypso", see charted B-side listing below.
