= Earth Songs =

Studio album by John Denver
- Released: June 1990
- Genre: Folk rock
- Length: 53:53
- Label: Windstar
- Producer: John Denver

John Denver chronology
Higher Ground (1988)	Earth Songs (1990)	The Flower That Shattered the Stone (1990)

Professional ratings
Review scores
Source	Rating
Allmusic	2.5/5 stars

Earth Songs is the twenty-first studio album by American singer-songwriter John Denver released in June 1990.

At the time of its release, it was only available by mail order and at John Denver's concerts. With the exception of tracks 7, 8, and 14 which are new songs; every other track on the album are new versions recorded specifically for this album. Each of those tracks are indicated with the name and year of the album on which they were first released. Tracks 7 and 8 were also released later in the year on The Flower That Shattered the Stone.

== Track listing ==
All songs were written by John Denver, unless stated otherwise.

Side one
No.	Title	Writer(s)	Length
1.	"Windsong" (from Windsong, 1975)	John Jarvis; Joe Henry	3:59
2.	"Rocky Mountain Suite (Cold Nights in Canada)" (from Farewell Andromeda, 1973)		3:28
3.	"Rocky Mountain High" (from Rocky Mountain High, 1972)	John Denver; Mike Taylor	4:11
4.	"Sunshine on My Shoulders" (from Poems, Prayers & Promises, 1971)	Denver; Dick Kniss; Taylor	5:06
5.	"The Eagle and the Hawk" (from Aerie, 1971)	Denver; Taylor	2:15
6.	"Eclipse" (from Back Home Again, 1974)		4:32
7.	"The Flower That Shattered the Stone"	Denver; Henry	2:54

Side two
No.	Title	Writer(s)	Length
8.	"Raven's Child"	Denver; Henry	4:14
9.	"Children of the Universe" (from Seasons of the Heart, 1982)	Denver; Henry	3:44
10.	"To the Wild Country" (from I Want to Live, 1977)		4:15
11.	"American Child" (from Autograph, 1980)		2:52
12.	"Calypso" (from Windsong)		3:48
13.	"Islands" (from Seasons of the Heart)		4:10
14.	"Earth Day Every Day (Celebrate)"		4:33
