= Christmas, Like a Lullaby =

- Delta Re-release

Studio album by John Denver
- Released: December 1990
- Genre: Christmas
- Length: 40:06
- Label: Windstar Records
- Producer: Roger Nichols, John Denver

John Denver chronology
The Flower That Shattered the Stone (1990)	Christmas, Like a Lullaby (1990)	Different Directions (1991)

Professional ratings
Review scores
Source	Rating
Allmusic	2/5 stars

Christmas, Like a Lullaby is the twenty-third studio album and second Christmas album by American singer-songwriter John Denver released in December 1990.

This was Denver's first solo Christmas album of music since 1975's Rocky Mountain Christmas. He also released the collaborative Christmas album A Christmas Together in 1979 with The Muppets.

The only original track was the title track "Christmas Like A Lullaby" written by Denver. The rest were Christmas carols and standards and two Tom Paxton songs, "The Children Of Bethlehem" and "Marvelous Toy".

== Track listing ==
=== Side one ===
1. "Christmas, Like a Lullaby" (John Denver) - 3:52
2. "The First Noel" (Traditional, Arrangement by John Denver) - 2:16
3. "Away in a Manger" (Traditional, Arrangement by John Denver) - 3:36
4. "The Children of Bethlehem" (Tom Paxton) - 3:31
5. "Jingle Bells" (James Lord Pierpont, new verses by Tom Paxton) - 2:43
6. "White Christmas" (Irving Berlin) - 2:37

=== Side two ===
1. "Marvelous Toy" (Tom Paxton) - 2:52
2. "Blue Christmas" (Billy Hayes, Jay W. Johnson) - 3:25
3. "Rudolph, the Red-Nosed Reindeer" (John D. Marks) - 3:12
4. "Little Drummer Boy" (Katherine K. Davis, Henry V. Onorati, Harry Simeone) - 3:22
5. "Mary's Little Boy Child" (Jester Hairston) - 3:20
6. "The Christmas Song (Chestnuts Roasting On An Open Fire)" (Melvin H. Tormé, Robert Wells) - 4:05
7. "Have Yourself a Merry Little Christmas" (Ralph Blaine, Hugh Martin) - 2:15

There is a 1999 reissue by Delta Entertainment.

== Personnel ==
- John Denver – acoustic guitar, vocals
- James Burton – electric guitar
- Glen Hardin – keyboards
- Jim Horn – saxophone, flute, recorder
- Jerry Carrigan – drums
- Jerry Scheff – bass
- Machito Sanchez – percussion
