= John Denver's Greatest Hits, Volume 2 =

John Denver's Greatest Hits Volume 2

Greatest hits album by John Denver
- Released: March 1977
- Length: 43:15
- Label: RCA Victor
- Producer: Milton Okun

John Denver chronology
Spirit (1976)	John Denver's Greatest Hits Volume 2 (1977)	I Want to Live (1977)

Professional ratings
Review scores
Source	Rating
AllMusic	4.5/5 stars
Christgau's Record Guide	D+

John Denver's Greatest Hits Volume 2 is a compilation album by American singer-songwriter John Denver, released in 1977. The single released from this album is "My Sweet Lady." It peaked at No. 13 on the adult contemporary chart, No. 32 on the pop chart, and No. 62 on the country chart in the United States.

As with his previous Greatest Hits album, Denver re-recorded many of his hits instead of using the original recordings.

In 1982, the album was re-released with a different cover in many countries. On this release, "Welcome to My Morning" was replaced with the duet version of "Perhaps Love," as performed with Placido Domingo. On some versions of this international album the song "Some Days Are Diamonds" was also added to the set list.

== Track listing ==
All tracks written by John Denver except where noted.

Side one
No.	Title	Writer(s)	Length
1.	"Annie's Song" (from Back Home Again, 1974)		2:58
2.	"Welcome to My Morning (Farewell Andromeda)" (new recording; from Farewell Andromeda, 1973)		3:15
3.	"Fly Away" (from Windsong, 1975)		4:08
4.	"Like a Sad Song" (new recording; original from Spirit, 1976)		4:04
5.	"Looking for Space" (from Windsong)		3:56
6.	"Thank God I'm a Country Boy" (live version from An Evening with John Denver, 1975, original version from Back Home Again)	John Martin Sommers	3:18
Total length:			21:39

Side two
No.	Title	Writer(s)	Length
1.	"Grandma's Feather Bed" (new recording; original version from Back Home Again)	Jim Connor	2:07
2.	"Back Home Again" (from Back Home Again)		4:42
3.	"I'm Sorry" (from Windsong)		3:29
4.	"My Sweet Lady" (new recording; from Poems, Prayers, and Promises, 1971)		4:47
5.	"Calypso" (from Windsong)		3:32
6.	"This Old Guitar" (new recording; from Back Home Again)		2:59
Total length:			21:36

== Personnel ==
=== Musicians ===
- John Denver - vocals, 6 & 12 string guitars
- John Sommers - acoustic guitar, banjo, fiddle, mandolin
- Steve Weisberg - electric & acoustic guitars, dobro, pedal steel guitar
- Dick Kniss - bass
- Hal Blaine - drums, percussion
- Lee Holdridge - conductor
- Olivia Newton-John sings on "Fly Away"

=== Technical personnel ===
- Milton Okun - production
- Kris O'Connor - assistant producer
- Lee Holdridge - orchestral arrangements
- Mickey Crofford - recording engineer
- Artie Torgersen, Dennis Smith - assistant engineers
- Richard Simpson - mastering

== Charts ==
Chart (1977)	Peak position
Australia (Kent Music Report)	49

== Certifications ==
Region	Certification	Certified units/sales
Australia (ARIA)	2× Platinum	140,000^{^}
Canada (Music Canada)	Gold	50,000^{^}
United States (RIAA)	2× Platinum	2,000,000^{^}
^{^} Shipments figures based on certification alone.
