= The Best of John Denver =

The Best of John Denver may refer to the following albums by American singer-songwriter John Denver:

- John Denver's Greatest Hits (also released as "The Best of John Denver"), a 1973 compilation
- The Very Best of John Denver, a 1994 compilation
