= Forever, John =

Compilation album by John Denver
- Released: September 29, 1998
- Genre: Folk
- Length: 41:35
- Label: RCA Records

John Denver chronology
All Aboard! (1997)	Forever, John (1998)

Professional ratings
Review scores
Source	Rating
Allmusic	4/5 stars

Forever, John is a compilation album of previously unreleased songs and alternate takes recorded 1969–1980 by American singer-songwriter John Denver. It was released posthumously in September 1998.

== Track listing ==
1. "On the Wings of an Eagle" (previously unreleased from 1980)
2. "River" (previously unreleased from 1980)
3. "Rusty Green" (previously unreleased from 1969)
4. "Rita Ballou" (previously unreleased from 1980)
5. "Four Strong Winds" (previously unreleased from 1980)
6. "No One" (previously unreleased from 1971)
7. "Dance Little Jean" (previously unreleased from 1980)
8. "High Wind Blowin'" (previously unreleased from 1980)
9. "It's a Sin to Tell a Lie" (previously unreleased from 1973)
10. "Mr. Bojangles" (early alternate version than the recording used on Whose Garden Was This)
11. "Nobody Can Take My Dreams From Me" (previously unreleased from 1980)
12. "The Game Is Over" (early alternate version than the recording used on Whose Garden Was This)
