= Different Directions (John Denver album) =

Studio album by John Denver
- Released: September 24, 1991
- Genre: Folk
- Length: 44:08
- Label: Windstar
- Producer: John Denver

John Denver chronology
Christmas, Like a Lullaby (1990)	Different Directions (1991)	The Very Best of John Denver (1994)

Professional ratings
Review scores
Source	Rating
Allmusic	3/5 stars

Different Directions is the twenty-fourth studio album by American singer-songwriter John Denver released in September 1991. Notably, three of the album's nine songs were written by Joe Camilleri and Nick Smith, and initially recorded by The Black Sorrows on their 1988 album Hold On to Me.

== Track listing ==
=== Side one ===
1. "Potter's Wheel" (Bill Danoff)
2. "Ponies" (Jeffrey Hawthornee Bullock)
3. "The Foxfire Suite, Spring Is Alive, You Are…, Whisper the Wind, Spring Is Alive (Reprise)" (Denver)
4. "Chained to the Wheel" (Joe Camilleri, Nick Smith)

=== Side two ===
1. "Two Different Directions" (Denver)
2. "Hold On To Me" (Joe Camilleri, Nick Smith)
3. "The Chosen Ones" (Joe Camilleri, Nick Smith)
4. "Amazon (Let This Be a Voice)" (Denver)
5. "Tenderly Calling" (Jan Camp Garrett)

== Personnel ==
- John Denver – vocals, guitar, mandolin
- James Burton – guitar
- Emory Gordy Jr. – bass, mandolin
- Glen D. Hardin – keyboards
- Jim Horn – saxophone, flute, recorder
- Jim Salestrom - banjo, backing vocals
- Gordon Burt - fiddle
- Richie Gajate Garcia - drums, percussion
