= Love Again (John Denver album) =

Studio album by John Denver
- Released: 1996
- Recorded: September 1996
- Label: CMC

John Denver chronology
The Very Best of John Denver (1994)	Love Again (1996)	All Aboard! (1997)

Professional ratings
Review scores
Source	Rating
AllMusic	4/5 stars

Love Again is the twenty-fifth studio album by American singer-songwriter John Denver released in 1996. It was released by CMC Records.

It is alternatively known as The Unplugged Collection and A Celebration of Life (1943–1997). A Celebration of Life (1943–1997), however, consists of only twelve of the sixteen tracks included on the other versions and in an altered sequence.

The album was recorded in September 1996 and featured new renditions of many of Denver's most popular songs.

== Track listing ==
(Love Again and The Unplugged Collection)

1. "Annie's Song"
2. "Perhaps Love"
3. "Dreamland Express"
4. "Rocky Mountain High"
5. "Seasons of the Heart"
6. "Whispering Jesse"
7. "Take Me Home, Country Roads"
8. "For You"
9. "Windsong"
10. "Leaving on a Jet Plane"
11. "I'm Sorry"
12. "Back Home Again"
13. "Sunshine on My Shoulders"
14. "Thank God I'm a Country Boy"
15. "Christmas for Cowboys"
16. "Love Again"

== Track listing ==
(A Celebration of Life (1943–1997))

1. "Whispering Jesse"
2. "Dreamland Express"
3. "Rocky Mountain High"
4. "Take Me Home, Country Roads"
5. "Christmas for Cowboys"
6. "Love Again"
7. "Sunshine on My Shoulders"
8. "Perhaps Love"
9. "Leaving on a Jet Plane"
10. "Windsong"
11. "I'm Sorry"
12. "Back Home Again"

== Charts ==
Weekly chart performance for Love Again
Chart (1996)	Peak position
Australian Albums (ARIA)	118
