= When the River Meets the Sea =

Song by Paul Williams

Song by John Denver and The Muppets

from the album A Christmas Together
- Released: October 1979
- Genre: Christmas music
- Length: 2:43
- Label: RCA Victor
- Songwriter: Paul Williams
- Producer: Milton Okun

"When the River Meets the Sea" is a song written by composer and lyricist Paul Williams for Jim Henson's 1977 TV special Emmet Otter's Jug-Band Christmas. Emmet Otter, the title character, and his mother, Alice Otter sang this song together. The song was later sung by John Denver and Robin the Frog on the 1979 album John Denver and the Muppets: A Christmas Together.

Though written for one Christmas story and featured in another, the lyrics are not holiday-related, but symbolic of death as a peaceful transition to an afterlife.

The song was performed by Jerry Nelson (the puppeteer of both Emmet Otter and Robin the Frog) and Louise Gold at Henson's memorial service in New York on May 21, 1990.

Robin, over 21 years later, (this time, being performed by Matt Vogel) sang this song with Jimmy Fallon and his Uncle Kermit (Steve Whitmire) on Late Night with Jimmy Fallon.
