= John Denver's Greatest Hits =

Greatest hits album by John Denver
- Released: November 1973
- Recorded: 1971–1973
- Genre: Folk; country
- Length: 39:36
- Label: RCA Victor
- Producer: Milton Okun

John Denver chronology
Farewell Andromeda (1973)	John Denver's Greatest Hits (1973)	Back Home Again (1974)

Singles from John Denver's Greatest Hits
- 1. "Sunshine on My Shoulders" Released: October 22, 1973

Professional ratings
Review scores
Source	Rating
AllMusic	4.5/5 stars
Christgau's Record Guide	B−
Rolling Stone Record Guide	2/5 stars

John Denver's Greatest Hits is the first greatest hits album by American singer-songwriter John Denver, released in November 1973 by RCA Records. A version known as The Best of John Denver with the same track listing was released in some countries.

== History ==
The collection included material from his earlier days as a songwriter (going back to 1965 on "For Bobbie") to his later hit "Rocky Mountain High". By the time of its release, Denver had had only two top 40 hits. So many of the songs on Greatest Hits were not hits per se, but as Stephen Thomas Erlewine wrote for Allmusic, "songs that defined him."

Greatest Hits is historically important because it contained new and reimagined recordings of several songs. Notable new versions included "Leaving on a Jet Plane", "Starwood in Aspen", "Follow Me", "Rhymes and Reasons", "The Eagle and the Hawk", "Sunshine on My Shoulders" and "Poems, Prayers, and Promises".

After its release these versions were used for airplay despite differing in subtle but important ways from the original versions; generally, they were more polished, featured a more mature-sounding Denver, included strings, and were extended somewhat.

Denver explained this in the liner notes by saying that he had picked the tunes most requested at his concerts, but that "I felt that some of these songs had grown a bit, that I am singing better than I was four or five years ago, and that I would like to treat some of the songs a little differently than I had in the original recordings."

Within a few months of release, Greatest Hits became Denver's first #1 on the Billboard 200 pop albums chart. It remains the best-selling album of his career in the United States, being certified 9× platinum by the RIAA. The album was one of the first to sell over ten million copies worldwide. It spent 176 weeks on the Billboard 200 and 110 weeks on the Canadian RPM Top 100 chart.

== Track listing ==
All tracks produced by Milton Okun; all tracks written by John Denver.

Side one
No.	Title	Writer(s)	Length
1.	"Take Me Home, Country Roads" (from Poems, Prayers & Promises, 1971)	Bill Danoff; Taffy Nivert; John Denver	3:08
2.	"Follow Me" (new recording; from Take Me to Tomorrow, 1970)		2:56
3.	"Starwood in Aspen" (new recording; from Aerie, 1971)		3:10
4.	"For Baby (For Bobbie)" (from Rocky Mountain High, 1972)		2:58
5.	"Rhymes and Reasons" (new recording; from Rhymes & Reasons, 1969)		3:11
6.	"Leaving on a Jet Plane" (new recording; from Rhymes & Reasons)		4:00
Total length:			19:23

Side two
No.	Title	Writer(s)	Length
1.	"The Eagle and the Hawk" (new recording; from Aerie)	Denver; Mike Taylor	2:10
2.	"Sunshine on My Shoulders" (new recording; from Poems, Prayers & Promises)	Denver; Dick Kniss; Taylor	5:10
3.	"Goodbye Again" (from Rocky Mountain High)		3:36
4.	"Poems, Prayers and Promises" (new recording; from Poems, Prayers & Promises)		4:34
5.	"Rocky Mountain High" (from Rocky Mountain High)	Denver; Taylor	4:43
Total length:			20:13

== Charts ==
=== Weekly charts ===
Chart (1973–76)	Peak position
Australian Albums (Kent Music Report)	4
Canadian Albums (RPM)	1
New Zealand Albums (RMNZ)	17
US Billboard 200	1
UK Albums (OCC)	7
Chart (2019)	Peak position
US Top Country Albums (Billboard)	47

=== Year-end charts ===
Chart (1974)	Position
Australian Albums (Kent Music Report)	25
Canadian Albums (RPM)	9
Chart (1975)	Position
Australian Albums (Kent Music Report)	20
Canadian Albums (RPM)	60
New Zealand Albums (RMNZ)	20
Chart (1976)	Position
UK Albums (OCC)	50

== Certifications ==
Region	Certification	Certified units/sales
Australia (ARIA)	Platinum	70,000^{^}
Hong Kong (IFPI Hong Kong)	Gold	10,000^{*}
United Kingdom (BPI)	Silver	60,000^{‡}
United States (RIAA)	9× Platinum	9,000,000^{^}
^{*} Sales figures based on certification alone.^{^} Shipments figures based on certification alone.^{‡} Sales+streaming figures based on certification alone.

== Personnel ==
For the newly recorded tracks:

- John Denver – vocals, acoustic guitar
- Eric Weissberg – guitars, banjo
- Dick Kniss – bass
- Frank Owens – piano
- Herb Lovelle – drums
- Gary Chester – percussion

== See also ==
- List of best-selling albums in the United States
