= Garden Song =

Children's song written by David Mallett

Song
- Released: 1975
- Songwriter: David Mallett

"Garden Song"

Single by John Denver

from the album John Denver
- B-side: "Berkeley Woman"
- Released: June 1979
- Recorded: 1979
- Label: RCA
- Songwriter: David Mallett
- Producers: Milton Okun; Kris O'Conner (Assistant Producer)

John Denver - "Garden Song"
A 20 second sample of the song.

"Garden Song" is a popular children's song and American folk song written by David Mallett in 1975.

The song has been recorded by Paul Stookey of Peter, Paul and Mary, John Denver, Pete Seeger, Fred Penner, Makem and Clancy, Raffi Cavoukian, John Lithgow, Arlo Guthrie, Elizabeth Mitchell, Charlotte Diamond, as well as the Muppets. The version of "Garden Song" covered by John Denver made the national charts. His version reached number 7 on the Canadian AC charts.

A picture book version of the song call Inch by Inch: The Garden Song was also created.
