= Rocky Mountain Christmas =

Studio album by John Denver
- Released: October 1, 1975
- Recorded: July 22 – September 18, 1975
- Genre: Christmas, folk
- Length: 30:31; 41:22 (1998 edition); 33:58 (2005 edition)
- Label: RCA Victor
- Producer: Milton Okun

John Denver chronology
Windsong (1975)	Rocky Mountain Christmas (1975)	Spirit (1976)

Professional ratings
Review scores
Source	Rating
Allmusic	4.5/5 stars

Rocky Mountain Christmas is the tenth studio album and first Christmas album by American singer-songwriter John Denver, released in October 1975 by RCA Records.

His first Christmas-themed release, the album includes renditions of several traditional carols and popular Christmas standards; re-recorded versions of two songs from earlier Denver albums, "Aspenglow" from Take Me to Tomorrow and "Please, Daddy (Don't Get Drunk This Christmas)" from Farewell Andromeda; and the newly penned compositions "Christmas for Cowboys" and "A Baby Just Like You"; these two songs, along with five others including "Aspenglow", were featured in Denver's TV special of the same name that aired December 10, 1975 on ABC.

The single from the album, "Christmas for Cowboys", became a minor hit in the US (#58 pop) and Canada (#77 pop, No. 26 AC).

== Track listing ==
Side one
No.	Title	Writer(s)	Length
1.	"Aspenglow"	John Denver	2:21
2.	"The Christmas Song (Chestnuts Roasting on an Open Fire)"	Mel Tormé; Robert Wells	3:13
3.	"Rudolph the Red-Nosed Reindeer"	Johnny Marks	1:46
4.	"Silver Bells"	Jay Livingston; Ray Evans	2:10
5.	"Please, Daddy (Don't Get Drunk This Christmas)"	Bill Danoff; Taffy Danoff	2:34
6.	"Christmas for Cowboys"	Steve Weisberg	2:29
Total length:			14:33

Side two
No.	Title	Writer(s)	Length
1.	"Away in a Manger"	James Ramsey Murray; Denver^{[a]}	2:05
2.	"What Child Is This"	Traditional; William Chatterton Dix; Denver^{[a]}	2:33
3.	"Coventry Carol"	Traditional; Denver^{[a]}	2:19
4.	"Oh Holy Night"	Adolphe Adam; Placide Cappeau; John Sullivan Dwight; Denver^{[a]}	2:53
5.	"Silent Night, Holy Night"	Franz Xaver Gruber; Joseph Mohr; John Freeman Young; Denver^{[a]}	3:28
6.	"A Baby Just Like You"	Denver; Joe Henry	2:40
Total length:			15:58

Bonus tracks on 1998 CD edition
No.	Title	Writer(s)	Length
13.	"Jingle Bells"	James Lord Pierpont; Denver^{[b]}	1:06
14.	"White Christmas"	Irving Berlin	2:21
15.	"The Music Is You"	Denver	1:27
16.	"Perhaps Love"	Denver	1:52
17.	"Dreamland Express"	Denver	4:05
Total length:			41:22

Bonus tracks on 2005 CD edition
No.	Title	Writer(s)	Length
13.	"Jingle Bells"	James Lord Pierpont; Denver^{[b]}	1:06
14.	"White Christmas"	Irving Berlin	2:21
Total length:			33:58

Notes

- ^{^a} signifies arranged and adapted by
- ^{^b} signifies adapted by

== Personnel ==
- John Denver – vocals and 12-string guitars
- Dick Kniss – bass
- Lee Holdridge – piano, celeste, harpsichord and tack piano
- Steve Weisberg – guitar
- John Sommers – guitar and mandolin
- Hal Blaine – drums and percussion
- Herbie Lovelle – drums
- George Marge – oboe and English horn on "Silver Bells"
- Harvey Estrin – flute on "Silver Bells"
- Sid Sharp – violin
- William Kurasch – violin
- Samuel Boghossian – viola
- Jesse Erhlich – cello
- Pearl Kaufman – piano and harpsichord play on "Coventry Carol," "What Child Is This," and "Oh Holy Night"
- Chuck Collazzi – plays guitar on "What Child Is This"

Technical

- Kris O'Connor – assistant producer
- Mickey Crofford – engineer
- Acy Lehman – art direction
- Peter Palombi – illustration

== Charts ==
Chart (1975)	Peak position
Australia (Kent Music Report)	40
