= John Denver and the Muppets: A Christmas Together =

1979 Christmas television special

- Title card
- Genre: Television special
- Created by: Jim Henson
- Written by: Herbert Baker; Bob Finkel; Jon Stone
- Directed by: Tony Charmoli
- Starring: John Denver; Muppet performers: Jim Henson; Frank Oz; Jerry Nelson; Richard Hunt; Dave Goelz; Steve Whitmire
- Country of origin: United States

Production
- Executive producer: Jerry Weintraub
- Producer: Bob Finkel
- Running time: 50 minutes
- Production company: Henson Associates

Original release
- Network: ABC
- Release: December 5, 1979

John Denver and the Muppets: A Christmas Together is a 1979 Christmas television special starring Jim Henson's Muppets and singer-songwriter John Denver. The special first aired December 5, 1979, on ABC. It has never been released on any standard home video format but the special is available for viewing at the Paley Center for Media, alongside other Muppet specials.

== Plot ==
The special opens with Denver and the Muppets singing "The Twelve Days of Christmas". To add comedic effect, Fozzie Bear forgets his line ("Seven swans a-swimming.") and Miss Piggy overemphasizes hers ("Five gold rings, ba-dum, bum, bum.")

The main plot of the rest of the special is the creation of a Christmas-themed special (featuring Denver and the Muppet cast) and a musical number for Miss Piggy. During the discussion of her number, Miss Piggy confronts Denver in her dressing room about their presumably mutual attraction. Miss Piggy, as a doll named Fifi, sings "I Will Wait for You" to Denver, who plays a wooden soldier trying to stay in step with a line of marching wooden soldiers.

The program concludes with Denver reciting the story of Jesus' birth (depicted by Muppet versions of Joseph, Mary, and other characters) and joining the Muppets to sing "Stille Nacht/Silent Night" (first in German, then in English) while the children in the audience join in.

== Cast ==
John Denver and the Muppets: A Christmas Together

- John Denver as himself

=== Muppet performers ===
- Jim Henson as Kermit the Frog, Rowlf the Dog, Dr. Teeth, The Swedish Chef, Waldorf, and Link Hogthrob
- Frank Oz as Miss Piggy, Fozzie Bear, and Animal
- Jerry Nelson as Robin the Frog, Floyd Pepper, and Lew Zealand
- Richard Hunt as Scooter, Janice, Statler, and Beaker
- Dave Goelz as Gonzo the Great, Dr. Bunsen Honeydew, and Zoot

== Soundtrack album ==
A Christmas Together

Soundtrack album by John Denver and The Muppets
- Released: October 1979
- Genre: Christmas music
- Length: 35:25
- Label: RCA Victor
- Producer: Milton Okun

John Denver chronology
John Denver (1979)	A Christmas Together (1979)	Autograph (1980)

Professional ratings
Review scores
Source	Rating
Allmusic	3/5 stars

The soundtrack album of the same name has 13 tracks of traditional Christmas carols and original songs. This album, originally released by RCA Records in October 1979, was reissued on compact disc by Denver's own Windstar label in 1990 and again by LaserLight Digital in 1998; LaserLight issued it once again in 2001, this time as an abridged 10-track version; the original full-length CD was subsequently reissued in its entirety in 2006 (the previously missing tracks are "Have Yourself a Merry Little Christmas", "When the River Meets the Sea", and "Little Saint Nick"). All releases of the album contain an alternate recording of "The Twelve Days of Christmas" from that featured in the TV special, along with their rendition of "Christmas Is Coming".

"Have Yourself a Merry Little Christmas", "We Wish You a Merry Christmas", and "A Baby Just Like You" was released as a red vinyl 45 rpm single (RCA PB-11767), while "The Peace Carol", "We Wish You a Merry Christmas", and "Deck the Halls" were issued on a radio-only promo single (RCA PB-9463).

A sheet music edition contains most of the songs and the musical scores.

=== Track listing ===
1
No.	Title	Writer(s)	Performer(s)	Length
1.	"Twelve Days Of Christmas"	Traditional; Frederic Austin; Milt Okun^{[a]}	John Denver and The Muppets	4:23
2.	"Have Yourself a Merry Little Christmas"	Hugh Martin; Ralph Blane	Rowlf the Dog and Denver	1:50
3.	"The Peace Carol"	Traditional; Bob Beers^{[a]}	Denver and Scooter with the Muppets	2:47
4.	"Christmas Is Coming"	Traditional; Beers^{[a]}	Miss Piggy with Scooter, The Great Gonzo and Robin the Frog	1:13
5.	"A Baby Just Like You"	John Denver; Joe Henry	Denver with the Muppets	2:54
6.	"Deck the Halls"	Traditional / Thomas Oliphant; Okun^{[a]}	The Muppets	1:37
7.	"When the River Meets the Sea"	Paul Williams	Robin the Frog and Denver with the Muppets	2:43

2
No.	Title	Writer(s)	Performer(s)	Length
1.	"Little Saint Nick"	Brian Wilson; Mike Love^{[b]}	Dr. Teeth and the Electric Mayhem	2:22
2.	"Noel: Christmas Eve, 1913"	Robert Bridges; Lee Holdridge	Denver	2:52
3.	"The Christmas Wish"	Danny Wheetman	Kermit the Frog with the Muppets	3:27
4.	"Alfie, the Christmas Tree / Carol for a Christmas Tree / It's in Every One of Us" (medley)	Denver / Holdridge / David Pomeranz	Denver with the Muppets	4:34
5.	"Silent Night"	Franz Xaver Gruber, Joseph Mohr, John Freeman Young; Okun^{[a]}	Denver with the Muppets	3:09
6.	"We Wish You a Merry Christmas"	Traditional; Okun^{[a]}	Denver with the Muppets	1:05

==== Notes ====
- ^{^a} signifies arranged by
- ^{^b} Mike Love was added to the credits for "Little Saint Nick" after a 1994 court case.

=== Personnel ===
The following credits are sourced from liner notes included with the album release:

- John Denver – lead and harmony vocals, acoustic guitar, 12-string guitar, arranger

==== Muppet performers ====
- Dave Goelz – lead and harmony vocals
- Louise Gold – harmony vocals
- Jim Henson – lead and harmony vocals
- Richard Hunt – lead and harmony vocals
- Kathryn Mullen – harmony vocals
- Jerry Nelson – lead and harmony vocals
- Frank Oz – lead and harmony vocals
- Steve Whitmire – harmony vocals

==== Session musicians ====
- Hal Blaine – drums, percussion, arranger
- Denny Brooks – acoustic guitar, arranger
- James Burton – acoustic guitar, electric guitar, dobro, arranger
- Ray Charles – vocal arranger
- Emory Gordy Jr. – bass guitar, arranger
- Glen D. Hardin – piano, electric piano, electric organ, celesta, arranger
- Lee Holdridge – orchestra arranger
- Jim Horn – flute, tin whistle, alto flute, bass flute, baritone saxophone, arranger
- Herb Pedersen – acoustic guitar, electric guitar, banjo, arranger
- Danny Wheetman – mandolin, harmonica, arranger

== See also ==
- List of Christmas films
