= The Flower That Shattered the Stone =

Studio album by John Denver
- Released: September 1990
- Length: 50:19
- Label: Windstar
- Producer: John Denver, Roger Nichols

John Denver chronology
Earth Songs (1990)	The Flower That Shattered the Stone (1990)	Christmas, Like a Lullaby (1990)

Professional ratings
Review scores
Source	Rating
Allmusic	2/5 stars

The Flower That Shattered the Stone is the twenty-second studio album by American singer-songwriter John Denver. It was released in September 1990.

This release consists of nine tracks taken from Denver's 21st studio album, Stonehaven Sunrise (an Australian only release in 1989); two tracks taken from his 22nd studio album, Earth Songs; and a song from a Japan-only single, "The Flower That Shattered The Stone (reprise)". Some tracks were slightly remixed for this album.

== Track listing ==
Side one
No.	Title	Writer(s)	Length
1.	"The Flower That Shattered the Stone"	John Jarvis; Joe Henry	2:54
2.	"Thanks to You"	John Denver; Johnny Christopher; Sam Hogin; Conrad Reeder	3:59
3.	"Postcard from Paris"	Denver; Jimmy Webb	3:29
4.	"High, Wide and Handsome"	Chuck Pyle	3:22
5.	"Eagles and Horses"	Denver; Henry	4:46
6.	"A Little Further North"	Denver; Graeme Connors	6:08

Side two
No.	Title	Writer(s)	Length
7.	"Raven's Child"	Denver; Henry	4:14
8.	"Ancient Rhymes"	Denver; Bob Samples	3:06
9.	"The Gift You Are"	Denver	4:46
10.	"I Watch You Sleeping"	Mike Batt	4:57
11.	"Stonehaven Sunset"	Denver	5:54
12.	"The Flower That Shattered the Stone (Reprise)" (feat. Kosetsu Minami)	Jarvis; Henry	2:53

== Track listing for Stonehaven Sunrise (1989) ==
No.	Title	Writer(s)	Length
1.	"High, Wide and Handsome"	Chuck Pyle	3:22
2.	"Thanks to You"	John Denver; Johnny Christopher; Sam Hogin; Conrad Reeder	4:07
3.	"You're Still the One for Me" (sung by Cassandra Delaney-Denver)	Richard Riesser; Robert Alsterberg	3:15
4.	"And So It Goes (Note: This song was released in the U.S. on the Nitty Gritty Dirt Band's 1989 album Will the Circle Be Unbroken: Volume Two.)" (feat. the Nitty Gritty Dirt Band)	Don Schlitz; Paul Overstreet	3:33
5.	"Wish You Were Here (Postcard Du Paris)"	Denver; Jimmy Webb	3:29
6.	"A Little Further North Each Year"	Denver; Graeme Connors	6:04
7.	"Ancient Rhymes"	Denver; Bob Samples	3:04
8.	"The Gift You Are"	Denver	4:42
9.	"I Watch You Sleeping"	Mike Batt	4:57
10.	"Eagles and Horses (I'm Flying Again)"	Denver; Joe Henry	4:45
11.	"Stonehaven Sunset"	Denver	5:48

== Charts ==
Weekly chart performance for Stonehaven Sunrise
Chart (1989)	Peak position
Australian Albums (ARIA)	113
