= Dreamland Express (song) =

Single by John Denver

from the album Dreamland Express
- B-side: "African Sunrise"
- Released: November 1985
- Genre: Country rock, soft rock
- Length: 4:03
- Label: RCA
- Songwriter(s): John Denver
- Producer(s): Roger Nichols

John Denver singles chronology
"Don't Close Your Eyes, Tonight" (1985)	"Dreamland Express" (1985)	"Along for the Ride ('56 T-Bird)" (1986)

"Dreamland Express" is a song written and recorded by American singer-songwriter John Denver. It was released in November 1985 as the second single from the album of the same name. The song was a minor crossover hit and peaked at number 9 on the Billboard Hot Country Singles chart (his final Top 10 hit to date) and number 34 on the Adult Contemporary chart.

The song is the last track on the 1998 reissue of Rocky Mountain Christmas.

== Chart performance ==
Chart (1985–1986)	Peak position
US Hot Country Songs (Billboard)	9
US Adult Contemporary (Billboard)	34
Canadian RPM Country Tracks	17
Canadian RPM Adult Contemporary Tracks	23
