= All Aboard! (John Denver album) =

Studio album by John Denver
- Released: August 26, 1997
- Genre: Folk, children's music
- Length: 38:14
- Label: Sony
- Producer: Roger Nichols

John Denver chronology
Love Again (1997)	All Aboard! (1997)	Forever, John (1998)

Professional ratings
Review scores
Source	Rating
AllMusic	2.5/5 stars

All Aboard! is the twenty-sixth and final studio album by American singer-songwriter John Denver, released in August 1997. Denver died in a plane crash two months after its release.

== Style ==
The album consists of old fashioned swing, big band, folk, bluegrass and gospel styles of music woven into a theme of railroad songs.

== Accolades ==
All Aboard! won a posthumous Grammy for Best Musical Album for Children.

== Track listing ==
1. "Jenny Dreamed of Trains" (Guy Clark, Vince Gill)
2. "Freight Train Boogie/Choo Choo Ch'boogie" (medley) (Ken Griffin, Vaughn Horton, Denver Darling, Milton Gabler)
3. "Steel Rails" (Louisa Branscomb)
4. "Waiting for a Train" (Jimmie Rodgers)
5. "I've Been Working on the Railroad" (Traditional)
6. "On the Atchison, Topeka and the Santa Fe" (Johnny Mercer, Harry Warren)
7. "Old Train" (Herb Pedersen)
8. "Daddy, What's a Train?" (Bruce Phillips)
9. "The Little Engine That Could" (William May, Warren Foster)
10. "Last Train Done Gone Down" (Peter Rowan)
11. "Last Hobo" (George Allen)
12. "People Get Ready" (Curtis Mayfield)
13. "Lining Track" (With Waylon Jennings) (Lead Belly)
14. "City of New Orleans" (Steve Goodman)
15. "Jessie Dreamed of Trains" (Guy Clark, Vince Gill, John Denver)

== Charts ==
Weekly chart performance for All Aboard!
Chart (1997)	Peak position
Australian Albums (ARIA)	158
