= John Denver (album) =

Studio album by John Denver
- Released: January 1979
- Recorded: 1978
- Length: 37:47
- Label: RCA Victor
- Producer: Milton Okun; Assistant Producer: Kris O'Connor

John Denver chronology
I Want to Live (1977)	John Denver (1979)	John Denver and the Muppets: A Christmas Together (1979)

Professional ratings
Review scores
Source	Rating
Allmusic	3/5 stars

John Denver is the thirteenth studio album by American singer-songwriter John Denver released in January 1979. It contains a live version of "Berkeley Woman" which was found in its original studio version on Farewell Andromeda.

This album was re-released in 1998 with bonus tracks.

== Track listing ==
All songs by John Denver unless otherwise noted.

=== Side one ===
1. "Downhill Stuff" – 3:32
2. "Sweet Melinda" (Steve Gillette, Dave Mackechnie) – 2:27
3. "What’s on Your Mind" – 4:26
4. "Joseph and Joe" – 3:37
5. "Life Is So Good" – 1:56
6. "Berkeley Woman" (Bryan Bowers) – recorded live during John Denver's spring tour of 1978; the only live track on the album – 4:10

=== Side two ===
1. "Johnny B. Goode" (Chuck Berry) – 3:02
2. "You’re So Beautiful" – 3:09
3. "Southwind" (Herb Pedersen) – 3:27
4. "Garden Song" (David Mallett) – 2:38
5. "Songs of…" – 5:23

== Personnel and album dedication ==
- John Denver – guitar, vocals
- Hal Blaine – percussion
- James Burton – guitar
- Emory Gordy Jr. – bass
- Glen Hardin – piano
- Jim Horn – flute, piccolo, reeds
- Herb Pedersen – banjo, guitar
- Renee Armand-Horn – vocals
- Denny Brooks – guitar
- Danny Wheetman – fiddle, harmonica

Original album artwork gave the following album dedication:
"I would like to dedicate this album to the musicians and the singers.
Hal Blaine – James Burton – Emory Gordy, Jr. – Glen D. Hardin – Jim Horn – Herb Pedersen – Renee Armand-Horn – Denny Brooks – Danny Wheetman"

== Re-release in 1998 with bonus tracks ==
The John Denver album was re-released in 1998 with five bonus tracks. These tracks were originally released in 1970 as Side 1 of the “Whose Garden Was This” album.
All songs by John Denver unless otherwise noted.

=== Bonus tracks ===
1. "Tremble If You Must" (Paul Potash)
2. "Sail Away Home"
3. "The Night They Drove Old Dixie Down" (Robbie Robertson)
4. "Mr. Bojangles" (Jerry Jeff Walker)
5. "I Wish I Could Have Been There (Woodstock)"

== Charts ==
Chart (1979)	Peak position
Australia (Kent Music Report)	94
