= Spirit (John Denver album) =

Studio album by John Denver
- Released: August 9, 1976
- Genres: Country, folk
- Length: 40:45
- Label: RCA
- Producer: Milton Okun

John Denver chronology
Rocky Mountain Christmas (1975)	Spirit (1976)	John Denver's Greatest Hits, Volume 2 (1977)

Singles from Spirit
- 1. "Like A Sad Song" Released: August 1976; 2. "Baby, You Look Good to Me Tonight" Released: December 1976

Professional ratings
Review scores
Source	Rating
Allmusic	2/5 stars

Spirit is the eleventh studio album by John Denver. It was released in August, 1976. After the full-blown success of Windsong and its accompanying hit singles, this album began a downward chart trend for the singer, although he continued to have hits on the adult contemporary charts. "Baby, You Look Good to Me Tonight" reached #65 on the U.S. Billboard Hot 100, as well as reaching the Top 40 on the U.S. and Canadian Country and AC charts.

== Background ==
The album was released following the success of its predecessor, Windsong, and was produced by Milt Okun. Rooted in country and folk music, it features John Denver's distinctive lyrical songwriting and vocals.

The album includes both songs written by Denver himself and compositions by other songwriters. "Like a Sad Song" explores loneliness and emotional emptiness, while "The Wings That Fly Us Home" focuses on the bonds between humans and living things, as well as love and spiritual connection. Other tracks include "Baby, You Look Good to Me Tonight", "Pegasus", and "San Antonio Rose".

The recording features Denver's vocals and guitar, accompanied by Steve Weisberg on guitar, John Sommers on guitar and banjo, Dick Kniss on bass, and Hal Blaine on drums. Lee Holdridge's orchestra also contributed to the album, while the Starland Vocal Band provided backing vocals. "Pegasus" features the children's choir from St. Mel's School in Woodland Hills, California.

Spirit reached number 7 on the US Billboard 200 and number 3 on the Top Country Albums chart. Among its tracks, "Like a Sad Song" peaked at number 36 on the Billboard Hot 100, while "Baby, You Look Good to Me Tonight" reached number 65. However, the album's chart performance declined compared with the success of Windsong. In subsequent years, Denver continued to release hit songs on the Adult Contemporary chart.

The album was later reissued on CD with additional bonus tracks.

== Track listing ==
=== Side one ===
1. "Come and Let Me Look in Your Eyes" (John Denver, Joe Henry) - 3:47
2. "Eli's Song" (Jack Williams) - 3:58
3. "Wrangle Mountain Song" (Denver) - 3:10
4. "Hitchhiker" (Denver, Steve Weisberg) - 3:10
5. "In the Grand Way" (John Sommers) - 3:39
6. "Polka Dots and Moonbeams" (Johnny Burke, Jimmy Van Heusen) - 3:08

=== Side two ===
1. "It Makes Me Giggle" (Denver) - 3:16
2. "Baby, You Look Good to Me Tonight" (Bill Danoff) - 2:45
3. "Like a Sad Song" (Denver) - 3:41
4. "San Antonio Rose" (Bob Wills) - 2:40
5. "Pegasus" (Denver, Henry) - 3:20
6. "The Wings That Fly Us Home" (Denver, Henry) - 4:11

=== CD bonus tracks ===
These tracks were originally released in 1970 as Side 2 of the Whose Garden Was This album.

1. "Whose Garden Was This" (Tom Paxton)
2. "The Game Is Over" (Denver, Jean-Pierre Bourtayre, Jean Bouchéty)
3. "Eleanor Rigby" (John Lennon, Paul McCartney)
4. "Old Folks" (Jacques Brel, Gerard Jouannest, Jean Corti, Eric Blau, Mort Shuman)
5. Medley: "Golden Slumbers" (John Lennon, Paul McCartney), "Sweet Sweet Life" (Denver),
  "Tremble If You Must" (Paul Potash)

== Personnel ==
(All songs arranged by John Denver, Dick Kniss, Steve Weisberg, John Sommers and Hal Blaine. Source: Notes on original "Spirit" Album Sleeve 1976 RCA Records, NY)

- John Denver – guitars, vocals
- Steve Weisberg – electric and acoustic guitars, dobro, pedal steel guitar, backing vocals
- Hal Blaine – drums, percussion
- Dick Kniss – bass
- John Sommers – acoustic guitar, banjo, fiddle, backing vocals
- Lee Holdridge – orchestral arrangements, conductor
- Starland Vocal Band - backing vocals
- Children's Choir on "Pegasus" from St. Mel's School, Woodland Hills, California

== Charts ==
Chart (1976)	Peak position
Australia (Kent Music Report)	13
