= Rhymes & Reasons (John Denver album) =

Studio album by John Denver
- Released: October 14, 1969
- Studio: RCA, New York City
- Genre: Folk rock
- Length: 37:28
- Label: RCA Victor
- Producer: Milton Okun

John Denver chronology
| John Denver Sings (1966) | Rhymes & Reasons (1969) | Take Me to Tomorrow (1970) |

Singles from Rhymes & Reasons
- 1. "Daydream" Released: October 1969; 2. "Leaving on a Jet Plane" Released: October 1969

Professional ratings
Review scores
| Source | Rating |
|---|---|
| AllMusic | 3/5 stars |
| The New Rolling Stone Record Guide | 1/5 stars |

Rhymes & Reasons is the first commercial studio album by the American singer-songwriter John Denver, released in October 1969 by RCA Records. It was reissued on CD by Legacy Recordings in 2005.

"Leaving on a Jet Plane" was written and recorded by Denver in 1966 and included on his debut demo recording John Denver Sings as "Babe I Hate to Go". He made several copies and gave them out as presents for Christmas of that year. Denver's then producer Milt Okun convinced him to change the title and it was renamed "Leaving on a Jet Plane" in 1967. After the success of the Peter, Paul and Mary version in 1969, Denver recorded the song again for his debut album, Rhymes & Reasons, and it was released as a single in October 1969. Although it is one of Denver's best known songs, his single failed to enter the charts. It was re-recorded for the third and final time in 1973 for John Denver's Greatest Hits and this version appears on most of his compilation albums.

== Track listing ==
Side one
| No. | Title | Writer(s) | Length |
|---|---|---|---|
| 1. | "The Love of the Common People" | John Hurley; Ronnie Wilkins | 4:06 |
| 2. | "Catch Another Butterfly" | Mike Williams | 2:31 |
| 3. | "Daydream" | John Denver | 2:54 |
| 4. | "The Ballad of Spiro Agnew" | Tom Paxton | 0:15 |
| 5. | "Circus" | Michael Johnson; Denver; Laurie Kuehn | 2:37 |
| 6. | "When I'm Sixty-Four" | John Lennon; Paul McCartney | 2:02 |
| 7. | "The Ballad of Richard Nixon" | Paxton | 0:05 |
| 8. | "Rhymes & Reasons" | Denver | 3:15 |
| Total length: | | | 17:45 |

Side two
| No. | Title | Writer(s) | Length |
|---|---|---|---|
| 1. | "Yellow Cat" | Steven Fromholz | 2:52 |
| 2. | "Leaving on a Jet Plane" | Denver | 3:37 |
| 3. | "(You Dun Stomped) My Heart" | Mason Williams | 2:41 |
| 4. | "My Old Man" | Jerry Jeff Walker | 4:34 |
| 5. | "I Wish I Knew How It Would Feel to Be Free" | Billy Taylor; Dick Dallas | 3:49 |
| 6. | "Today Is the First Day of the Rest of My Life (Sugacity)" | Pat Garvey; Victoria Garvey | 2:10 |
| Total length: | | | 19:43 |

CD edition (bonus tracks)
| No. | Title | Writer(s) | Length |
|---|---|---|---|
| 15. | "Rusty Green" | Denver |
| 16. | "Take Me to Tomorrow" (early version) | Denver |

== Personnel ==
=== Musicians ===
- John Denver – vocals, guitar, arranger
- Stan Free – organ
- Paul Griffin – keyboards
- Herbie Lovelle – drums
- George Marge – baritone saxophone
- Paul Prestopino – guitar, autoharp, mandolin
- Albert Richmond – French horn
- Russ Savakus – bass guitar
- Teddy Sommer – drums
- Marvin Stamm – flute, trumpet
- Eric Weissberg – banjo, steel guitar
- Tommy Goodman - additional instrumentation

=== Production ===
- Jim Crotty – recording engineer
- Milton Okun – producer, arranger
- John Woram – recording engineer
- Jean Goldhirsch - assistant producer

== Charts ==
| Chart (1969–73) | Peak position |
|---|---|
| UK Albums (OCC) | 21 |
| US Billboard 200 | 148 |
