= Dreamland Express =

Studio album by John Denver
- Released: June 1985
- Genre: Country; pop; folk; soft rock
- Length: 44:52
- Label: RCA Victor
- Producer: Roger Nichols

John Denver chronology
| John Denver's Greatest Hits, Volume 3 (1984) | Dreamland Express (1985) | One World (1986) |

Professional ratings
Review scores
| Source | Rating |
|---|---|
| AllMusic | 2/5 stars |

Dreamland Express is the eighteenth studio album by American singer-songwriter John Denver, released in June 1985. The singles from this album were "Dreamland Express" and "Don't Close Your Eyes, Tonight".

== Track listing ==
Side one

1. "Dreamland Express" (Denver)
2. "Claudette" (Roy Orbison)
3. "Gimme Your Love" (Jack Conrad, Frank Musker)
4. "Got My Heart Set on You" (Dobie Gray, Bud Reneau)
5. "If Ever" (Stephanie Andrews, Stevie Wonder)

Side two

1. "The Harder They Fall" (Denver)
2. "Don't Close Your Eyes, Tonight" (Richard Kerr, Frank Musker)
3. "A Wild Heart Looking for Home" (Denver, Joe Henry)
4. "I'm in the Mood to Be Desired" (Andre Martel, Katrina Walker)
5. "Trail of Tears" (Roger Cook, Allen Reynolds, Randy Handley)
6. "African Sunrise" (Denver)

== Personnel ==
- John Denver – vocals, guitar
- Paulinho da Costa – percussion
- Pete Christlieb – saxophone
- Conrad Reeder – background vocals
- Robbie Buchanan – synthesizer
- Roger Nichols – percussion
- Dean Parks – guitar
- Jerry Scheff – bass
- Jerry Carrigan – drums
- Chuck Findley – trumpet
- Sid Sharp – concert master
- Glen D. Hardin – piano, synthesizer
- Gene Morford – background vocals
- Russell Powell - guitar
- Marty Walsh – guitar
- Stevie Wonder – harmonica on "If Ever"
- Jim Haas – background vocals
- Elizabeth Lamers – background vocals
- Jim Horn – saxophone
- Joe Turano – background vocals
- Billy Zoom – guitar feedback
- James Burton – guitar

== Chart performance ==
| Chart (1985) | Peak position |
|---|---|
| Australia (Kent Music Report) | 71 |
| U.S. Billboard Top Country Albums | 64 |
| U.S. Billboard 200 | 90 |
