= Whose Garden Was This =

Studio album by John Denver
- Released: October 1970
- Studio: RCA, New York City
- Genre: Folk
- Length: 36:52
- Label: RCA Victor
- Producer: Milton Okun

John Denver chronology
Take Me to Tomorrow (1970)	Whose Garden Was This (1970)	Poems, Prayers & Promises (1971)

Professional ratings
Review scores
Source	Rating
Allmusic	2/5 stars

Whose Garden Was This is the third studio album by American singer-songwriter John Denver, consisting mainly of cover songs. It was released in October 1970. This album was subsequently re-released as bonus tracks on re-releases of the albums John Denver and Spirit. British singer Dame Vera Lynn recorded the title song in 1972 for her album Unforgettable Songs by Vera Lynn. Actually, Vera Lynn was keen to sing the song on her BBC television show (1972) but felt the song was a little too short and asked Tom Paxton for a further verse to be added - and he duly obliged - with the 'forest/squirrels' one. Subsequently he often sang this later version in concert.

== Track listing ==
Side one
No.	Title	Writer(s)	Length
1.	"Tremble If You Must"	Paul Potash	1:22
2.	"Sail Away Home"	John Denver	4:35
3.	"The Night They Drove Old Dixie Down"	Robbie Robertson	3:54
4.	"Mr. Bojangles"	Jerry Jeff Walker	4:36
5.	"I Wish I Could Have Been There (Woodstock)"	Denver	2:30

Side two
No.	Title	Writer(s)	Length
1.	"Whose Garden Was This"	Tom Paxton	3:44
2.	"The Game Is Over"	Denver; Jean-Pierre Bourtayre; Jean Bouchéty	2:25
3.	"Eleanor Rigby"	John Lennon; Paul McCartney	3:11
4.	"Old Folks"	Jacques Brel; Gérard Jouannest; Jean Corti; Mort Shuman	4:51
5.	"Golden Slumbers"/"Sweet Sweet Life"/"Tremble If You Must (Version II)" (medley)	Lennon; McCartney / Denver / Potash	4:28
6.	"Jingle Bells"	James Pierpont; Denver^{[a]}	1:06

Notes

- ^{^a} signifies adapted by

== Personnel ==
=== Musicians ===
- John Denver – guitar, vocals, arranger
- Paul Griffin – keyboards
- Russ Savakus – bass
- Teddy Sommer – drums
- David Spinozza – guitar
- Mike Taylor – guitar

=== Production ===
- John Crotty – recording engineer
- Jean Goldhirsch – production assistant
- Ray Hall – recording engineer
- Milt Okun – producer, arranger, string arrangements

=== Design ===
- Mark Ahlstrom – liner notes photography
- David Hecht – cover photography
- Joe Stelmach – album design
