= Autograph (album) =

Studio album by John Denver
- Released: February 1980
- Recorded: June 11–12, 1979
- Studios: Wally Heider (Hollywood, California)
- Genres: Country, bluegrass, contemporary folk music
- Label: RCA Victor
- Producer: Milton Okun

John Denver chronology
John Denver and the Muppets: A Christmas Together (1979)	Autograph (1980)	Some Days Are Diamonds (1981)

Singles from Autograph
- 1. "Autograph" Released: February 1980

Professional ratings
Review scores
Source	Rating
AllMusic	3/5 stars

Autograph is the fourteenth studio album by American singer-songwriter John Denver, released in February 1980.

== Track listing ==
All songs written and composed by John Denver, except where noted. 2001 CD bonus tracks were recorded at the same sessions in 1979.

Side one
No.	Title	Writer(s)	Length
1.	"Dancing with the Mountains"		3:55
2.	"The Mountain Song"	Tracey Wickland	4:38
3.	"How Mountain Girls Can Love"	Ruby Rakes	2:13
4.	"Song for the Life"	Rodney Crowell	3:44
5.	"The Ballad of St. Anne's Reel"	David Mallet	3:22
6.	"In My Heart"		3:42

Side two
No.	Title	Writer(s)	Length
7.	"Wrangell Mountain Song"		2:43
8.	"Whalebones and Crosses"	Joe Henry, Lee Holdridge	4:37
9.	"American Child"	Denver, Henry	3:17
10.	"You Say That the Battle Is Over"	Mallet	2:39
11.	"Autograph"		3:36

2001 CD bonus tracks
No.	Title	Writer(s)	Length
12.	"Dance Little Jean"	Jimmy Ibbotson	3:07
13.	"On the Wings of an Eagle"		5:34

== Personnel ==
- John Denver – vocals, 6- and 12-string guitars
- Hal Blaine – drums, percussion
- James Burton – electric and acoustic guitars, dobro
- Emory Gordy Jr. – bass, mandolin
- Glen Hardin – keyboards
- Jim Horn – reeds
- Herb Pedersen – banjo, electric & acoustic guitars
- Russell Powell – bass
- Denny Brooks – acoustic guitar
- Danny Wheetman – mandolin, harmonica
- Renée Armand-Horn, Denny Brooks, Herb Pedersen, Danny Wheetman – backing vocals
- Lee Holdridge – orchestral arrangements

== Production ==
- Producer – Milton Okun
- Recording engineer – Ed Barton
- Assistant engineers – Ralph Osborn, Tchad Blake, Andrew Clark, Andy Todd & Randy Pipes
- Recorded at – Filmways/Heider Studios, Hollywood, California June 11–21, 1979
- A & R coordination – Lynne Morse
- LP cover photo – Edgar Boyles
- LP liner photo – John Denver
- LP lyric sleeve photo – Scott Hensel/Gribbitt!
- LP art direction & design – Tim Bryant/Gribbitt!

== Chart performance ==
Chart (1980)	Peak position
Australia (Kent Music Report)	56
U.S. Billboard Top Country Albums	28
U.S. Billboard 200	39
Canadian RPM Top Albums	72
