= I Want to Live (album) =

Studio album by John Denver
- Released: November 4, 1977
- Length: 39:49
- Label: RCA Victor
- Producer: Milton Okun

John Denver chronology
John Denver's Greatest Hits, Volume 2 (1977)	I Want to Live (1977)	John Denver (1979)

Singles from I Want to Live
- 1. "How Can I Leave You Again?" Released: August 1977; 2. "It Amazes Me" Released: February 1978; 3. "I Want To Live" Released: April 1978

I Want to Live is the twelfth studio album by American singer-songwriter John Denver. released by RCA Records in November 1977. The title song was dedicated to the "Hunger Project", of which Denver was on the board of directors.

== Critical reception ==
Professional ratings
Review scores
Source	Rating
AllMusic	2/5 stars

The lead single was "How Can I Leave You Again", of which Record World said: "It moves slowly but with feeling, and is bound to be a favorite with female audiences of all ages this autumn."

== Track listing ==
All tracks composed by John Denver; except where indicated

=== Side one ===
1. "How Can I Leave You Again" – 3:07
2. "Tradewinds" – 3:17
3. "Bet on the Blues" (Tom Paxton) – 3:50
4. "It Amazes Me" – 2:35
5. "To the Wild Country" – 4:31
6. "Ripplin' Waters" (Jimmy Ibbotson) – 3:56

=== Side two ===
1. "Thirsty Boots" (Eric Andersen) – 4:35
2. "Dearest Esmeralda" (Bill Danoff) – 3:29
3. "Singing Skies and Dancing Waters" – 4:01
4. "I Want to Live" – 3:45
5. "Druthers" – 2:43

== Personnel ==
- John Denver – vocals, guitar
- James Burton – guitar
- Renée Armand – vocals
- Hal Blaine – drums
- Mike Crumm – vocals
- Chuck Domanico – bass
- Michael Lang – keyboards
- Herb Pedersen – vocals, banjo, guitar
- Lee Ritenour – guitar
- Lee Holdridge – orchestral arrangements

Technical

- Kris O'Connor – production assistance
- Mickey Crofford – engineer
- Acy Lehman – art direction
- Mark English – cover illustration

== Charts ==
=== Weekly charts ===
Chart (1977–1978)	Peak position
Australia Albums (Kent Music Report)	16
US Billboard 200	45
US Top Country Albums (Billboard)	10

=== Year-end charts ===
Chart (1978)	Position
US Top Country Albums (Billboard)	40
