= Rocky Mountain High (album) =

Studio album by John Denver
- Released: September 15, 1972
- Studio: RCA, New York City
- Genre: Country folk
- Length: 37:14
- Label: RCA Victor
- Producer: Milton Okun

John Denver chronology
Aerie (1971)	Rocky Mountain High (1972)	Farewell Andromeda (1973)

Singles from Rocky Mountain High
- 1. "Goodbye Again" Released: July 1972; 2. "Hard Life, Hard Times (Prisoners)" Released: September 1972; 3. "Rocky Mountain High" Released: October 30, 1972

Rocky Mountain High is the sixth studio album released by American singer-songwriter John Denver in September 1972. It was his first US Top 10 album (no. 4), propelled by the title single, and in addition reached no. 11 in the UK and no. 1 in Canada. The album's cover photograph was taken at Slaughterhouse Falls, Rio Grande Trail, Aspen, Colorado.

== Background ==
The album marked Denver's commercial breakthrough, becoming his first album to reach the top 10 in the United States. Produced by Milt Okun, it was recorded at RCA Studios in New York City in 1972.

The album was largely inspired by Denver's experiences after relocating to Aspen, Colorado, where he developed a deep appreciation for the region's natural landscape and mountain lifestyle. The title track, "Rocky Mountain High", was written as a reflection of the sense of awe and spiritual connection he experienced in the Rocky Mountains. It became one of his signature songs, and Denver later recalled that it took him approximately nine months to complete.

In addition to Denver's original compositions, the album includes songs by other writers, such as the Beatles' "Mother Nature's Son" and John Prine's "Paradise". The selection has been regarded as reflecting both Denver's respect for the folk music tradition and his musical roots. Regular collaborators, including bassist Dick Kniss and guitarist Mike Taylor, also contributed to the album, helping establish the folk and country sound that would characterize Denver's recordings throughout the following years.

The album concludes with "Season Suite", a multi-part composition depicting the progression of the seasons through sections representing summer, autumn, winter, late winter, early spring, and spring. The suite is regarded as one of the album's most notable pieces, reflecting Denver's enduring fascination with nature and the cycles of the natural world.

== Reception ==
Professional ratings
Review scores
Source	Rating
AllMusic	3.5/5 stars
Creem	C

In July 1972, Record World called the single 'Goodbye Again', "a sad, gentle ballad that threatens to become a standard along the lines of 'Leaving on a Jet Plane.'" In September of that same year, Record World commended the single "Hard Life, Hard Times (Prisoners)" for its "good use of counterpoint towards the end."

William Ruhlmann of AllMusic wrote of Rocky Mountain High that, "Though Denver still couldn't figure out how to fill out an entire album without covering his betters (in this case, old favorites the Beatles and John Prine), he and his steady backup musicians, bassist Dick Kniss and guitarist Mike Taylor, were evolving into an exuberant folk-country sound that would prove enormously appealing over the next few years." Ruhlman highlighted "Goodbye Again" and "For Baby (For Bobbie)", praising the former as "one of Denver's finest ballads."

== Track listing ==
Side one
No.	Title	Writer(s)	Length
1.	"Rocky Mountain High"	John Denver; Mike Taylor	4:43
2.	"Mother Nature's Son"	John Lennon; Paul McCartney	2:28
3.	"Paradise"	John Prine	2:13
4.	"For Baby (For Bobbie)"	Denver	2:57
5.	"Darcy Farrow"	Steve Gillette; Tom Campbell	4:22
6.	"Prisoners"	Denver	3:36

Side two
No.	Title	Writer(s)	Length
1.	"Goodbye Again"	Denver	3:36
2.	"Season Suite: Summer"	Denver; Taylor; Dick Kniss	2:51
3.	"Season Suite: Fall"	Denver; Taylor; Kniss	1:38
4.	"Season Suite: Winter"	Denver; Taylor; Kniss	1:36
5.	"Season Suite: Late Winter, Early Spring (When Everybody Goes to Mexico)"	Denver; Taylor; Kniss	4:00
6.	"Season Suite: Spring"	Denver; Taylor; Kniss	2:27

== Personnel ==
- John Denver – 6-string acoustic guitars, 12-string acoustic guitars, vocals, arrangements
- Mike Taylor – guitar
- Dick Kniss – double bass, arranger
- Frank Owens – piano
- Paul Prestopino – mandolin, dobro
- Eric Weissberg – banjo, steel guitar
- Gary Chester – drums, percussion
- Bill Danoff, Martine Habib, Bruce Innes, Mike Kobluk, Taffy Nivert – backing vocals
- Pupils of Whitby School, Greenwich, Connecticut – backing vocals on "For Baby (For Bobbie)"
