= Take Me to Tomorrow =

Studio album by John Denver
- Released: May 1970
- Studio: RCA, New York City
- Genre: Folk
- Length: 31:30
- Label: RCA Victor
- Producer: Milton Okun

John Denver chronology
Rhymes & Reasons (1969)	Take Me to Tomorrow (1970)	Whose Garden Was This (1970)

Professional ratings
Review scores
Source	Rating
Allmusic	3/5 stars

Take Me to Tomorrow is the second studio album by American singer-songwriter John Denver. It was released in May 1970.

Record World said the single "Follow Me" is "a beauty which will establish [Denver] as a hitmaker." Cash Box called it "a very pretty ballad [...] tenderly delivered by author John Denver."

The album debuted on Billboard magazine's Top LP's chart in the issue dated May 2, 1970, peaking at No. 197 during a two-week run on the chart.

== Critical reception ==
In AllMusic, Greg Adams said: "Take Me to Tomorrow will come as a surprise to anyone expecting the pretty folk music and "listen to the wisdom of the children" lyrics usually associated with John Denver. The album, with its comparatively heavy folk-rock sound married to lyrics that mention belching and latrines, strives for the realism and capital "I" importance of Paul Simon, or even Phil Ochs, without the blatant politics. Denver tackles two Tom Paxton songs, including "Forest Lawn," a wry swipe at the cemetery business that echoes Evelyn Waugh's classic novel The Loved One. Pretty folk isn't entirely absent "Aspenglow" is the cut that is usually included on anthologies. According to the liner notes, Take Me to Tomorrow and Denver's solo debut, Rhymes & Reasons, combine to replicate his concert performance circa 1969, with Rhymes & Reasons comprising the lighter first-half of the show, and Take Me to Tomorrow the more rousing and cerebral second-half. Viewed from that perspective, the album accomplishes its goal, but it is not a typical John Denver album and will not be to every fan's liking."

== Track listing ==
Side one
No.	Title	Writer(s)	Length
1.	"Take Me to Tomorrow"	John Denver	2:53
2.	"Isabel"	Denver	3:16
3.	"Follow Me"	Denver	2:51
4.	"Forest Lawn"	Tom Paxton	2:33
5.	"Aspenglow"	Denver	2:06
6.	"Amsterdam"	Jacques Brel; Mort Shuman; Eric Blau	3:25

Side two
No.	Title	Writer(s)	Length
1.	"Anthem-Revelation"	Denver	2:01
2.	"Sticky Summer Weather"	Denver	3:25
3.	"Carolina in My Mind"	James Taylor	2:37
4.	"Jimmy Newman"	Tom Paxton	2:15
5.	"Molly"	Biff Rose	3:38

== Personnel ==
=== Musicians ===
- John Denver – electric and acoustic guitar, 12-string guitar, vocals, arranger
- Stan Free – organ on "Forest Lawn", piano on "Sticky Summer Weather", accordion on "Jimmy Newman"
- Paul Griffin – piano, organ, celesta
- Herbie Lovelle – drums
- Joe Macho – bass on "Take Me to Tomorrow" and "Anthem-Revelation"
- George Marge – English horn on "Sticky Summer Weather"
- Paul Prestopino – lead guitar on "Take Me to Tomorrow" and "Sticky Summer Weather", dobro on "Forest Lawn", autoharp on "Amsterdam" and "Anthem-Revelation", 12-string guitar on "Aspenglow"
- Russ Savakus – bass
- Denny Seiwell – drums on "Take Me to Tomorrow" and "Anthem-Revelation"
- Marvin Stamm – piccolo trumpet on "Anthem-Revelation"

=== Production ===
- Jim Aylward – liner notes
- Jim Crotty – recording engineer
- Milton Okun – producer, arranger

== Charts ==
Chart (1970)	Peak position
US Billboard Top LPs	197
