= Poems, Prayers & Promises =

1971 album by John Denver

Studio album by John Denver
- Released: April 6, 1971
- Recorded: 1970–1971
- Studios: RCA, New York City
- Genre: Country folk
- Length: 37:57
- Label: RCA Victor
- Producers: Milton Okun; Susan Ruskin

John Denver chronology
Whose Garden Was This (1970)	Poems, Prayers & Promises (1971)	Aerie (1971)

Singles from Poems, Prayers & Promises
- 1. "Take Me Home, Country Roads" Released: April 12, 1971

Professional ratings
Review scores
Source	Rating
AllMusic	3/5 stars
Christgau's Record Guide	C
The Encyclopedia of Popular Music	3/5 stars
MusicHound Rock: The Essential Album Guide	3/5 stars
The New Rolling Stone Record Guide	2/5 stars

Poems, Prayers & Promises is the fourth studio album by American singer-songwriter John Denver, released on April 6, 1971 by RCA Records. The album was recorded in New York City, and produced by Milton Okun and Susan Ruskin. Poems, Prayers & Promises was Denver's commercial breakthrough, and contains several of his most popular songs, such as "Poems, Prayers and Promises", "My Sweet Lady", "I Guess He'd Rather Be in Colorado", "Sunshine on My Shoulders", and "Take Me Home, Country Roads", which would become one of Denver's signature songs. "The Box", which concludes the album, is a poem by Kendrew Lascelles illustrating the futility of war.

The album peaked at number 15 on the Billboard 200.

== Background ==
The album is regarded as a commercial breakthrough in Denver's musical career and features several of his signature songs, including "Take Me Home, Country Roads" and "Sunshine on My Shoulders".

Unlike his earlier albums, on which he primarily recorded songs written by other songwriters, Denver wrote more than half of the songs on Poems, Prayers & Promises himself. The album is centered on acoustic guitar-based, understated arrangements and Denver's vocals, with many of the songs reflecting on nature, love, and life.

The title track, "Poems, Prayers & Promises", was written by Denver and reflects on his life, including thoughts about the passage of time, the future, love, and human relationships. Through the song, Denver expresses a positive outlook on his life while also singing about his regrets over the passage of time and the things he hoped to accomplish in the future.

"Take Me Home, Country Roads" was co-written by Bill Danoff, Taffy Nivert, and Denver. After hearing an unfinished song that Danoff and Nivert had been working on, Denver decided to include it on his album. Although it did not become an immediate hit, it gained popularity as RCA Records continued promoting the single. The song eventually reached No. 2 on the U.S. Billboard Hot 100 and became one of Denver's signature songs.

"Sunshine on My Shoulders" is another signature song from the album, showcasing Denver's interest in nature and his lyrical musical style. John Denver's official website identifies the song, along with "Take Me Home, Country Roads", as one of the notable songs introduced through Poems, Prayers & Promises.

The album also includes interpretations of songs by other musicians alongside Denver's original compositions. These include the Beatles' "Let It Be", Paul McCartney's "Junk", and James Taylor's "Fire and Rain". The closing track, "The Box", is a spoken-word piece without music, written by Kendrew Lasslis. "The Box" depicts the destructive nature of war through the imagery of a box symbolizing war and a ball that emerges from it.

== Track listing ==
Side one
No.	Title	Writer(s)	Length
1.	"Poems, Prayers and Promises"	Denver	4:04
2.	"Let It Be"	Lennon–McCartney	3:38
3.	"My Sweet Lady"	Denver	4:23
4.	"Wooden Indian"	Denver	1:38
5.	"Junk"	Paul McCartney	1:40
6.	"Gospel Changes"	John W. Williams	3:24

Side two
No.	Title	Writer(s)	Length
1.	"Take Me Home, Country Roads"	Bill Danoff; Taffy Nivert; Denver	3:08
2.	"I Guess He'd Rather Be in Colorado"	Bill Danoff; Taffy Nivert	2:07
3.	"Sunshine on My Shoulders"	Denver; Richard Kniss; Mike Taylor	5:12
4.	"Around and Around"	Denver	2:16
5.	"Fire and Rain"	James Taylor	3:44
6.	"The Box"	Kendrew Lascelles	2:44

== Personnel ==
- John Denver – guitars, vocals

=== Musicians ===
- Gary Chester – drums
- Bill Danoff – vocals, guitar
- Dick Kniss – double bass
- Taffy Nivert – vocals
- Frank Owens – piano
- Mike Taylor – acoustic guitar
- Eric Weissberg – banjo, steel guitar

=== Production ===
- Ray Hall – recording engineer
- Jean Kaplow – production assistant
- Milton Okun – producer
- Don Wardell – executive producer

== Charts ==
Chart (1974/75)	Peak position
Australia (Kent Music Report)	41
