= Farewell Andromeda =

Studio album by John Denver
- Released: June 1973
- Recorded: 1973
- Studio: RCA, New York City
- Genre: Country; folk
- Length: 39:07
- Label: RCA Victor
- Producer: Milton Okun

John Denver chronology
Rocky Mountain High (1972)	Farewell Andromeda (1973)	Greatest Hits (1973)

Professional ratings
Review scores
Source	Rating
Allmusic	2/5 stars

Farewell Andromeda is the seventh studio album by American singer-songwriter John Denver, released in June 1973. The LP made Billboard's Top 20, reaching No. 16, with three singles subsequently released: "I'd Rather Be a Cowboy" [#62 POP, #25 AC], "Farewell Andromeda" [#89 POP, No. 20 AC] and "Please, Daddy" [#69 POP, No. 69 C&W].

Record World called the title track a "bright and positive ditty in the same vein as 'Rocky Mountain High.'"

== Background ==
Farewell Andromeda was released as a follow-up to Denver's commercially successful album Rocky Mountain High (1972). At the time, Denver had established himself as one of the leading folk pop artists in the United States, and the album continued his exploration of themes such as nature, humanity, family, and spirituality.

The album's title is believed to have been inspired by a line from the poem A Psalm of Life by Henry Wadsworth Longfellow. The title track, "Farewell Andromeda (Welcome to My Morning)", combines cosmic imagery with spiritual themes, reflecting Denver's expanding songwriting approach, which moved beyond personal experience and nature-focused storytelling toward more philosophical and abstract ideas.

The album was produced in collaboration with producer Milt Okun and features a soft acoustic sound rooted in folk music, country, and pop music. Its songs continue Denver's recurring themes, including reverence for nature, nostalgia for the American West, family values, and spiritual reflection.

The album includes tracks such as "I'd Rather Be a Cowboy", "Please, Daddy", and "Farewell Andromeda (Welcome to My Morning)", all of which were also released as singles. In particular, "I'd Rather Be a Cowboy" reflects romanticized imagery of the American frontier and is often regarded as a strong example of Denver's blend of country and folk influences.

== Track listing ==
Side one
No.	Title	Writer(s)	Length
1.	"I'd Rather Be a Cowboy (Lady's Chains)"	John Denver	4:10
2.	"Berkeley Woman"	Bryan Bowers	3:32
3.	"Please, Daddy (Don't Get Drunk This Christmas)"	Bill Danoff; Taffy Nivert	2:56
4.	"Angels from Montgomery"	John Prine	4:47
5.	"River of Love"	John Sommers	3:35

Side two
No.	Title	Writer(s)	Length
1.	"Rocky Mountain Suite (Cold Nights in Canada)"	Denver	3:01
2.	"Whiskey Basin Blues"	Denver	2:47
3.	"Sweet Misery"	Hoyt Axton	3:36
4.	"Zachary and Jennifer"	Denver	2:00
5.	"We Don't Live Here No More"	Bill Danoff	4:03
6.	"Farewell Andromeda (Welcome to My Morning)"	Denver	4:04

== Personnel ==
- John Denver – guitar, vocals
- Eric Weissberg – banjo, steel guitar
- Jan Camp Garrett – mandolin, vocals
- Victor Garrett – bass, vocals
- Lawrence Gottlieb – steel guitar, vocals
- Lee Holdridge – string arrangements
- Michael Holmes – piano
- Dick Kniss – bass
- Herbie Lovelle – drums
- George Marge – woodwind
- Frank Owens – piano
- Paul Prestopino – guitar, autoharp
- John Sommers – banjo, guitar, mandolin, vocals
- Toots Thielemans – harmonica
- Don Wardell – Executive Producer
- Bryan Bowers – autoharp
- Chip Taylor, Steve Chapin, Bill Danoff, Taffy Danoff, Steve Mandell, Martine Habib, Campden Street Choir – vocals

Technical

- Kris O'Connor – assistant producer
- Acy R. Lehman – art director
- Mark English – cover art
