= Windstar Records =

- Parent company: RCA Records (1976–1986); Independent (1986–present)
- Founded: 1976
- Founder: John Denver
- Distributor: Secretly Canadian
- Genre: Folk
- Country of origin: United States

Windstar Records (originally Windsong Records) is a record label based in Snowmass, Colorado, founded by John Denver in 1976.

The label primarily caters to folk music artists and bands, and has signed acts such as Denver, Starland Vocal Band (and its precursor, Fat City), Maxine Nightingale, Johnny's Dance Band and Nanette Mancini thereof, and Tom Crum. Founded as a subsidiary of RCA Records under the name Windsong Records, Windstar became an independent label in 1986, when RCA and Denver parted.

Denver and RCA were not on good terms towards the end of their partnership due to a change in management at RCA, with its executives no longer interested in Denver's genre of music. Also, after being purchased by General Electric (a company with military contracts) in 1985, RCA decided to part ways with Denver after his song "What Are We Making Weapons For (Let Us Begin)" appeared on his last RCA labelled album One World.
