= John Denver =

American singer and songwriter (1943–1997)

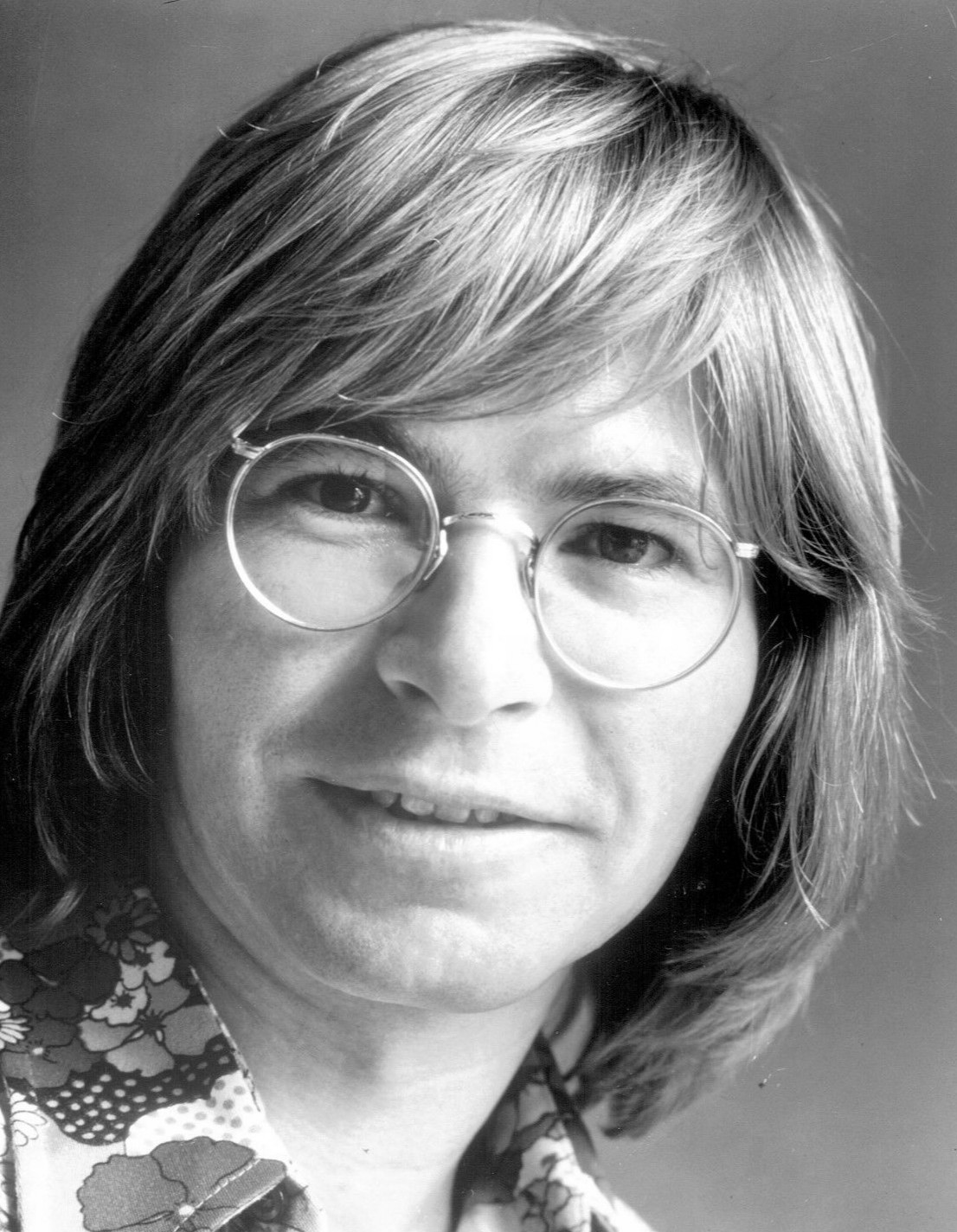
- Denver in 1974
- Born: Henry John Deutschendorf Jr. December 31, 1943; Roswell, New Mexico, U.S.
- Died: October 12, 1997 (aged 53); Monterey Bay near Pacific Grove, California, U.S.
- Cause of death: Aircraft crash
- Occupations: Singer; songwriter; actor
- Years active: 1962–1997
- Spouses: Annie Martell (m. 1967; div. 1982); Cassandra Delaney (m. 1988; div. 1993)
- Children: 3 (Note: One biological child and two adopted children.)
- Musical career
- Genres: Country; folk; Western; country pop; country folk; soft rock
- Instruments: Vocals; guitar
- Labels: Mercury; Reprise; RCA Records; Windstar; Sony Pictures Kids Zone
- Formerly of: The Alpine Trio; The Chad Mitchell Trio
- Website: johndenver.com

Henry John Deutschendorf Jr. (December 31, 1943 – October 12, 1997), known professionally as John Denver, was an American country and folk singer, songwriter, and actor. He was one of the most popular acoustic artists of the 1970s and one of the best-selling artists overall in that decade. AllMusic has called Denver "among the most beloved entertainers of his era".

Denver recorded and released approximately 300 songs, about 200 of which he wrote himself. Denver released 33 albums and singles that were certified gold and platinum in the U.S., with estimated sales of more than 33 million copies. He recorded and performed primarily with an acoustic guitar and sang about his joy in nature, disdain for city life, enthusiasm for music, and relationships. Denver's music appeared on a variety of charts, including country music, the Billboard Hot 100, and adult contemporary, earning 12 gold and four platinum albums with his signature songs "Take Me Home, Country Roads"; "Poems, Prayers & Promises"; "Annie's Song"; "Rocky Mountain High"; "Calypso"; "Thank God I'm a Country Boy"; and "Sunshine on My Shoulders".

Denver appeared in several films and television specials during the 1970s and 1980s. He hosted the pilot episode of the late-night TV series The Midnight Special, which aired on August 19, 1972. Denver starred in the 1977 movie Oh, God! alongside George Burns. He continued to record into the 1990s, also focusing on environmental issues as well as lending vocal support to space exploration and testifying in front of Congress to protest censorship in music. Known for his love of Colorado, Denver lived in Aspen for much of his life. In 1974, Denver was named poet laureate of the state. The Colorado state legislature also adopted "Rocky Mountain High" as one of its two state songs in 2007, and West Virginia did the same for "Take Me Home, Country Roads" in 2014. An avid pilot, Denver died at age 53 in 1997, in a single-fatality crash while piloting a recently purchased light plane.

== Early life ==
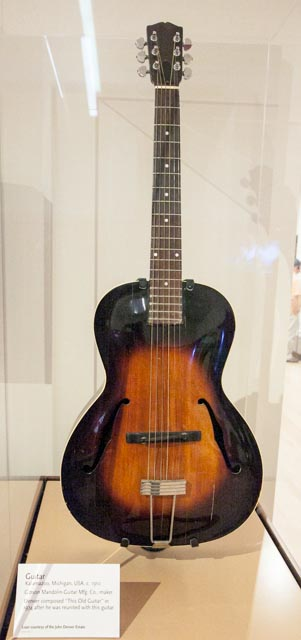
Denver's first guitar

Denver was born Henry John Deutschendorf Jr. on December 31, 1943, in Roswell, New Mexico, to Erma Louise (née Swope; 1922–2010) and Captain Henry John "Dutch" Deutschendorf Sr. (1920–1982), a United States Army Air Forces pilot stationed at Roswell Army Air Field. Captain Deutschendorf Sr. was a decorated pilot who set a number of air speed records in a Convair B-58 Hustler in 1961.

In his 1994 autobiography Take Me Home, Denver described his father as a stern man who could not show his love for his children. With a military father, Denver's family moved often, and he found difficulty making friends and assimilating with his peers. The introverted Denver often felt out of place and did not know where he truly belonged. While stationed at Davis–Monthan Air Force Base in Tucson, Arizona, the Deutschendorfs purchased a house and lived there from 1951 to 1959, when Denver was ages six to 14.

During these years, Denver attended Mansfield Junior High School and was a member of the Tucson Arizona Boys Chorus for two years. He was content in Tucson, but his father was transferred to Maxwell Air Force Base in Montgomery, Alabama. The family later moved to Carswell Air Force Base in Fort Worth, Texas, where Denver graduated from Arlington Heights High School. Denver was distressed with life in Fort Worth and, during his junior year of high school, drove his father's car to California to visit family friends and begin his music career. His father flew to California in a friend's jet to retrieve him, and Denver reluctantly returned to Texas to complete his schooling.

== Career ==
=== Early career ===
At age 11, Denver received an acoustic guitar from his grandmother. He learned to play well enough to perform at local clubs by the time he was in college. Denver decided to change his name when Randy Sparks, founder of the New Christy Minstrels, suggested that "Deutschendorf" would not fit comfortably on a marquee. Denver attended Texas Tech University in Lubbock and sang in a folk-music group, "The Alpine Trio", while studying architecture. He was also a member of the Delta Tau Delta fraternity. Denver dropped out of Texas Tech in 1963 and moved to Los Angeles, where he sang in folk clubs. In 1965, Denver joined The Chad Mitchell Trio, replacing founder Chad Mitchell. After more personnel changes, the trio later became known as "Denver, Boise, and Johnson" (John Denver, David Boise, and Michael Johnson), with whom Denver appeared at the Philadelphia Folk Festival in 1968, then alone in 1969 and 1970.

In 1969, Denver abandoned band life to pursue a solo career and released his first album for RCA Records, Rhymes & Reasons. Two years earlier, he had made a self-produced demo recording of some of the songs he played at his concerts. It included a song Denver had written called "Babe, I Hate to Go", later renamed "Leaving on a Jet Plane". He made several copies and gave them out as Christmas presents. Milt Okun, who produced records for The Chad Mitchell Trio and folk group Peter, Paul and Mary, had become Denver's producer as well. Okun brought the unreleased "Jet Plane" song to Peter, Paul and Mary. Their rendition hit number one on the Billboard Hot 100. Denver's song also made it to number 2 in the UK in February 1970, having also made number 1 on the US Cash Box chart and number 1 in Canada in December 1969.

RCA did not actively promote Rhymes & Reasons with a series of live appearances, but Denver embarked on an impromptu supporting tour throughout the Midwest, stopping at towns and cities, offering to play free concerts at local venues. When he was successful in persuading a school, college, American Legion hall, or coffeehouse to let him perform, Denver distributed posters in the town and usually showed up at the local radio station, guitar in hand, offering himself for an interview. As the writer of "Leaving on a Jet Plane", Denver was often successful in gaining some promotional airtime, usually performing one or two songs live. Some venues let him play for the 'door'; others restricted him to selling copies of the album at intermission and after the show. After several months of this, Denver had built a solid fan base, many of whom remained loyal throughout his career.

Denver recorded two more albums in 1970, Take Me to Tomorrow and Whose Garden Was This, including a mix of songs he had written and covers of other writers' compositions.

=== Career peak ===
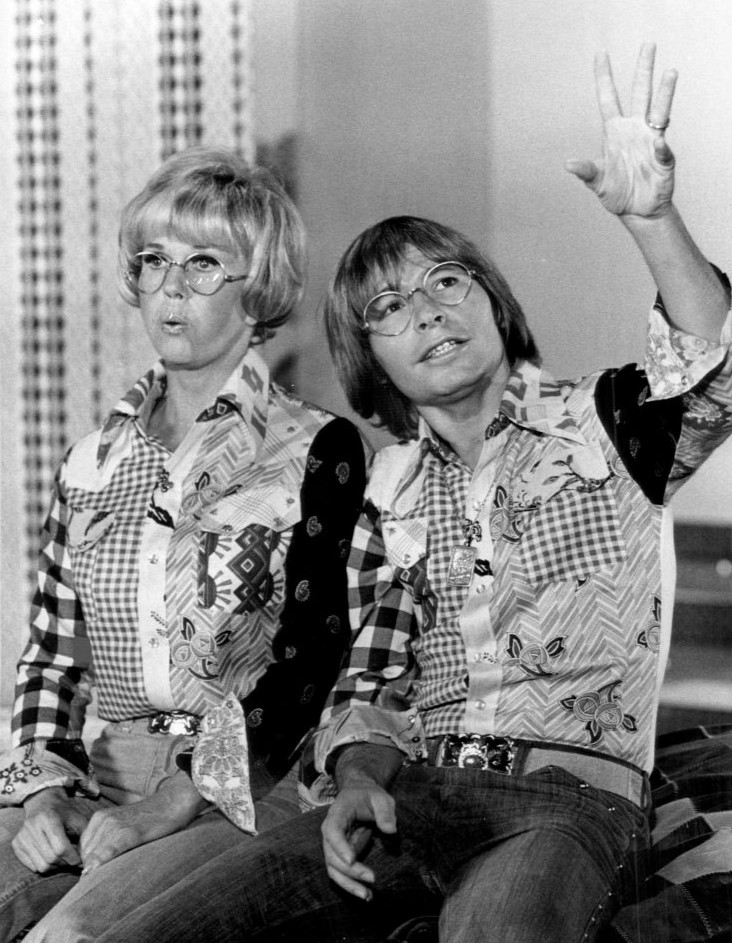
Denver with Doris Day in 1975

Denver's next album, Poems, Prayers & Promises (1971), was a breakthrough for him in the United States, thanks in part to the single "Take Me Home, Country Roads", which went to number 2 on the Billboard charts despite the first pressings of the track being distorted. Its success was due in part to the efforts of his new manager, future Hollywood producer Jerry Weintraub, who signed Denver in 1970. Weintraub insisted on a reissue of the track and began a radio airplay campaign that started in Denver, Colorado. Denver's career flourished thereafter, and he had a series of hits over the next four years. In 1972, Denver had his first Top Ten album with Rocky Mountain High, with its title track reaching the Top Ten in 1973. In 1974 and 1975, Denver had a string of four number 1 songs ("Sunshine on My Shoulders", "Annie's Song", "Thank God I'm a Country Boy", and "I'm Sorry") and three number 1 albums (John Denver's Greatest Hits, Back Home Again, and Windsong).

In the 1970s, Denver's onstage appearance included long blond hair and wire-rimmed "granny" glasses. His embroidered shirts with images commonly associated with the American West were created by the designer and appliqué artist Anna Zapp. Zapp was also responsible for the denim shirt featured on RCA Album release I Want To Live. Weintraub insisted on a significant number of television appearances, including a series of half-hour shows in the United Kingdom, despite Denver's protests at the time, "I've had no success in Britain ... I mean none". In December 1976, Weintraub told Maureen Orth of Newsweek: "I knew the critics would never go for John. I had to get him to the people."

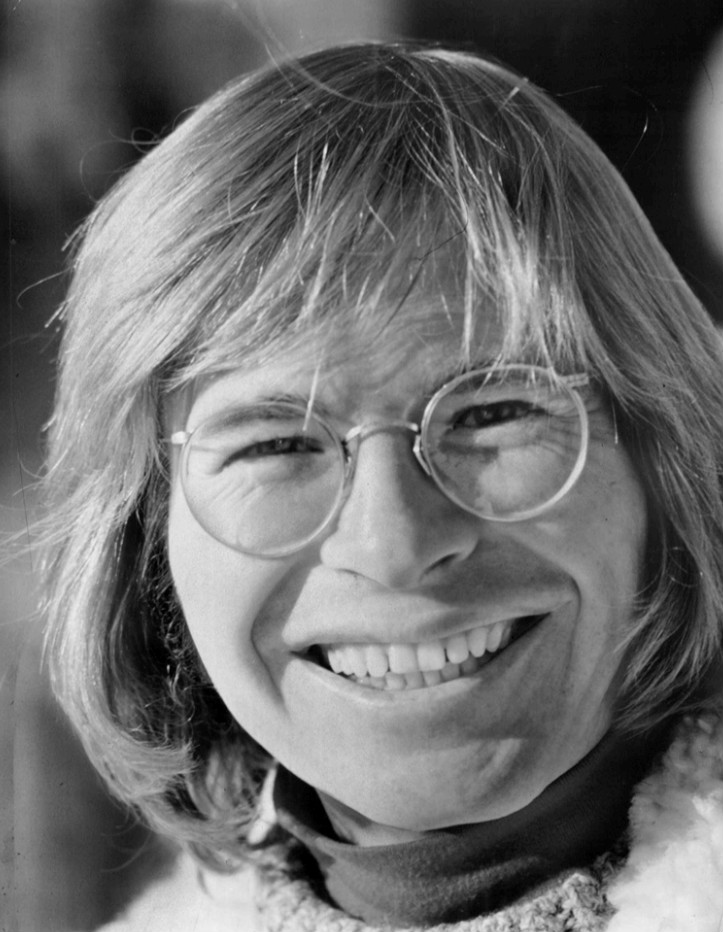
Denver in 1973

After appearing as a guest on many shows, Denver hosted his own variety and music specials, including several concerts from Red Rocks Amphitheatre. His seasonal special Rocky Mountain Christmas was watched by more than 60 million people and was the highest-rated show for the ABC network at that time. In 1973, Denver starred in his own BBC television series, The John Denver Show, a weekly music and variety show directed and produced by Stanley Dorfman.

Denver's live concert special An Evening with John Denver won the 1974–1975 Emmy Award for Outstanding Special, Comedy-Variety or Music. When Denver ended his business relationship in 1982 because of Weintraub's focus on other projects, Weintraub threw Denver out of his office and accused him of Nazism. Denver later told Arthur Tobier when the latter edited his autobiography, "I'd bend my principles to support something he wanted of me. And of course, every time you bend your principles—whether because you don't want to worry about it, or because you're afraid to stand up for fear of what you might lose—you sell your soul to the devil."

Denver was also a guest star on two episodes of The Muppet Show, the beginning of the lifelong friendship between Denver and Jim Henson that spawned two television specials with the Muppets, A Christmas Together and Rocky Mountain Holiday. He also tried acting, appearing in "The Camerons are a Special Clan" episode of the Owen Marshall, Counselor at Law television series in October 1973 and "The Colorado Cattle Caper" episode of the McCloud television series in February 1974. In 1977, Denver starred in the hit comedy film Oh, God! opposite George Burns. He also hosted the Grammy Awards five times in the 1970s and 1980s and guest-hosted The Tonight Show on several occasions.

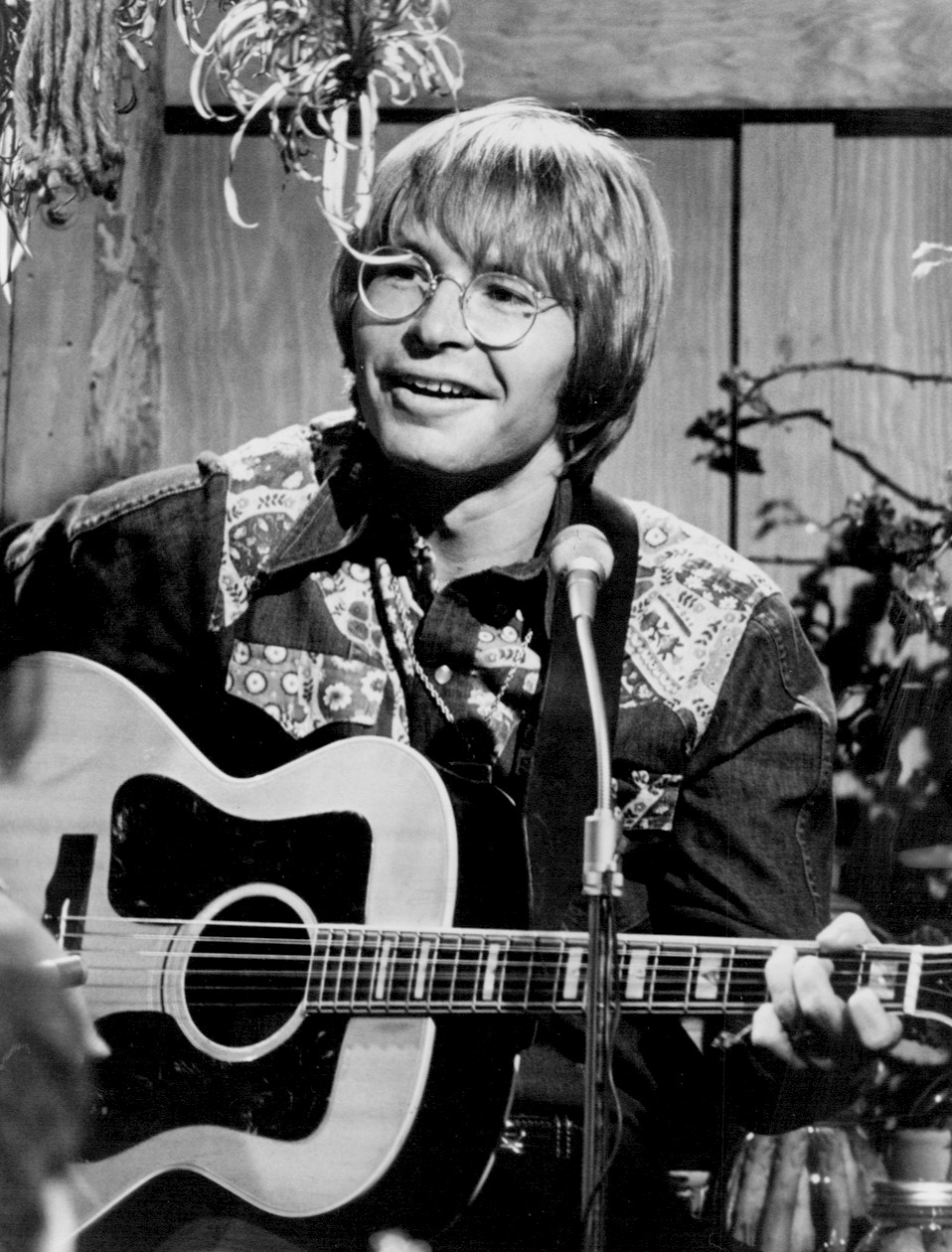
Denver's live concert television special An Evening With John Denver (1975)

In 1975, Denver was awarded the Country Music Association's Entertainer of the Year award. At the ceremony, outgoing Entertainer of the Year Charlie Rich presented the award to his successor after he set fire to the slip of paper containing the official notification of the award. Some speculated Rich was protesting the selection of a non-traditional country artist for the award, but Rich's son disputes that, saying his father was drunk, taking pain medication for a broken foot and just trying to be funny.

In 1977, Denver co-founded The Hunger Project with Werner Erhard and Robert W. Fuller. He served for many years and supported the organization until his death. President Jimmy Carter appointed Denver to serve on the President's Commission on World Hunger. Denver wrote the song "I Want to Live" as the commission's theme song. In 1979, Denver performed "Rhymes & Reasons" at the Music for UNICEF Concert. Royalties from the concert performances were donated to UNICEF.

Denver and his father made up in the mid-1970s, in part because his father taught him how to fly a plane. In 1980, they co-hosted an award-winning television special, The Higher We Fly: The History of Flight.

== Political views and activism ==
In the mid-1970s, Denver became outspoken in politics. He expressed his ecological interests in the 1975 song "Calypso", an ode to the eponymous exploration ship RV Calypso used by Jacques Cousteau. Denver was a supporter of the Democratic Party and of a number of charitable causes for the environmental movement, the homeless, the poor, the hungry, and the African AIDS crisis. He founded the charitable Windstar Foundation in 1976 to promote sustainable living. Denver's dismay at the Chernobyl disaster led to precedent-setting concerts in parts of communist Asia and Europe.

During the 1980s, Denver was critical of Ronald Reagan's administration and remained active in his campaign against hunger, for which Reagan awarded Denver the Presidential World Without Hunger Award in 1987. Denver's criticism of the conservative politics of the 1980s was expressed in his autobiographical folk-rock ballad "Let Us Begin (What Are We Making Weapons For?)". In an open letter to the media, Denver wrote that he opposed oil drilling in the Arctic National Wildlife Refuge. Denver had battled to expand the refuge in the 1980s, and he praised President Bill Clinton for his opposition to the proposed drilling. The letter, which Denver wrote in the midst of the 1996 United States presidential election, was one of the last he ever wrote. In 1992, Denver and fellow singers Liza Minnelli and John Oates performed a benefit to fight the passage of Colorado Amendment 2, a ballot measure approved by voters that prevented Colorado municipalities from enacting anti-discrimination protections for gay people. Denver was also on the National Space Society's board of governors for many years.

== Later years and humanitarian efforts ==
Denver's releases in the late 1970s did not match his earlier success. Denver's songwriting had begun to focus more on humanitarian and sustainability causes than on the romantic themes of his earlier writing. Denver's keen interest in solutions to world hunger led him to visit Africa during the 1980s and to witness firsthand the suffering caused by starvation.

From 1973 to 1979, Denver performed annually at the fundraising picnic for the Aspen Camp School for the Deaf, raising half of the camp's annual operating budget. During the Aspen Valley Hospital's $1.7 million capital campaign in 1979, he was the largest single donor.

In 1983 and 1984, Denver hosted the annual Grammy Awards, as he had previously done in 1977, 1978, and 1979. In the 1983 finale, Denver was joined on stage by folk music legend Joan Baez, with whom Denver led group rendition of "Blowin' in the Wind" and "Let the Sunshine In", joined by several other prominent performers such as Jennifer Warnes, Donna Summer, and Rick James.

In 1984, ABC Sports president Roone Arledge asked Denver to compose and sing the theme song for the 1984 Winter Olympics in Sarajevo. Denver complied by writing and singing "The Gold and Beyond". The following year, Denver asked to participate in the singing of "We Are the World" but was rejected despite his previous commitment to charity work. According to producer Ken Kragen, Denver was overlooked because some industry professionals felt his image would hurt the credibility of the song as a pop-rock anthem. "I didn't agree with this assessment," Kragen said, but he reluctantly turned Denver down anyway. Denver later wrote in his 1994 autobiography "Take Me Home" that the rejection "...broke my heart not to be included."

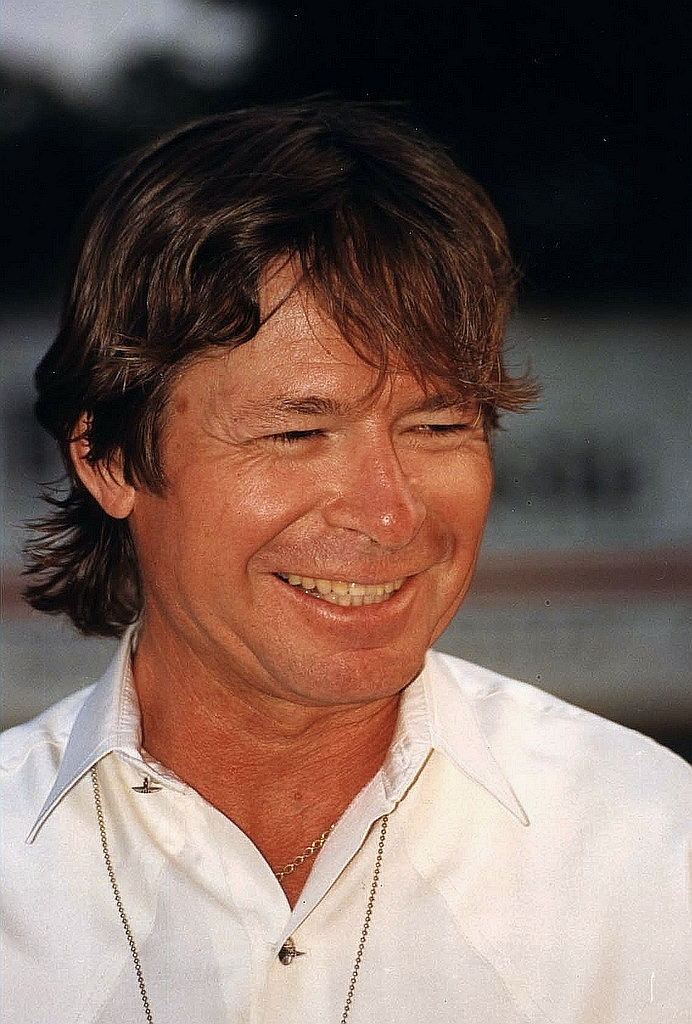
Denver at the 1995 National Memorial Day Concert

Nonetheless, for Earth Day 1990, Denver was the on-camera narrator of the television program In Partnership With Earth with then-EPA Administrator William K. Reilly.

Denver's love of flying attracted him to NASA, and Denver became dedicated to the United States' work in outer space. He worked to help bring into being the "Citizens in Space" program, and received the NASA Exceptional Public Service Medal in 1985 for "helping to increase awareness of space exploration by the peoples of the world." That same year, Denver passed NASA's physical exam and was a finalist for the first citizen's trip on the Space Shuttle in 1986. After the Space Shuttle Challenger disaster with teacher Christa McAuliffe aboard, Denver dedicated his song "Flying for Me" to all astronauts and continued to support NASA. He entered discussions with the Soviet space program about purchasing a flight aboard one of their rockets, but the talks fell through after the price tag was rumored to be as high as $20 million.

Denver testified before the Senate Labor and Commerce Committee on the topic of censorship during a Parents Music Resource Center hearing in 1985. He openly stood with controversial witnesses like Dee Snider of the heavy metal band Twisted Sister and Frank Zappa in opposing the PMRC's objectives.

Denver also toured Russia in 1985. His 11 concerts in the USSR were the first by any American artist in more than a decade. Denver returned two years later to perform at a benefit concert for the victims of the Chernobyl disaster.

In October 1992, Denver undertook a multiple-city tour of the People's Republic of China. He also released a greatest-hits CD named Homegrown to raise money for homeless charities. In 1994, Denver published his autobiography Take Me Home, in which he candidly spoke of his drug use, marital infidelities, and history of domestic violence.

In 1997, Denver filmed an episode for the television series Nature centering on the natural wonders that inspired many of his best-loved songs. His last song, "Yellowstone, Coming Home", composed while rafting along the Colorado River with his son and young daughter, is included. During the summer of 1997, shortly before his death, Denver recorded a children's train album for Sony Pictures Kids Zone, All Aboard!, produced by longtime friend Roger Nichols. The album consisted of old-fashioned swing, big band, folk, bluegrass, and gospel music woven into a theme of railroad songs. It won a posthumous Best Musical Album for Children Grammy, Denver's only Grammy.

In 1996, Denver was inducted into the Songwriters Hall of Fame. His final concert was held in Corpus Christi, Texas, at the Selena Auditorium on October 5, 1997.

== Personal life ==
Denver's first marriage, in 1967, was to Annie Martell of St. Peter, Minnesota. She was the subject of his song "Annie's Song", which he composed in 10 minutes as he sat on a Colorado ski lift. They lived in Edina, Minnesota, from 1968 to 1971. After the success of "Rocky Mountain High", inspired by a camping trip with Annie and some friends, Denver bought a residence in Aspen, Colorado. He lived in Aspen until his death.

The Denvers adopted two young children, who Denver said were "meant to be" theirs. Denver once said, "I'll tell you the best thing about me. I'm some guy's dad; I'm some little gal's dad. When I die, Zachary John and Anna Kate's father, boy, that's enough for me to be remembered by. That's more than enough." His adopted son, Zachary, was the subject of "A Baby Just Like You", a song that included the line "Merry Christmas, little Zachary" which he wrote for Frank Sinatra.

Denver and Martell divorced in 1982. In a 1983 interview shown in the documentary John Denver: Country Boy (2013), Denver said that career demands drove them apart. Martell said they were too young and immature to deal with Denver's sudden success. To drive home the point that their assets were being split in the divorce, he cut their marital bed in half with a chainsaw.

In 1988, Denver married Australian actress Cassandra Delaney after a two-year courtship. Settling at Denver's home in Aspen, they had a daughter. Denver and Delaney separated in 1991 and divorced two years later. Of his second marriage, Denver said that "before our short-lived marriage ended in divorce, she managed to make a fool of me from one end of the valley to the other."

=== Driving under the influence charges ===
In 1993, Denver pleaded guilty to a drunken driving charge and was placed on probation. In August 1994, while still on probation, he was again charged with misdemeanor driving under the influence after crashing his Porsche into a tree in Aspen.

In October 1995, following Denver's drunk-driving conviction, the Federal Aviation Administration (FAA) directed Denver to abstain from alcohol if he wished to continue flying airplanes. In 1996, the FAA determined that Denver was medically disqualified from operating an aircraft due to his failure to abstain from alcohol.

Although a July 1997 trial resulted in a hung jury on the second DUI charge, prosecutors later decided to reopen the case, which was closed only after Denver died in October 1997.

=== Other interests ===
Outside of music, Denver also pursued photography. An exhibition of over 40 never-before-seen photographs taken by Denver debuted at the Leon Gallery in Denver, Colorado, in 2014. Denver also enjoyed aviation and golf. In 1974, Denver bought a Learjet to fly himself to concerts. He was a collector of vintage biplanes and owned a Christen Eagle aerobatic plane, two Cessna 210 Centurion airplanes, and a 1997 amateur-built Rutan Long-EZ.

On April 21, 1989, Denver was in a plane accident while taxiing down the runway at Holbrook Municipal Airport near Holbrook, Arizona, in his vintage 1931 biplane. Denver had stopped to refuel on a flight from Carefree, Arizona, to Santa Fe, New Mexico. Reports stated wind gusts caught the plane, causing it to spin around and sustain extensive damage. Denver was not harmed in the incident.

== Death ==
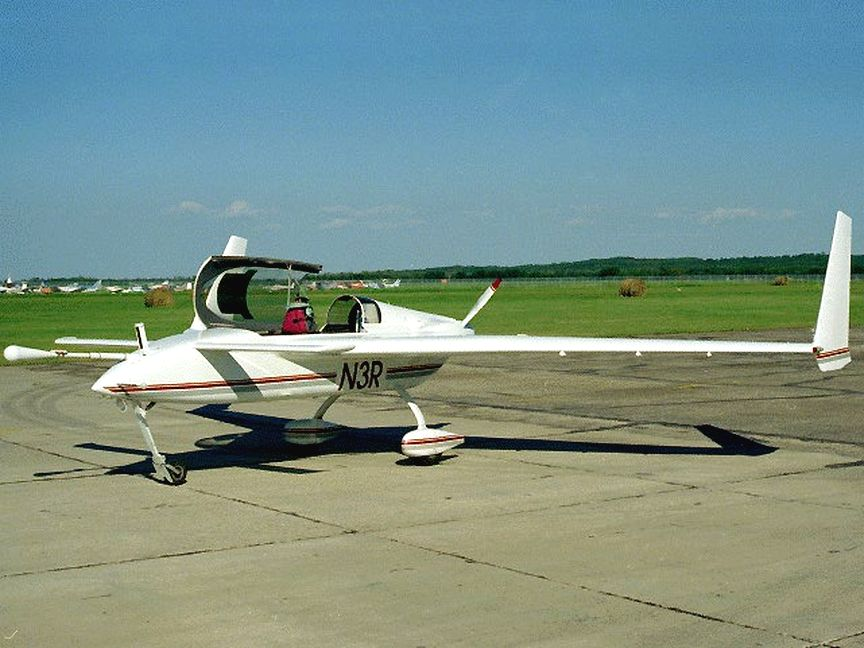
A Long-EZ two-seater canard plane

Denver died on the afternoon of October 12, 1997, when his light homebuilt aircraft, a Rutan Long-EZ with registration number N555JD, crashed into Monterey Bay near Pacific Grove, California, while making a series of touch-and-go landings at the nearby Monterey Peninsula Airport. Denver was the plane's only occupant. The official cause of death was multiple blunt force trauma resulting from the crash.

Denver was a pilot with more than 2,700 hours of experience. He had pilot ratings for single-engine land and sea, multi-engine land, glider and instrument. Denver also held a type rating in his Learjet. He had recently purchased the Long-EZ aircraft, made by someone else from a kit, and had taken a half-hour checkout flight with the aircraft the day before the crash.

Denver was not legally permitted to fly at the time of the crash because of his previous arrests for driving under the influence of alcohol. In 1996, nearly a year before the crash, the FAA learned that Denver had failed to maintain sobriety by not refraining entirely from alcohol and revoked his medical certification. However, it was determined that the crash was not caused or influenced by alcohol use; an autopsy found no signs of alcohol or other drugs in Denver's body.

The post-crash investigation by the National Transportation Safety Board (NTSB) showed that the leading cause of the crash was Denver's inability to switch fuel tanks during flight. The quantity of fuel had been depleted during the plane's flight to Monterey and in several brief practice takeoffs and landings Denver performed at the airport immediately before the final flight. His newly purchased amateur-built Rutan aircraft had an unusual fuel tank selector valve handle configuration. The handle had originally been intended by the plane's designer to be between the pilot's legs. The builder instead put it behind the pilot's left shoulder. The fuel gauge was also placed behind the pilot's seat and was not visible to the person at the controls. An NTSB interview with the aircraft mechanic servicing Denver's plane revealed that he and Denver had discussed the inaccessibility of the cockpit fuel selector valve handle and its resistance to being turned.

Before the flight, Denver and the mechanic had attempted to extend the reach of the handle using a pair of Vise-Grip pliers, but this did not solve the problem, and the pilot still could not reach the handle while strapped into his seat. NTSB officials' post-crash investigation showed that because of the fuel selector valve's positioning, switching fuel tanks required the pilot to turn his body 90 degrees to reach the valve. This created a natural tendency to extend one's right foot against the right rudder pedal to support oneself while turning in the seat, which caused the aircraft to yaw nose right and pitch up.

The mechanic said that he told Denver that the fuel sight gauges were visible only to the rear cockpit occupant. Denver had asked how much fuel was shown. The mechanic responded that there was "less than half in the right tank and less than a quarter in the left tank." He then provided Denver with an inspection mirror so as the pilot he could look over his shoulder at the fuel gauges. The mirror was later recovered from the wreckage. Denver said that he would use the autopilot in flight to hold the airplane level while he turned the fuel selector valve. Denver had turned down an offer to refuel the aircraft, saying that he would only be flying for about an hour.

The NTSB interviewed 20 witnesses about Denver's last flight. Six of them had seen the plane crash into the bay near Point Pinos. Four said the aircraft was originally heading west. Five said that they saw the plane in a steep bank, with four saying that the bank was to the right (north). Twelve described seeing the aircraft in a steep nose-down descent. Witnesses estimated the plane's altitude between 350 and 500 feet (110 and 150 m) when heading toward the shoreline. Eight said they heard a "pop" or "backfire" accompanied by a reduction in the engine noise level just before the plane crashed into the sea.

In addition to Denver's failing to refuel and his subsequent loss of control while attempting to switch fuel tanks, the NTSB determined other key factors that led to the crash. Foremost among these was his inadequate transition training on this type of aircraft and the builder's decision to put the fuel selector handle in a hard-to-reach place. The board issued recommendations on the requirement and enforcement of mandatory training standards for pilots operating home-built aircraft. It also emphasized the importance of mandatory ease of access to all controls, including fuel selectors and fuel gauges, in all aircraft.

== Legacy ==
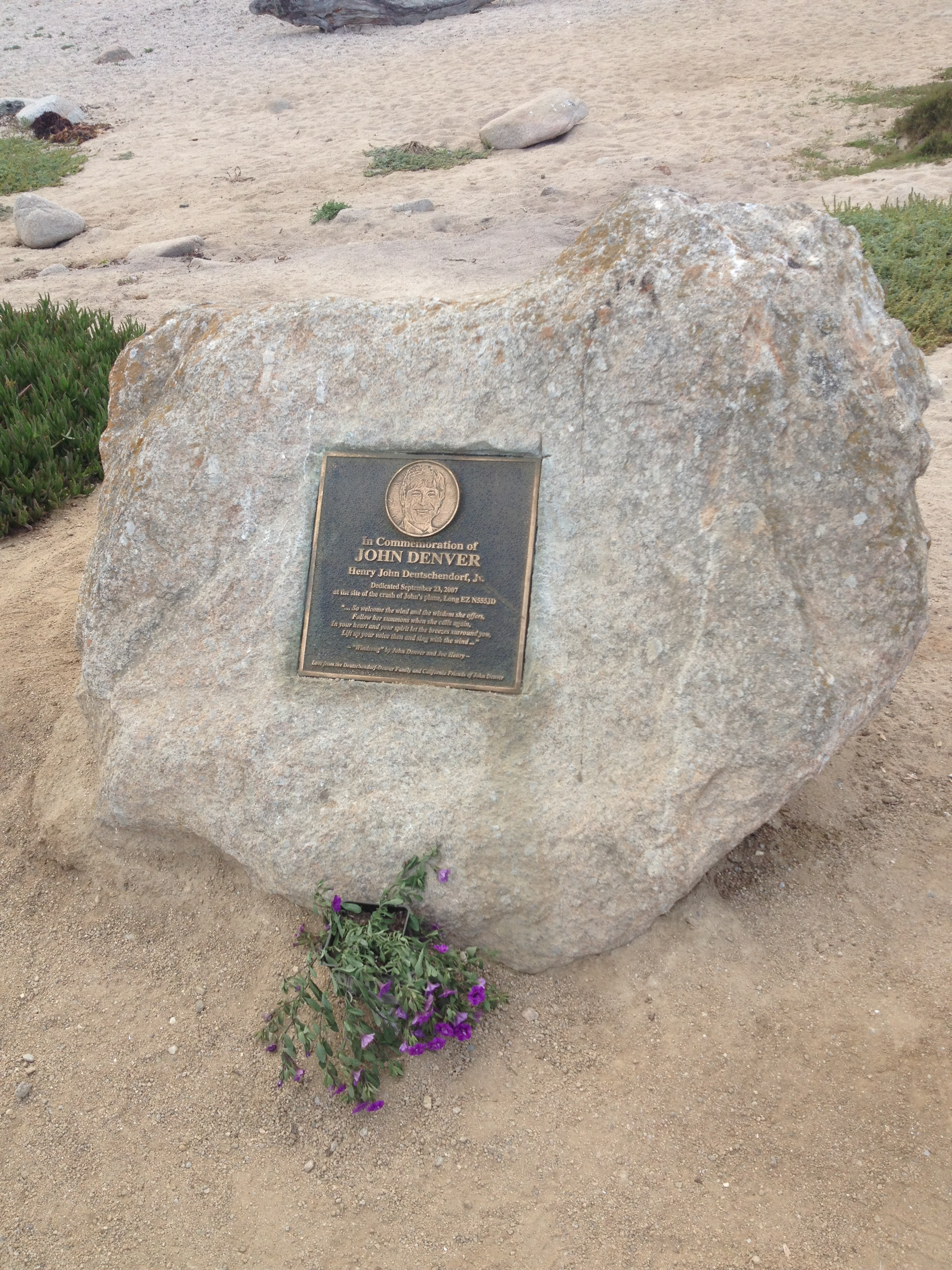
The plaque marking the location of Denver's plane crash in Pacific Grove, California

Upon the announcement of Denver's death, Colorado Governor Roy Romer ordered all state flags to be lowered to half-staff in his honor. Funeral services were held at Faith Presbyterian Church in Aurora, Colorado, on October 17, 1997, officiated by Pastor Les Felker, a retired Air Force chaplain, after which Denver's remains were cremated and his ashes scattered in the Rocky Mountains. Further tributes were made at the following Grammy and Country Music Association Awards.

In 1998, Denver posthumously received the Lifetime Achievement Award from the World Folk Music Association, which also established a new award in his honor, the John Denver Memorial Award, in 1999.

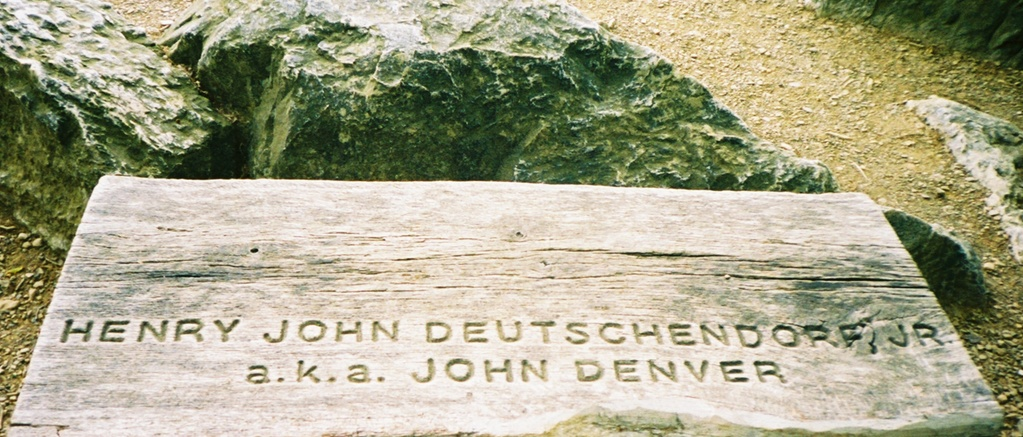
The John Denver Bench at Hawk Mountain Sanctuary in Kempton, Pennsylvania

In 2000, CBS aired the television biopic Take Me Home: The John Denver Story loosely based on his memoirs, starring Chad Lowe as Denver. The New York Post wrote, "An overachiever like John Denver couldn't have been this boring." That year, on April 22, Hawk Mountain Sanctuary in Kempton, Pennsylvania, dedicated a bench that was funded by donations as a tribute to his memory for that year's Earth Day. The bench sits on the South Lookout of the sanctuary.

Copies of DVDs of Denver's many television appearances are now sought-after collectibles, especially his one-hour specials from the 1970s and his six-part series for Britain's BBC, The John Denver Show. An anthology musical featuring Denver's music, Back Home Again: A John Denver Holiday, premiered at the Rubicon Theatre Company in 2006.

On March 12, 2007, the Colorado Senate passed a resolution to make Denver's trademark 1972 hit "Rocky Mountain High" one of the state's two official state songs, sharing the honor with its predecessor, "Where the Columbines Grow". The resolution passed 50–11 in the House, defeating an objection by Representative Debbie Stafford that the song reflected drug use, most specifically in the line "friends around the campfire and everybody's high." Senator Bob Hagedorn, who sponsored the proposal, defended the song as having nothing to do with drugs but rather everything to do with sharing with friends the euphoria of experiencing the beauty of Colorado's mountain vistas. Senator Nancy Todd said, "John Denver to me is an icon of what Colorado is."

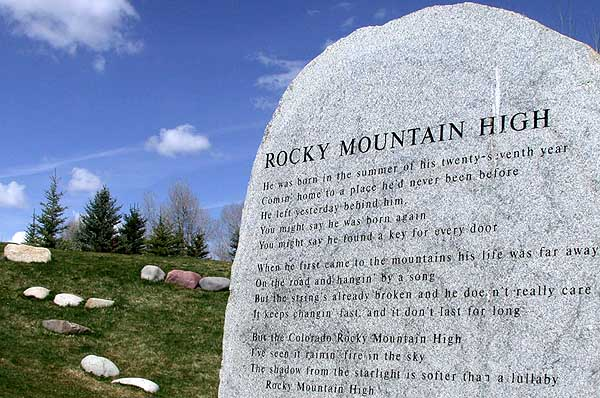
John Denver Memorial stone with the lyrics to "Rocky Mountain High" in Rio Grande Park, Aspen, Colorado

On September 23, 2007, the California Friends of John Denver and The Windstar Foundation unveiled a bronze plaque near the spot where his plane crashed. The site had been marked by a driftwood log carved by Jeffrey Pine with Denver's name, but fears that the memorial could be washed out to sea sparked the campaign for a more permanent memorial. Initially, the Pacific Grove Council denied permission for the memorial, fearing the place would attract ghoulish curiosity from extreme fans. Permission was finally granted in 1999, but the project was put on hold at the request of Denver's family. Eventually, over 100 friends and family, including Denver's brother Ron, attended the dedication of the plaque, which features a bas-relief of the singer's face and lines from his song "Windsong": "So welcome the wind and the wisdom she offers. Follow her summons when she calls again."

To mark the 10th anniversary of his death, Denver's family released a set of previously unreleased recordings of his 1985 concert performances in the Soviet Union. This two-CD set, John Denver – Live in the USSR, was produced by Roger Nichols and released by AAO Music. These digital recordings were made during eleven concerts and then rediscovered in 2002. Included in this set is a previously unreleased rendition of "Annie's Song" in Russian. The collection was released to the general public on November 6, 2007.

On October 13, 2009, a DVD box set of previously unreleased concert recordings from Denver's career was released by Eagle Rock Entertainment. Around the World Live is a 5-disc DVD set featuring three complete live performances with a full band from Australia in 1977, Japan in 1981, and England in 1986. These are complemented by a solo acoustic performance from Japan in 1984 and performances at Farm Aid from 1985, 1987, and 1990. The final disc has two-hour-long documentaries made by Denver.

On April 21, 2011, Denver became the first inductee into the Colorado Music Hall of Fame. A benefit concert was held at Broomfield's 1stBank Center and hosted by Olivia Newton-John. Other performers participating in the event included the Nitty Gritty Dirt Band, Lee Ann Womack, and John Oates. Both his ex-wives attended, and the award was presented to his three children.

The John Denver Spirit sculpture is a 2002 bronze sculpture statue by artist Sue DiCicco that was financed by Denver's fans. It is at the Colorado Music Hall of Fame at Red Rocks Amphitheatre.

On March 7, 2014, the West Virginia Legislature approved a resolution to make "Take Me Home, Country Roads" the official state song. Governor Earl Ray Tomblin signed the resolution into law on March 8. Denver is only the second person, along with Stephen Foster, to have written two state songs.

On October 24, 2014, Denver was awarded a star on the Hollywood Walk of Fame in Los Angeles, California.

== Related artists ==
Denver began his recording career with The Mitchell Trio as a replacement for Chad Mitchell; he sings the lead on "Violets of Dawn", the opening track of his first LP as part of the group. He recorded three albums with the Trio as high tenor. Denver also wrote a number of songs that were covered by the group, such as his hits "For Bobbi", "Leaving on a Jet Plane", as well as "Deal with The Ladies" (later recorded on his 1988 album, Higher Ground) and "Stay With Me". The group Denver, Boise, and Johnson, which had evolved from The Chad Mitchell Trio, released a single before he moved on to a solo career. The Trio also performed at college campuses across the United States.

Bill Danoff and Taffy Nivert, billed as Fat City and credited as co-writers of Denver's song "Take Me Home, Country Roads", were close friends of Denver and his family, appearing as singers and songwriters on many of Denver's albums until they formed the Starland Vocal Band in 1976. The band's albums were released on Denver's Windsong Records label, later known as Windstar Records.

Denver's solo recording contract resulted in part from the recording by Peter, Paul, and Mary of his song "Leaving on a Jet Plane", which became the sole number-one hit single for the group. Denver recorded songs by Tom Paxton, Eric Andersen, John Prine, David Mallett, and many others in the folk scene.

Australian singer Olivia Newton-John, whose appeal to pop, middle-of-the-road, and country audiences in the mid-1970s was similar to Denver's, sang backing vocals on Denver's 1975 single "Fly Away"; she performed the song with Denver on his 1975 Rocky Mountain Christmas special. She also covered his "Take Me Home, Country Roads", and had a hit in the United Kingdom (number 15 in 1973) and Japan (number 6 in a belated 1976 release) with it. In 1976, Denver and Newton-John appeared as guest stars on The Carpenters' First Television Special, a one-hour special broadcast on the ABC Television network.

== Awards and recognition ==
Academy of Country Music

- 1974 Album of the Year for Back Home Again

American Music Awards

- 1975 Favorite Pop/Rock Male Artist
- 1976 Favorite Country Album for Back Home Again
- 1976 Favorite Country Male Artist

Country Music Association

- 1975 Entertainer of the Year
- 1975 Song of the Year for "Back Home Again"

Emmy Awards

- 1975 Emmy for Outstanding Variety, Music or Comedy Special for An Evening with John Denver

Grammy Awards

- 1997 Best Musical Album For Children for All Aboard!
- 1998 Grammy Hall of Fame Award for "Take Me Home, Country Roads"

Songwriters Hall of Fame

- Inducted in 1996

=== Other recognition ===
- Poet laureate of Colorado, 1977
- People's Choice Awards, 1977
- Ten Outstanding Young Americans, 1979
- Freedoms Foundation Award, Valley Forge, Pennsylvania, 1980
- Carl Sandburg People's Poet Award, 1982
- NASA Exceptional Public Service Medal, 1985
- Albert Schweitzer Music Award, 1993

John Denver's Trapdoor Spider (Cyclocosmia johndenveri Sherwood, Warhol & Bianco, 2025) was described in 2025 by a joint British and American team of arachnologists in a paper titled "Country roads, take me home: Cyclocosmia johndenveri, a new species of trapdoor spider from the mountains of West Virginia (Araneae: Halonoproctidae)"

== Discography ==
Studio albums

- John Denver Sings (1966)
- Rhymes & Reasons (1969)
- Take Me to Tomorrow (1970)
- Whose Garden Was This (1970)
- Poems, Prayers & Promises (1971)
- Aerie (1971)
- Rocky Mountain High (1972)
- Farewell Andromeda (1973)
- Back Home Again (1974)
- Windsong (1975)
- Rocky Mountain Christmas (1975)
- Spirit (1976)
- I Want to Live (1977)
- John Denver (1979)
- Autograph (1980)
- Some Days Are Diamonds (1981)
- Seasons of the Heart (1982)
- It's About Time (1983)
- Dreamland Express (1985)
- One World (1986)
- Higher Ground (1988)
- Earth Songs (1990)
- The Flower That Shattered the Stone (1990)
- Different Directions (1991)
- Love Again (1996)
- All Aboard! (1997)

== Filmography ==
Acting credits

- Owen Marshall, Counselor at Law: The Camerons Are A Special Clan (1973, as Clark)
- The Muppet Show as special guest
- McCloud: The Colorado Cattle Caper (1974, as Deputy Dewey Cobb)
- Oh, God! (1977, as Jerry Landers)
- Fire and Ice (1986, as Narrator)
- The Disney Sunday Movie: The Leftovers (1986, as Max Sinclair)
- The Christmas Gift (1986, as George Billings)
- Foxfire (1987, as Dillard Nations)
- Higher Ground (1988, as Jim Clayton)
- Walking Thunder (1997, as John McKay)

=== Alaska, the American Child ===
Alaska, the American Child is a documentary by John Denver. The film was funded primarily by Denver but received some assistance from ABC. The film was intended to garner support in Congress for H-39, which would have classified 95 million acres of federally-owned land in Alaska as parks and wildlife refuges.

In the documentary, Denver travels through the state, showcasing its natural beauty and the people who call Alaska home including Alaska Natives and bush pilots. He starts the documentary off, and ends it, with the song "American Child". Two other songs of his are included in the documentary.

== Selected writings ==
- The Children and the Flowers (1979), ISBN 0-914676-28-8
- Alfie the Christmas Tree (1990), ISBN 0-945051-25-5
- Take Me Home: An Autobiography (1994), ISBN 0-517-59537-0
- Poems, Prayers and Promises: The Art and Soul of John Denver (2004), ISBN 1-57560-617-8

== Sources ==
- Flippo, Chet (1998). "John Denver". Paul Kingsbury, editor. The Encyclopedia of Country Music: The Ultimate Guide to the Music. New York: Oxford University Press. p. 143. ISBN 0195116712. OCLC 1033568087.
- Martin, James M. (1977). John Denver: Rocky Mountain Wonderboy. New York: Pinnacle Books. ISBN 523400025. OCLC 2972342. SKU 40-002. Out of print biography of Denver with insight into Denver's impact of the 1970s music industry.
- Orth, Maureen (20 December 1976). "The Sunshine Boy". Newsweek. pp. 60–62, 65–66, 68.
  - Orth, Maureen, with Janet Huck (20 December 1976). "The Wiz of Showbiz". Newsweek. p. 65. Information on the role of Weintraub in shaping Denver's career, which has since been edited out of later versions of his biography.
