= Peter, Paul and Mary discography =

- Studio albums: 7
- EPs: 13
- Live albums: 8
- Compilation albums: 13
- Singles: 29
- Video albums: 7
- Children's albums: 2

This is the discography of American folk group Peter, Paul and Mary.

== Albums ==
=== Studio albums ===
Year	Title	Details	Peak chart positions			Certifications
Year	Title	Details	US	CAN	UK	Certifications
1962	Peter, Paul and Mary	Released: March 1962; Label: Warner Bros.	1	—	18	US: 2xPlatinum
1963	(Moving)	Released: January 1963; Label: Warner Bros.	2	4	—	US: Gold
1963	In the Wind	Released: October 1963; Label: Warner Bros.	1	1	11	US: Gold
1965	A Song Will Rise	Released: March 1965; Label: Warner Bros.	8	—	—	US: Gold
1965	See What Tomorrow Brings	Released: October 1965; Label: Warner Bros.	11	—	—	US: Gold
1966	The Peter, Paul and Mary Album	Released: August 1966; Label: Warner Bros.	22	—	—	
1967	Album 1700	Released: August 1967; Label: Warner Bros.	15	14	—	US: Platinum
1968	Late Again	Released: August 1968; Label: Warner Bros.-Seven Arts	14	10	—	
1978	Reunion	Released: September 5, 1978; Label: Warner Bros.	106	—	—	
1986	No Easy Walk to Freedom	Released: September 1986; Label: Gold Castle	173	—	—	
1990	Flowers and Stones	Released: November 1990; Label: Gold Castle	—	—	—	
1995	(LifeLines)	Released: April 11, 1995; Label: Warner Bros.	—	—	—	
2003	In These Times	Released: November 11, 2003; Label: Rhino/Warner Bros.	—	—	—	
"—" denotes releases that did not chart or were not released in that territory.

=== Children's albums ===
Year	Title	Details	Peak chart positions		Certifications
Year	Title	Details	US	CAN	Certifications
1969	Peter, Paul and Mommy	Released: May 25, 1969; Label: Warner Bros.-Seven Arts	12	8	US: Gold
1993	Peter, Paul & Mommy, Too	Released: March 9, 1993; Label: Warner Bros.; Recorded live at the Brooklyn Academy of Music	—	—	
"—" denotes releases that did not chart or were not released in that territory.

=== Live albums ===
Year	Title	Details	Peak chart positions		Certifications
Year	Title	Details	US	UK	Certifications
1964	In Concert	Released: July 24, 1964; Label: Warner Bros.; Released in the UK as two volumes, the first of which was the charting album	4	20	US: Gold
1967	Deluxe/Peter, Paul and Mary in Japan	Released: May 1967; Label: Warner Bros.; Japan-only release	—	—	
1983	Such Is Love	Released: April 1982; Label: Peter, Paul and Mary Co.; First released in 1982 in Australia, before being released in the US in 1983	—	—	
1988	A Holiday Celebration	Released: October 1988; Label: Gold Castle; With the New York Choral Society	— (Note: A Holiday Celebration did not enter the Billboard Hot 100, but did peak at number 29 on the Top Holiday Albums chart.)	—	
1996	LifeLines Live	Released: August 6, 1996; Label: Warner Bros.	—	—	
2010	The Prague Sessions	Released: March 9, 2010; Label: Rhino	— (Note: The Prague Sessions did not enter the Billboard Hot 100, but did peak at number 6 on the Folk Albums chart.)	—	
2014	Discovered: Live in Concert	Released: November 14, 2014; Label: Rhino; Collection of live songs from the 1980s onward that were never recorded in a studio	—	—	
2019	At Newport 1963–65	Released: November 16, 2019; Label: Shout! Factory; Collection of live songs recorded between 1963 and 1965 at Newport Folk Festival	—	—	
"—" denotes releases that did not chart or were not released in that territory.

=== Compilation albums ===
Year	Title	Details	Peak chart positions			Certifications
Year	Title	Details	US	CAN	UK	Certifications
1967	The Best of Peter, Paul and Mary	Released: February 1967; Label: Warner Bros.-Seven Arts	—	—	—	
1970	The Best of Peter, Paul and Mary: Ten Years Together	Released: May 1970; Label: Warner Bros.	15	9	60	US: 2xPlatinum
1972	The Most Beautiful Songs of Peter, Paul and Mary	Released: 1972; Label: Warner Bros.	—	—	—	
1998	Around the Campfire	Released: April 28, 1998; Label: Warner Bros.	—	—	—	
1998	The Collection: Their Greatest Hits & Finest Performances	Released: 1998; Label: Reader's Digest	—	—	—	
1999	Songs of Conscience & Concern: A Retrospective Collection	Released: March 23, 1999; Label: Virgin	—	—	—	
1999	Weave Me the Sunshine	Released: August 6, 1999; Label: Audio Book & Music Company	—	—	—	
2004	Carry It On	Released: February 24, 2004; Label: Rhino; 4-CD box set with DVD	—	—	—	
2005	The Very Best of Peter Paul and Mary	Released: August 23, 2005; Label: Rhino	—	—	—	ARIA: Gold
2008	The Solo Recordings (1971–72)	Released: November 18, 2008; Label: Warner Bros./Rhino; 3-CD set comprising the group's members' first three solo albums: Peter, Paul And and Mary.	—	—	—	
2013	If I Had a Hammer: The Legend Begins	Released: August 15, 2013; Label: Remember	—	—	—	
2018	Drop the Needle on the Hits: Best of Peter, Paul & Mary	Released: November 16, 2018; Label: Barnes Noble Consign; Exclusive vinyl-only release	—	—	—	
2020	Anthology: The Deluxe Collection	Released: September 25, 2020; Label: Master Tape; Digital-only release	—	—	—	
"—" denotes releases that did not chart or were not released in that territory.

=== Video albums ===
Year	Title	Details
1986	25th Anniversary Concert	Released: September 20, 1986; Label: VideoArts; Formats: LaserDisc; Japan-only release
1990	Holiday Concert	Released: 1991; Label: Rhino Home Video; Formats: VHS
1993	Peter, Paul & Mommy, Too	Released: March 1993; Label: Warner Reprise Video; Formats: VHS
1996	Lifelines Live	Released: May 14, 1996; Label: Warner Reprise Video; Formats: VHS
2004	Carry It On – A Musical Legacy	Released: 2004; Label: Warner Music Vision/Rhino Home Video; Formats: DVD
2008	We Shall Overcome	Released: February 2008; Label: Veo Star; Formats: DVD; Germany-only release
2014	50 Years with Peter Paul And Mary	Released: 2014; Label: Peter, Paul & Mary; Formats: DVD

== EPs ==
Year	Title (Note: This is a list of EPs released in the UK. Several promotional EPs were released in the US and various others EPs were released in other territories.)	Details	Peak chart positions
Year	Title	Details	UK
1963	Peter, Paul and Mary	Released: October 1963; Label: Warner Bros.	3
1963	Peter, Paul and Mary – Vol. 2	Released: December 1963; Label: Warner Bros.	5
1964	Moving	Released: February 1964; Label: Warner Bros.	16
1964	In the Wind Vol. 1	Released: September 1964; Label: Warner Bros.	12
1964	In the Wind Vol. 2	Released: October 1964; Label: Warner Bros.	—
1965	Paultalk	Released: August 1965; Label: Warner Bros.	—
1965	Peter, Paul and Mary in Concert Vol. 1	Released: October 1965; Label: Warner Bros.	—
1966	Oh, Rock My Soul	Released: February 1966; Label: Warner Bros.	—
1966	Wasn't That a Time	Released: April 1966; Label: Warner Bros.	—
1966	Cruel War	Released: July 1966; Label: Warner Bros.	—
1966	The Last Thing on My Mind	Released: October 1966; Label: Warner Bros.	—
1967	If I Were Free	Released: February 1967; Label: Warner Bros.	—
1972	Peter, Paul and Mary	Released: November 1972; Label: Warner Bros.; Compilation EP	—
"—" denotes releases that did not chart.

== Singles ==
Year	Titles (A-side, B-side) Both sides from same album except where indicated	Peak chart positions											Album
Year	Titles (A-side, B-side) Both sides from same album except where indicated	US	US (AC)	AUS	BE (WA)	CAN	GER	IRE	NZ	QUE	SA	UK	Album
1962	"Lemon Tree" b/w "Early in the Morning"	35	12	—	—	4	—	—	—	—	—	—	Peter, Paul and Mary
1962	"If I Had a Hammer (The Hammer Song)" b/w "Gone the Rainbow" (from Moving)	10	—	26	—	17	—	—	—	12	—	—	Peter, Paul and Mary
1962	"Big Boat" b/w "Tiny Sparrow"	93	—	—	—	20	—	—	—	—	—	—	(Moving)
1963	"Settle Down (Goin' Down That Highway)" b/w "500 Miles" (from Peter, Paul and Mary)	56	14	—	—	—	—	—	—	—	—	—	(Moving)
1963	"Puff (The Magic Dragon)" b/w "Pretty Mary"	2	1	6	—	5	—	—	3	2	—	—	(Moving)
1963	"Blowin' in the Wind" b/w "Flora" (from (Moving))	2	1	11	—	25	32	—	2	1	—	13	In the Wind
1963	"Don't Think Twice, It's All Right" b/w "Autumn to May" (from Peter, Paul and Mary)	9	2	56	—	15	—	—	—	5	—	—	In the Wind
1963	"Stewball" b/w "The Cruel War" (from Peter, Paul and Mary)	35	17	89	—	21	—	—	—	22	—	—	In the Wind
1963	"A'Soalin'" b/w "Hush-a-Bye" (from In the Wind)	— (Note: "A'Soalin'" did not enter the Billboard Hot 100, but did peak at number 79 on the Cash Box Top 100 Singles.)	—	61	—	—	—	—	—	—	—	—	(Moving)
1964	"Tell It on the Mountain" b/w "Old Coat" (from (Moving))	33	7	8	—	22	—	—	—	30	—	33	In the Wind
1964	"Oh Rock My Soul (Part 1)" b/w " Oh Rock My Soul (Part 2)"	93	—	16	—	—	—	—	—	—	—	—	In Concert
1964	"The Times They Are a-Changin'" (UK and Netherlands-only release) b/w "Blue"	—	—	—	—	—	—	—	—	—	—	44	In Concert
1965	"For Lovin' Me" b/w "Monday Morning"	30	5	36	—	4	—	—	—	27	—	—	A Song Will Rise
1965	"When the Ship Comes In" b/w "The Times They Are a-Changin'" (US, from In Concert); "The Cuckoo" (UK)	91	23	17 (Note: Charted as a double A-side in Australia.)	—	—	—	—	—	—	—	—	A Song Will Rise
1965	"Early Morning Rain" b/w "The Rising of the Moon"	91	13	34	—	39	—	—	—	—	—	—	See What Tomorrow Brings
1965	"San Francisco Bay Blues"(Australia-only release) b/w "Come and Go with Me"	—	—	43	—	—	—	—	—	—	—	—	A Song Will Rise
1966	"The Cruel War" (from Peter, Paul and Mary) b/w "Mon Vrai Destin"	52	4	—	—	78	—	—	—	—	—	—	The Peter, Paul and Mary Album
1966	"The Other Side of This Life" b/w "Sometime Lovin'"	100	33	—	—	—	—	—	—	—	—	—	The Peter, Paul and Mary Album
1966	"Hurry Sundown" b/w "For Baby (For Bobbie)"	123	37	—	—	—	—	—	—	—	—	—	The Peter, Paul and Mary Album
1967	"I Dig Rock and Roll Music" b/w "The Great Mandella (The Wheel of Life)"	9	—	4	9	15	—	—	9	8	—	55 (Note: Chart position is from the official UK "Breakers List".)	Album 1700
1967	"The House Song" (UK-only release) b/w "Bob Dylan's Dream"	—	—	—	—	—	—	—	—	—	—	—	Album 1700
1967	"Too Much of Nothing" b/w "The House Song" (from Album 1700)	35	—	81	—	43	—	—	18	—	—	—	Late Again
1968	"Love City (Postcard from Duluth)" b/w "Yesterday's Tomorrow"	113	—	—	—	90	—	—	—	—	—	—	Late Again
1969	"Day Is Done" b/w "Make Believe Town"	21	7	—	—	17	—	—	—	—	—	—	Peter, Paul and Mommy
1969	"Leaving on a Jet Plane" b/w "The House Song"	1	1	30	—	1	—	2	—	2	6	2	Album 1700
1969	"The Marvelous Toy" b/w "Christmas Dinner"	—	—	—	—	—	—	—	—	—	—	—	Peter, Paul and Mommy
1978	"Like the First Time" b/w "Best of Friends"	—	—	—	—	—	—	—	—	—	—	—	Reunion
1978	"Forever Young" b/w "Best of Friends"	—	—	—	—	—	—	—	—	—	—	—	Reunion
1983	"El Salvador" (with the Bodyworks Band) b/w "Light One Candle"	—	—	—	—	—	—	—	—	—	—	—	No Easy Walk to Freedom
"—" denotes releases that did not chart or were not released in that territory.
