= The Best of Peter, Paul and Mary: Ten Years Together =

The Best of Peter, Paul, and Mary: Ten Years Together

Greatest hits album by Peter, Paul, and Mary
- Released: 1970
- Genre: Folk
- Length: 37:48
- Label: Warner Bros.
- Producer: Albert B. Grossman, Milton Okun

Peter, Paul, and Mary chronology
Peter, Paul and Mommy (1969)	The Best of Peter, Paul, and Mary: Ten Years Together (1970)	Reunion (1978)

The Best of Peter, Paul, and Mary: Ten Years Together is a 1970 greatest hits release by American folk trio Peter, Paul, and Mary. It is the last album released before the group split up in 1970.

The album includes all of their greatest hits, including their only #1 hit "Leaving On A Jet Plane", "If I Had a Hammer", and their versions of the Bob Dylan songs "Blowin' in the Wind", "Don't Think Twice, It's All Right," and "Too Much of Nothing," along with others. The thirteen cuts were taken from the trio's 1962 debut album, Peter, Paul and Mary (Lemon Tree, 500 Miles, If I Had a Hammer), and their follow-up albums: In the Wind (1963) (Blowin' in the Wind, Stewball, Don't Think Twice), Album 1700 (1967) (I Dig Rock and Roll Music, Leaving on a Jet Plane), (Moving) (1963) (Puff), A Song Will Rise (1965) (For Lovin' Me), See What Tomorrow Brings (1965) (Early Mornin' Rain), Late Again (1968) (Too Much of Nothing), and Peter, Paul and Mommy (1969) (Day Is Done).

Ten Years Together was released on Warner Brothers Label 2552 in 1970, with cover art by Milton Glaser. Due to the trio's 1970 breakup, this would be their last album together until 1978's Reunion album. AllMusic's Bruce Eder praises this compilation as a close cross-section of PP&M's eclectic sound, nicely highlighting the group's evolution during the prior decade from the acoustic folk sound that helped popularize several early Dylan compositions, to their later use of electric guitar and drums on hits like "Too Much of Nothing" — another Dylan contribution, but from his later sound, composed in 1967, but not released by Dylan himself until 1975.

== Track listing ==
1. "Blowin' in the Wind", (Bob Dylan) – 2:58
2. "Too Much of Nothing" (Bob Dylan) – 2:32
3. "Lemon Tree" (Will Holt) – 2:52
4. "Stewball" (Elena Mezzetti-Stookey-Okun-Travers) – 3:09
5. "Early Morning Rain" (Gordon Lightfoot) – 3:13
6. "500 Miles" (Hedy West) – 2:55
7. "I Dig Rock and Roll Music" (Stookey-James Mason-Dave Dixon) – 2:31
8. "Leaving on a Jet Plane" (John Denver) – 3:27
9. "Puff (The Magic Dragon)" (Peter Yarrow-Leonard Lipton) – 3:25
10. "For Lovin' Me" (Gordon Lightfoot) – 2:08
11. "Don't Think Twice, It's All Right" (Bob Dylan) – 3:12
12. "If I Had a Hammer (The Hammer Song)" (Pete Seeger-Lee Hayes) – 2:05
13. "Day Is Done" (Peter Yarrow) – 3:22
