= Peter, Paul and Mary (EP) =

EP 45 rpm record by an American film trio

Peter, Paul and Mary (EP) was an EP 45 rpm record by the American folk trio Peter, Paul and Mary, released on Warner Brothers and Decca Records in the UK in 1963, WEP 6114, in mono. The record reached #3 in the British EP charts.

== Songs ==
Side 1

- Blowing in the Wind (Dylan)
- Lemon Tree (Holt)

Side 2

- If I Had a Hammer, (Pete Seeger, Hays)
- Where Have All the Flowers Gone? (Seeger)

== Personnel ==
- Peter Yarrow, guitar, vocals
- Paul Stookey, guitar, vocals
- Mary Travers, vocals
- unidentified bass player
