= Peter, Paul & Mommy, Too =

Children's album by the trio Peter, Paul and Mary

Live album by Peter, Paul and Mary
- Released: March 9, 1993
- Genre: Children, folk
- Length: 54:53
- Label: Warner Bros.
- Producer: Peter Yarrow

Peter, Paul and Mary chronology
Flowers and Stones (1990)	Peter, Paul & Mommy, Too (1993)	PPM & (Lifelines) (1995)

Professional ratings
Review scores
Source	Rating
Allmusic	4/5 stars

Peter, Paul & Mommy, Too, released on Warner Bros. in 1993, is a children's album by the trio Peter, Paul and Mary. It was recorded on October 31 and November 1, 1992, at the Brooklyn Academy of Music's Harvey Theater (formerly known as the Majestic Theatre). The album follows from the first children's album they released in 1969, Peter, Paul and Mommy.

== Track listing ==
1. "Puff (The Magic Dragon)" (Leonard Lipton, Peter Yarrow) – 4:20
2. "The Fox" (Traditional, Paul Stookey, Mary Travers, Yarrow) – 2:52
3. "Somagawaza/Hey, Motswala" (Traditional) – 2:51
4. "Inside" (Stookey, Paul Hill) – 4:38
5. "Garden Song" (David Mallett) – 4:03
6. "The Eddystone Light" (Traditional, Travers, Yarrow) – 2:35
7. "I Know an Old Lady (Who Swallowed a Fly)" (Rose Bonne, Alan Mills) – 6:27
8. "Somos el Barco" (Lorre Wyatt) – 3:57
9. "Pastures of Plenty" (Woody Guthrie) – 3:26
10. "Medley: Home on the Range/Don't Ever Take Away My Freedom" (Traditional/Yarrow) – 5:51
11. "Right Field" (Willy Welch) – 3:52
12. "Poem for Erika/For Baby" (John Denver, Travers) – 4:31
13. "We Shall Overcome" (Guy Carawan, Frank Hamilton, Zilphia Horton, Pete Seeger) – 4:04

The video includes the following additional songs:

- Day is Done (played after Inside)
- All Mixed Up (played after Home on the Range/Don't Ever Take Away My Freedom)
- It's Raining (played after We Shall Overcome)
- If I Had a Hammer
- Blowin' in the Wind
- This Land is Your Land

== Personnel ==
- Peter Yarrow – vocals, guitar, piano
- Noel Paul Stookey – vocals, guitar
- Mary Travers – vocals
- Sue Evans – percussion
- Richard Kniss – bass
- Paul Prestopino – guitar, banjo, mandolin, harmonica, kalimba, Dobro

=== Production ===
- Mastering – Ted Jensen at Sterling Sound, NYC

== See also ==
- Peter, Paul and Mommy
