= Union Maid =

Song by Woody Guthrie
- Written: June 1940
- Composer(s): adapted from Robert Schumann, Kerry Mills
- Lyricist(s): Woody Guthrie

"Union Maid" is a union song, with lyrics written by Woody Guthrie in response to a request for a union song from a female point of view. The melody is the 1907 standard "Red Wing" by Kerry Mills, which was in turn adapted from Robert Schumann's piano composition "The Happy Farmer, Returning From Work" in his 1848 Album for the Young, Opus 68.

Along with "Talking Union", this song was one of the many pro-union songs written by Guthrie during his time as a member of the Almanac Singers. Another member, Pete Seeger, writes:

"I'm proud to say I was present when 'Union Maid' was written in June, 1940, in the plain little office of the Oklahoma City Communist Party. Bob Wood, local organizer, had asked Woody Guthrie and me to sing there the night before for a small group of striking oil workers. Early next morning, Woody got to the typewriter and hammered out the first two verses of 'Union Maid' set to a European tune that Robert Schumann arranged for piano ('The Merry Farmer') back in the early 1800s. Of course, it's the chorus that really makes it - its tune, 'Red Wing,' was copyrighted early in the 1900s."

The song's final verse, on women's role in unions, was written later by Millard Lampell and other Almanac members. In performance, this verse has been adapted over the years to reflect changing attitudes, or dropped altogether. An alternate version, credited to Nancy Katz, appears in the 1973 (34th) and subsequent editions of the IWW's Little Red Songbook, and starts, "A woman’s struggle is hard, even with a union card"; another version in the 1985 song anthology Carry It On! edited by Seeger and Bob Reiser urges women to "Like Mother Jones, bestir them bones".

The 1973 single "Part of the Union" by British rock band The Strawbs draws on similar themes to Guthrie's song, to the extent that some sections - in particular the second verse - could be considered as a cover version. This song has also been adopted by supporters of the Philadelphia Union soccer team, who will sing the chorus of the song outside of and at matches.

== Recordings ==
- Almanac Singers on Talking Union
- Pete Seeger on If I Had a Hammer
- Old Crow Medicine Show on Big Iron World
- Julie Felix on The Frost Report
- Peter, Paul and Mary on In These Times (2003)
- Bill Collins and the Rabble Rousers on New Hard Times (2008)
- Stormy Six on Guarda giù dalla pianura (1974)
- Melanie Gruben on “Like a Tide Upon the Land” (2023)
