= Peter, Paul and Mommy =

Peter, Paul and Mary's first children's album

Studio album by Peter, Paul and Mary
- Released: May 25, 1969
- Genre: Children, folk
- Length: 34:56
- Label: Warner Bros.-Seven Arts
- Producer: Milt Okun

Peter, Paul and Mary chronology
Late Again (1968)	Peter, Paul and Mommy (1969)	The Best of Peter, Paul and Mary: Ten Years Together (1970)

Singles from Peter, Paul and Mommy
- 1. "Day Is Done" Released: March 24, 1969

Professional ratings
Review scores
Source	Rating
Allmusic	3/5 stars

Peter, Paul and Mommy, released on Warner Bros. in 1969, is the trio Peter, Paul and Mary's first children's album. It contains hits like "Puff the Magic Dragon", among others. The album reached No. 12 on Billboard's Top LPs chart. The single "Day is Done" reached number 7 on the Easy Listening chart and number 21 on the Pop Singles chart.

At the Grammy Awards of 1970, Peter, Paul and Mommy won the Grammy for Best Recording for Children.

== Background ==
According to Paul Stookey, the album grew naturally from the fact that all the previous albums the trio had released contain at least one children's song. The album contains new songs as well as some songs they had previously recorded. Songs such as "It's Raining" and "Puff (The Magic Dragon)", found on earlier albums, were re-recorded for the album with a backing children choir. The single "Day is Done", written by Peter Yarrow, is also a different recording from the one on the album. "The Marvelous Toy" and "Going To The Zoo" are songs by Tom Paxton.

== Track listing ==
1. "The Marvelous Toy" (Tom Paxton) Cherry Lane Music, Inc. ASCAP
2. "Day Is Done" (Peter Yarrow)
3. "Leatherwing Bat" (Adapted & Arranged by Yarrow, Stookey)
4. "I Have A Song To Sing, O!" (Gilbert & Sullivan, from "Yeomen of the Guard," Adapted & Arranged by Yarrow, Travers, Stookey, Okun)
5. "All Through The Night" (Adapted & Arranged by Yarrow, Stookey, Travers)
6. "It's Raining" (Adapted & Arranged by Stookey, Yarrow, Chandler)
7. "Going to the Zoo" (Tom Paxton) Cherry Lane Music, Inc. ASCAP
8. "Boa Constrictor" (Shel Silverstein) Tro-Hollis Music, Inc. BMI
9. "Make-Believe Town" (Yarrow, Elaina Mezzetti)
10. "Mockingbird" (Adapted & Arranged by Travers, Stookey, Yarrow)
11. "Christmas Dinner" (Paul Stookey)
12. "Puff (The Magic Dragon)" (Lenny Lipton, Yarrow)

All songs published by Pepamar Music Corp. ASCAP except as indicated.

== Personnel ==
Peter, Paul and Mary

- Peter Yarrow – vocals, guitar
- Noel "Paul" Stookey – vocals, guitar, banjo
- Mary Travers – vocals

with:

- Russell Savakus – double bass
- Paul Prestopino – guitar, banjo, mandolin, dobro

Technical

- Produced by Milton Okun
- Musical Director: Milton Okun
- Associate Producer: Phil Ramone
- Engineers: Don Hahn, Phil Ramone
- Front Cover Photo: Allen Vogel
- Cover Design: Milton Glaser
- Back Cover Photo: Victor Lassiter
- Children Appear Through the Courtesy of the Nursery School, Westchester Ethical Society
- Direction: Ken Fritz Management, Los Angeles

== Charts ==
Chart (1969)	Peak position
US Billboard 200	12

== See also ==
- Peter, Paul & Mommy, Too
