= The Chad Mitchell Trio =

North American vocal group

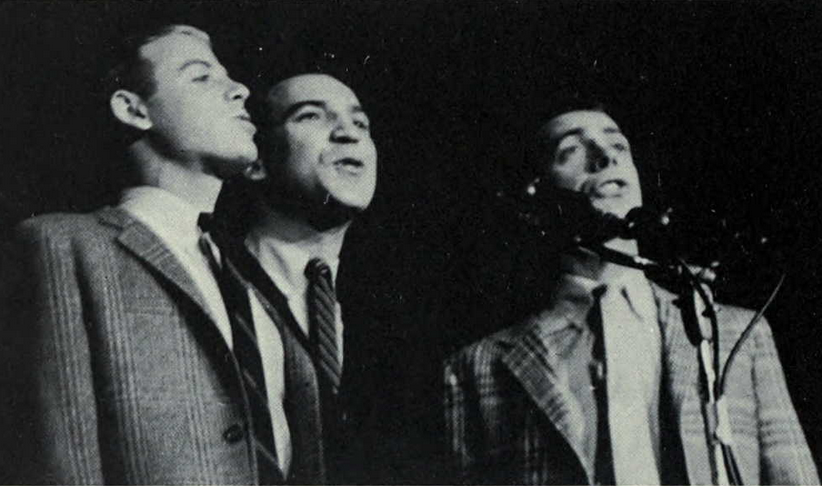
- Chad Mitchell Trio at the University of Michigan, c. 1965

Background information
- Also known as: The Mitchell Trio
- Origin: Spokane, Washington, United States
- Genres: Folk, folk revival
- Years active: 1958–1967; 1987; 2005–2014
- Labels: Colpix; Kapp; Mercury; Reprise
- Past members: Chad Mitchell; Mike Kobluk; Mike Pugh; Joe Frazier; John Denver; David Boise; Michael Johnson
- Website: chadmitchelltrio.com

The Chad Mitchell Trio, later known as The Mitchell Trio, were an American vocal group whose peak years were during the 1960s. They performed traditional folk songs and some of John Denver's early compositions. They were particularly notable for performing satirical songs that criticized current events during the time of the Cold War, the civil rights movement, and the Vietnam War.

== As Chad Mitchell Trio (1958–1965) ==
The original group was formed in 1958 by William Chadbourne "Chad" Mitchell (from Portland, Oregon, born December 5, 1936), Mike Kobluk (from Trail, British Columbia, Canada, born December 10, 1937), and Mike Pugh (from Pasco, Washington) when they were students and glee club members at Gonzaga University in Spokane, Washington, United States. They were encouraged by Spokane Catholic priest Reinard W. Beaver, who invited the three to travel with him to New York City in the summer of 1959 and to try performing in the burgeoning folk-music scene.

The key people who helped the trio were musical arranger Milton Okun and star performer/singer Harry Belafonte. Okun provided a professional polish to their performing skills, which helped them gain both a key booking at New York City's Blue Angel club and radio appearances with Arthur Godfrey and television appearances with Pat Boone. Belafonte featured the group in his May 1960 Carnegie Hall concert and signed them to his Belafonte Enterprises management firm.

In the summer of 1960, Pugh left the group to return to college. After auditioning over 150 singers, the group chose Joe Frazier (born in Lebanon, Pennsylvania, on January 14, 1937) to replace Pugh.

After recording mostly conventional folk songs, the trio released a then-daring satire of the John Birch Society, which established their ability to perform more controversial material. Their departure from Belafonte Enterprises in 1962, followed by their move to Mercury Records in 1963, gave them more freedom to add aggressively political songs to their body of folk, love, and world-music songs. They appeared on a variety of American TV shows, including The Bell Telephone Hour and Hootenanny.

== Personnel changes and renaming (1965–1969) ==
Mitchell left the trio in 1965 to embark on a solo singing career. Another audition process replaced him with the young (and unknown) singer-songwriter John Denver. The group retained the "Mitchell Trio" name, with Denver writing some of the group's songs.

Frazier's departure from the trio in 1966 brought in replacement David Boise. After a final live release, Kobluk left; Denver and Boise replaced Kobluk with Michael Johnson (who later recorded "Bluer Than Blue" as a solo artist) and because of contractual requirements that prohibited using the "Mitchell" name after the last original member left became "Denver, Boise and Johnson." Shortly thereafter, however, the group disbanded in 1969.

== Later careers and reunions ==
Mike Kobluk, Joe Frazier and David Boise later left the music industry; Chad Mitchell released a number of solo albums before retiring from music; Denver's time with the trio became the springboard to his successful solo career. Michael Johnson recorded more than 15 albums as a solo artist; he died at his Minneapolis home on July 25, 2017. Frazier became an Episcopal Church priest.

The Mitchell/Kobluk/Frazier trio and John Denver united in 1987 for several concerts, some broadcast on PBS. These are the only recordings of all four singing together.

The Mitchell/Kobluk/Frazier trio reunited again in 2005 for a short program, as part of a concert also featuring Tom Paxton and The Kingston Trio's current lineup, in Minneapolis, Minnesota. Mitchell/Kobluk/Frazier reunited again for a one-night performance on October 6, 2007, in Spokane, home of their alma mater, and where Mitchell and Kobluk live about two blocks apart. For several years they continued to tour with artists like Tom Paxton and performed for President Obama at a 40th anniversary celebration in Washington D.C. for Representative Dave Obey, who is a fan of the group. Concerts in 2009 were part of a 50th Anniversary tour that culminated with a benefit in Big Bear Lake, California, in December.

Joe Frazier died in his sleep on March 28, 2014, at the age of 77.

Chad Mitchell, Mike Kobluk, and group bassist Ron Greenstein performed their farewell concert on November 15, 2014, at Bethesda Blues & Jazz in Bethesda, Maryland.

== Featured personnel ==
Other featured musicians for the trio through the years included:

- Jim McGuinn (who later founded The Byrds and took the name Roger McGuinn): Guitar, banjo
- Paul Prestopino: Guitar, 12 string guitar, banjo, and mandolin.
- Bob Hefferan: Guitar
- Pete Soloway: Acoustic bass
- Dennis Collins: Guitar
- Vic Messer: Guitar
- Bill Lee: Bass
- Fred Hellerman: Guitar
- Erik Darling: Banjo
- Jacob Ander: Guitar
- Bruce Langhorne: Guitar
- Norman Keenan: Bass
- Clyde Lombardi: Bass
- John Frigo: Bass
- Jim Atlas: Bass
- Ron Greenstein: Bass and vocals

== Songs ==
The Trio's first recordings for Colpix were similar to the conventional folk songs that were gaining popularity then as an alternative to the early rock-and-roll genre. It was songs from their first Kapp Records release — "Mighty Day" (about the 1900 Galveston, Texas hurricane); "Rum By Gum" (about the Temperance/Prohibition movement); and "Lizzie Borden" (an irreverent satire countering the common heroizing of the accused axe murderer) — which began to make the Trio distinct.

Their next Kapp album contained "The John Birch Society". "The Ides of Texas" from their final Kapp release took aim at financier Billie Sol Estes.

Their live performance album At The Bitter End on Kapp Records also included the song "Moscow Nights" with its original Russian lyrics, despite the Cold War era of strained relations between the U.S. and the U.S.S.R.

The trio's Mercury albums continued its trend to record topical and controversial songs. "Twelve Days" imagined a group of former Nazis singing new lyrics to the old Christmas carol; a similar theme would be explored later in the "I Was Not A Nazi Polka". "Barry's Boys" ("You too can join the crew/Tippecanoe and Nixon, too"), a song from Julius Monk's "Dime a Dozen", which portrayed a view of the followers of conservative Republican 1964 Presidential candidate Barry Goldwater. "A Dying Business" went after funeral costs and customs, while "The Draft Dodger Rag" (by Phil Ochs: "Sarge, I'm only eighteen/I got a ruptured spleen/And I always carry a purse") explored the beginnings of resistance to the Vietnam War. "What Kind of Life Is That" pondered on celebrity fame (specifically, that of Elizabeth Taylor). "Alma Mater" ("We'll miss the classrooms/Where we learned/And effigies we burned") discussed the Ole Miss riots and took on segregationist policies at the University of Mississippi and was followed later by "Your Friendly, Liberal, Neighborhood Ku-Klux-Klan".

While the Mitchell Trio became best known for such songs, they also produced a solid body of work which showed that folk music could be "polished" yet remain close to its roots. They recorded shanties numbers like "Whup Jamboree" and "The Golden Vanity", as well as folk dance numbers like "Hello Susan Brown". Their rendition of the southern traditional prison work song “Ain’t No More Cane On This Brazos” combines lyrics from several different established versions from over the years. They could do rousing gospel music numbers like "You Can Tell The World", "I Feel So Good About It (Sin Bound Train)", and "One Day When I Was Lost (Easter Morn)". They were the first folk group to record many of the songs of Tom Paxton, such as "The Marvelous Toy", "What Did You Learn In School Today?", and "We Didn't Know". They also sang the work of Woody Guthrie ("The Great Historical Bum (Bragging Song)"), Shel Silverstein ("The Hip Song (It Does Not Pay To Be Hip)", "Yowzah", "Three Legged Man"), and Bob Dylan ("Blowin' in the Wind" (they were in fact the first to release it, but Peter, Paul and Mary's subsequent rendition became the best-known cover version), "With God On Our Side", "Mr. Tambourine Man").

The Mitchell Trio also did the first major recording of John Denver's later hit "For Baby (For Bobbi)" and also handled his "Leaving on a Jet Plane". Their final album offered a soft, harmonized version of The Beatles' "She Loves You". Kobluk's 1964 solo vocal on Ewan MacColl's "The First Time Ever I Saw Your Face" pre-dated Roberta Flack’s 1969 recording which became a major hit in 1972.

== Influence and legacy ==
Johnny Cash cited their version of "Four Strong Winds" as a stylistic influence and included it on his Artist's Choice album of favorites.

The 2003 mockumentary A Mighty Wind featured The Folksmen, a group described "as a more leftish variation on the Chad Mitchell Trio."

== Discography ==
=== Albums ===
Chad Mitchell, Mike Kobluk, Mike Pugh:

- The Chad Mitchell Trio (Colpix, 1959; reissued 1964 as The Chad Mitchell Trio Arrives!)
- In Concert - Everybody's Listening (Colpix, 1964; pre-1960 recordings of the Trio on Side One only, with Side Two featuring "The Gatemen")

Chad Mitchell, Mike Kobluk, Joe Frazier:

- Mighty Day on Campus (Kapp, 1961) No. 39
- At the Bitter End (Kapp, 1962) No. 81
- In Action (Kapp, 1962; re-issued as Blowin' in the Wind) No. 87
- The Best Of (Kapp, 1963) No. 63
- Singin' Our Mind (Mercury, 1963) No. 39
- Reflecting (Mercury, 1964) No. 29
- Slightly Irreverent (Mercury, 1964) No. 128
- Typical American Boys (Mercury, 1965) No. 130
- The George Bush Society (No Label, 2008)

Mike Kobluk, Joe Frazier, John Denver:

- That's the Way It's Gonna Be (Mercury, Aug 1965)
- Violets of Dawn (Mercury, Dec 1965)
- Beginnings (Mercury, 1974) sub-titled, John Denver with the Mitchell Trio

Mike Kobluk, John Denver, David Boise:

- Alive! (Reprise, 1967; final album of 'original' career)

Chad Mitchell solo

- Chad Mitchell/Himself (Warner Bros., 1966)
- Love, A Feeling Of (Warner Bros., 1967)
- Chad (Bell, 1969)
- Virgo Moon (Silver City, 1991)

Reunion albums:

- Mighty Day; The Chad Mitchell Trio Reunion (Folk Era, 1994)
- The Chad Mitchell Reunion... Part 2 (Folk Era, 1997)

=== Singles ===
Year	Single (A-side, B-side) Both sides from same album except where indicated	Chart positions		Album
Year	Single (A-side, B-side) Both sides from same album except where indicated	US	US AC	Album
1959	"Sally Ann" b/w "Vaya con Dios" (non-album track)			The Chad Mitchell Trio Arrives!
1959	"Up on the Mountain" b/w "Walkin' on Green Grass"			The Chad Mitchell Trio Arrives!
1960	"I Do Adore Her" b/w "Gallows Tree"			The Chad Mitchell Trio Arrives!
1960	"Pretty Saro" b/w "The Ballad of Herbie Spear" (non-album track)			The Chad Mitchell Trio Arrives!
1960	"Paddy West" b/w "The Devil Road" (non-album track)			The Chad Mitchell Trio Arrives!
1961	"Six Men"; B-side by Eugene LaMarr: "I'm Goin' Home"			Non-album tracks
1961	"Mighty Day" b/w "The Whistling Gypsy"			Mighty Day on Campus
1961	"Lizzie Borden" b/w "Super Skier"	44		Mighty Day on Campus
1962	"The John Birch Society" b/w "Golden Vanity"	99		The Chad Mitchell Trio at the Bitter End
1962	"Hello Susan Brown" b/w "You Can Tell the World"			The Chad Mitchell Trio at the Bitter End
1963	"Blowing in the Wind" b/w "Adios Mi Corazon"			In Action
1963	"Green Grow the Lilacs" b/w "Leave Me If You Want To"			In Action
1963	"The Marvelous Toy" b/w "The Bonny Streets of Fyve-lo"	43	20	Singin' Our Mind
1964	"Tell Old Bill" b/w "The Tarriers Song"			Reflecting
1964	"What Did You Learn in School Today" b/w "Barry's Boys"			Reflecting
1964	"I Can't Help But Wonder" b/w "Stewball and Griselda"			The Slightly Irreverent Mitchell Trio
1965	"You Were on My Mind" b/w "My Name Is Morgan"			Typical American Boys
1965	"Violets of Dawn" b/w "That's the Way It's Gonna Be" (from That's the Way It's Gonna Be)			Violets of Dawn
1966	"Your Friendly, Liberal, Neighborhood Ku-Klux-Klan" b/w "Violets of Dawn"			Violets of Dawn
1966	"Stay with Me" b/w "Dark Shadows and Empty Hallways"			Non-album tracks
1967	"Leaving on a Jet Plane" b/w "Baby, That's Where It Is" (non-album track)			Alive
1967	"She Loves You" b/w "Like to Deal with the Ladies"			Alive
1968	"Take Me to Tomorrow" b/w "The '68 Nixon"			Non-album tracks (as Denver, Boise and Johnson)
Chad Mitchell solo singles
1966	"Quiet Room" b/w "Violets of Dawn"			Chad Mitchell/Himself
1967	"Suzanne" b/w "Marieka" (from Chad Mitchell/Himself)			Love, A Feeling Of
1968	"For What It's Worth" b/w "Follow" (from Chad)			Non-album track
1969	"What's That Got to Do with Me" b/w "Bus Song"			Chad

DVDs:

- "Mighty Day" The Chad Mitchell Trio Reunion (1987)
- The Chad Mitchell Trio - Then & Now (3 disc DVD set)

== Sources ==
- The Mitchell Trio Song Book (Robert Shelton, editor/writer; Walter Rain, music editor; Quadrangle Books, Chicago, 1964 [Library Of Congress Catalog Card Number 64-24290] )
