= Leather-Winged Bat =

"Leather-Winged Bat" is an English folk song about a collection of "birds". The most frequently occurring creatures are a bat, a woodpecker, a bluebird, an owl and a turtledove (bats technically being mammals and not birds). However, depending on the artist, the song can have different creatures, such as Peter, Paul and Mary's 1969 version which has a bat, a black bird, wood pecker, turtle dove, and a blue jay. Each "bird" has something to say about love and courtship in some sort of rhyming manner. It was recorded by Burl Ives on 31 January 1941 and released in August 1941 on the album Okeh Presents the Wayfaring Stranger. It has also been recorded by Pete Seeger, The Duhks, Bill Staines, Spider John Koerner, Peter, Paul and Mary, Kitty White, Nettles, Vicki Neville, Kim Milai, Anne Price, Peggy Seeger, Warren Fremling and Megson (band). The song is a staple children's folk song, and a childhood favorite for many. The verses tend to begin with a line introducing the specific bird, followed by three lines that either explain each bird's misfortune in love, relating them back to physical characteristics the birds possess (for example, "Once I courted a handsome wench, she got scared and from me fled, and ever since then my head's been red," explaining what, metaphorically, caused the woodpecker's head to be red.) or three lines that offer highly opinionated advice on courtship (for example, "I'll tell you how to win her love, court her night and court her day, never give her time to say o-neigh!" as the turtle dove says).

== See also ==
- Peter, Paul and Mommy, an album
- When I Was a Lad, an album
