= In These Times (Peter, Paul, and Mary album) =

Studio album by Peter, Paul and Mary
- Released: November 11, 2003
- Recorded: 2003
- Genre: Folk
- Length: 42:07
- Label: Rhino Records (Warner Bros. Records)
- Producers: Peter Yarrow, Noel Paul Stookey

Peter, Paul and Mary chronology
Carry It On (2000)	In These Times (2003)	The Very Best of Peter, Paul & Mary (2005)

Professional ratings
Review scores
Source	Rating
Allmusic	4/5 stars

In These Times is the fifteenth and final album by Peter, Paul, and Mary released by Rhino Records (Warner Bros. Records) in 2003. The album has 12 new recordings with originals and selections by Pete Seeger, Anne Feeney, Gene Nelson, and other music artists. Several of the songs have a social justice theme. Giving it 4 out of 5 stars, Allmusic called the album "reassuring and refreshing".

== Track listing ==
1. "Union Medley: You Gotta Go Down and Join the Union/Put It on the Ground/Union Maid/We Shall Not Be Moved/Which Side Are You On?"
2. "Have You Been to Jail for Justice?"
3. "Jesus Is on the Wire"
4. "Don't Laugh at Me"
5. "Wayfaring Stranger"
6. "How Can I Keep from Singing?/The Great Storm Is Over"
7. "Invisible People"
8. "Of This World"
9. "Some Walls"
10. "All God's Critters"
11. "It's Magic"
12. "Oh, Had I a Golden Thread"

== Personnel ==
- Peter Yarrow – vocals, guitar
- Noel "Paul" Stookey – vocals, guitar
- Mary Travers – vocals
- Paul Prestopino – guitar, banjo, dobro, mandolin, harmonica
- Richard Kniss – bass
