= Peter, Paul and Mary (album) =

Studio album by Peter, Paul and Mary
- Released: March 1962
- Genre: Folk
- Length: 33:14
- Label: Warner Bros.
- Producer: Albert Grossman

Peter, Paul and Mary chronology
Peter, Paul and Mary (1962)	Moving (1963)

Singles from Peter, Paul and Mary
- 1. "Lemon Tree" Released: April 1962; 2. "If I Had a Hammer" Released: July 1962; 3. "500 Miles" Released: December 1962

Professional ratings
Review scores
Source	Rating
Allmusic	4/5 stars

Peter, Paul and Mary is the self-titled debut studio album by American folk trio Peter, Paul and Mary was released in March 1962 on Warner Bros. Records. Released in both mono and stereo on catalog no. 1449, it is one of the rare folk albums to reach No. 1 on the Billboard chart in the US, where it remained for over a month. The lead-off singles "If I Had a Hammer" and "Lemon Tree" reached numbers 10 and 35 respectively on the Billboard Pop Singles chart. It was the group's biggest selling studio album, eventually certified Double Platinum by the Recording Industry Association of America for U.S. sales of more than two million copies.

The album was reissued as 180 Gram vinyl in 2016 under the Waxtime Label as #772125. The Waxtime issue has three Bonus tracks: which are side 1 #7 – "One Kind of Favor" (Live), side 2 track #7 – "The Times They Are A' Changin'" (Live) and track #8 – "If I Had My Way" (Live).500

At the Grammy Awards of 1963, their recording of "If I Had a Hammer" won the Best Folk Recording and Best Performance by a Vocal Group Grammies.

== Track listing ==
1. "Early in the Morning" (Paul Stookey) – 1:37
2. "500 Miles" (Hedy West) – 2:48
3. "Sorrow" (Traditional; arranged by Stookey and Peter Yarrow) – 2:53
4. "This Train" (Traditional; arranged by Yarrow and Stookey) – 2:11
5. "Bamboo" (Dave Van Ronk) – 2:33
6. "It's Raining" (Traditional; arranged by Stookey and Yarrow) – 4:23
7. "If I Had My Way" (Reverend Gary Davis) – 2:25
8. "Cruel War" (Yarrow, Stookey) – 2:19
9. "Lemon Tree" (Will Holt) – 2:57
10. "If I Had a Hammer" (Pete Seeger, Lee Hays) – 2:10
11. "Autumn to May" (Yarrow, Stookey) – 2:46
12. "Where Have All the Flowers Gone?" (Seeger) – 3:55

== Personnel ==
Peter, Paul, and Mary

- Peter Yarrow – guitar, vocals
- Paul Stookey – guitar, vocals
- Mary Travers – vocals
- Bruce Langhorne – guitar

Additional personnel

- Bernard Cole – cover photography at The Bitter End, New York City
- Milton Glaser – cover design
- Albert Grossman – producer
- Milton Okun – musical director
- Bill Schwartau – recording engineer

== Chart positions ==
=== Weekly charts ===
Weekly chart performance for Peter, Paul and Mary
Year	Chart	Position
1962	Billboard Pop Albums (Billboard 200)	1
1963	Billboard Pop Albums (Billboard 200)	1

=== Monthly charts ===
Monthly chart performance for Peter, Paul and Mary
Chart (2026)	Peak position
German Jazz Albums (Offizielle Top 100)	6
