= I Dig Rock and Roll Music =

Single by Peter, Paul and Mary

from the album Album 1700
- B-side: "The Great Mandella (The Wheel of Life)"
- Released: August 1967
- Genre: Folk rock; psychedelic folk
- Length: 2:31
- Label: Warner Bros.
- Songwriters: Paul Stookey; James Mason; Dave Dixon
- Producers: Albert Grossman; Milt Okun

Peter, Paul and Mary singles chronology
"For Baby (For Bobbie)" (1966)	"I Dig Rock and Roll Music" (1967)	"Too Much of Nothing" (1967)

"I Dig Rock and Roll Music" is a 1967 song by the American folk group Peter, Paul and Mary, written by Paul Stookey, James Mason and Dave Dixon.

== Background ==
Credited to Stookey-Mason-Dixon, the song's lyrics reference contemporary rock artists including the Mamas & the Papas, Donovan, and the Beatles. The song parodies and satirizes the vocal style of the Mamas & the Papas in the first verse, Donovan in the second verse and the Beatles in the third verse.

As Jim Melloan wrote in amNewYork, the song is "depending on your perspective, either a gentle or bitter tweaking of the ascendant rock genre — which in the past three years had left folkies like Peter, Paul, and Mary in the dust — and a genuine celebration of that genre. Kind of a neat trick." For his part, co-writer Noel Paul Stookey apologized years later for having insulted the Beatles in the song. “When you write songs, you sometimes get overwhelmed by the desire to rhyme something rather than to say what it is you mean,” he told Rolling Stone. “I was young and impatient when I wrote ‘I Dig Rock and Roll Music,’ and the verse that says, ‘And when the Beatles tell you they got a word love to sell you, they mean exactly what they say,’ I never meant to demean their motives.”

In an interview with the Chicago Daily News in 1966, a year before the song's release, Mary Travers expressed contempt for the emergence of the folk rock genre: "(It's) so badly written. ... When the fad changed from folk to rock, they didn't take along any good writers."

The line "When the words don't get in the way, yeah" and especially the phrasing of "yeah" is a reference to the line "Every other day, every other day, every other day of the week is fine, yeah" from the Mamas & the Papas' song "Monday, Monday".

The line about Donovan and "his crystal images" refers to the mention of "crystal spectacles" in "Epistle to Dippy". The song is also noted for its psychedelic feedback effects, miming the volume swell on the electric guitar from Donovan's 1966 song "Sunshine Superman". The backing vocal effect in the verse parodying the Beatles reflects "Yellow Submarine". The backing band on the recording was The Paupers, a rock band from Toronto.

Cash Box said the song is "a rollicking trip with a sense of humor."

== Chart history ==
The song was a hit single for the group and reached No. 9 on the Billboard Hot 100. In Australia, the song reached No. 4.

=== Weekly charts ===
Chart (1967)	Peak position
Australia (Kent Music Report)	4
Canada RPM Top Singles	27
New Zealand (Listener)	9
US Billboard Hot 100	9
US Cash Box Top 100	11

=== Year-end charts ===
Chart (1967)	Rank
US Billboard Hot 100	91
