= Late Again (album) =

Studio album by Peter, Paul & Mary
- Released: August 1968
- Recorded: 1968
- Genre: Folk, pop
- Length: 37:05
- Label: Warner Bros.-Seven Arts
- Producer: Albert Grossman, Milt Okun

Peter, Paul & Mary chronology
Album 1700 (1967)	Late Again (1968)	Peter, Paul and Mommy (1969)

Professional ratings
Review scores
Source	Rating
Allmusic	2.5/5 stars

Late Again is the eighth studio album by folk trio, Peter, Paul and Mary and reached #14 on Billboard's Top 200 Albums Chart.

The same week that this album was released, group members Mary Travers and Peter Yarrow were part of an anti-war demonstration in Grant Park during the late August Democratic National Convention in Chicago, IL. The two were among demonstrators who were beaten and teargassed; this made newsreels across the country.

Late Again featured one Billboard Magazine Hot 100 single, "Too Much of Nothing" which was written by Bob Dylan. This album continued the group's transitioning sound, continuing to build a slight "Beatles-influenced" edge into their recordings.

== Track listing ==
No.	Title	Writer(s)	Length
1.	"Apologize"	Noel Stookey	2:51
2.	"Moments of Soft Persuasion"	Peter Yarrow	2:31
3.	"Yesterday's Tomorrow"	Bob Dorough; Laura Popper; Mary Travers	3:30
4.	"Too Much of Nothing"	Bob Dylan	2:32
5.	"There's Anger in the Land"	Hedy West; Don West	3:42
6.	"Love City (Postcards to Duluth)"	Noel Stookey	3:39
7.	"She Dreams"	Milt Okun; Noel Stookey; Mary Travers; Peter Yarrow	2:52
8.	"Hymn"	Karen Gold; James Mason; Noel Stookey	2:19
9.	"Tramp on the Street"	Grady Cole; Hazel Cole	3:49
10.	"I Shall Be Released"	Bob Dylan	2:36
11.	"Reason to Believe"	Tim Hardin	2:10
12.	"Rich Man, Poor Man"	Peter Yarrow; Peter Zimmel	3:35

== Musicians ==
- Daniel Armstrong - Guitar, Bass
- Robert Banks - Keyboards
- Gene Bertoncini - Guitar
- Maurice Bialkin - Cello
- Elvin Bishop - Guitar
- Richard Bock - Cello
- Monte Dunn - Guitar
- Paul Griffin - Keyboards
- Herbert "Herbie" Hancock - Piano
- Ernest Hayes - Keyboards
- Herb Lovelle - Drums
- Lou Mauro - Bass
- Charlie McCoy - Harmonica
- Charles McCracken - Cello, Violin
- Wayne Moss - Guitar
- Ronald Prokop - Drums
- Bernard Purdie - Drums
- Hargus Robbins - Piano
- Margaret Ross - Harp
- Russ Savakus - Wood Bass
- John Simon - Piano, Arranger
- Marvin Stamm - Trumpet, Cornet
- Luther Tucker - Guitar
- Paul Winter - Saxophone
- Albertine Robinson - Backing Vocals
- Maretha Stewart - Backing Vocals
- Toni Wine - Backing Vocals

== Sources ==
- Track listing- PP&M Official Site "Late Again" Page
