= See What Tomorrow Brings =

Studio album by Peter, Paul & Mary
- Released: 1965
- Studio: Bell Sound (New York City)
- Genre: Folk
- Length: 33:27
- Label: Warner Bros.
- Producer: Albert Grossman; Milt Okun (musical director)

Peter, Paul & Mary chronology
A Song Will Rise (1965)	See What Tomorrow Brings (1965)	The Peter, Paul and Mary Album (1966)

Professional ratings
Review scores
Source	Rating
Allmusic	3/5 stars

See What Tomorrow Brings is the fifth studio album by the American folk music trio Peter, Paul & Mary, released in 1965 (see 1965 in music).

== Track listing ==
1. "If I Were Free" (Travis Edmonson) - 2:43
2. "Betty & Dupree" (Adapted and arranged by Peter Yarrow, Noel Paul Stookey, Mary Travers, Milton Okun) - 3:13
3. "The Rising of the Moon" (John Keegan "Leo" Casey Adapted and arranged by Peter Yarrow, Noel Paul Stookey, Mary Travers, Milton Okun) - 3:36
4. "Early Mornin' Rain" - (Gordon Lightfoot) - 3:13
5. "Jane, Jane" - (Adapted and arranged by Peter Yarrow, Noel Paul Stookey, Mary Travers, Milton Okun) - 2:57
6. "Because All Men Are Brothers" (Johann Sebastian Bach, Tom Glazer) - 2:17
7. "Hangman" - (Adapted and arranged by Peter Yarrow, Joel Hendler, Noel Paul Stookey, Mary Travers, Milton Okun) - 2:51
8. "Brother, (Buddy) Can You Spare a Dime?" (Jay Gorney, E.Y. "Yip" Harburg) - 2:29
9. "The First Time Ever I Saw Your Face" (Ewan MacColl) - 3:06
10. "Tryin' to Win" (Brownie McGhee, Sonny Terry) - 2:33
11. "On a Desert Island (With You in My Dreams)" (Noel Paul Stookey, Richard Kniss) - 1:46
12. "The Last Thing on My Mind" (Tom Paxton) - 2:43

== Personnel ==
- Peter Yarrow – vocals, guitar
- Noel Paul Stookey – vocals, guitar
- Mary Travers – vocals

Technical

- Harry Yarmack – recording engineer
- Barry Feinstein – photography

== Chart positions ==
Year	Chart	Position
1965	Billboard Pop Albums	11
