= A Song Will Rise =

Studio album by Peter, Paul & Mary
- Released: 1965
- Genre: Folk
- Length: 36:38
- Label: Warner Bros.
- Producer: Albert Grossman; Milton Okun (musical director)

Peter, Paul & Mary chronology
In Concert (1964)	A Song Will Rise (1965)	See What Tomorrow Brings (1965)

Singles from A Song Will Rise
- 1. "For Lovin' Me" Released: December 1964; 2. "When the Ship Comes In" Released: April 1965; 3. "The San Francisco Bay Blues" Released: 1965

Professional ratings
Review scores
Source	Rating
Allmusic	3/5 stars
Record Mirror	(Pye re-issue)

A Song Will Rise is the fourth studio album by the American folk music trio Peter, Paul & Mary, released in 1965.

== Track listing ==
Unless otherwise indicated, all tracks are composed by Noel Paul Stookey, Mary Travers, Peter Yarrow and Milt Okun.

No.	Title	Writer(s)	Length
1.	"When the Ship Comes In"	Bob Dylan	2:37
2.	"Jimmy Whalen"		2:38
3.	"Come and Go with Me"		3:03
4.	"Gilgarra Mountain"	Traditional; arranged by Peter Yarrow	6:00
5.	"Ballad of Spring Hill (Spring Hill Disaster)"	Ewan MacColl; Peggy Seeger
6.	"Motherless Child"	Traditional; arranged by Milton Okun · Mary Travers	3:37
7.	"Wasn't That a Time"	W. S. Gilbert; Lee Hays; Peggy Seeger	2:22
8.	"Monday Morning"		3:14
9.	"The Cuckoo"	Dwain Clay Story; Erik Jacobsen; Milt Okun; Noel Paul Stookey; Mary Travers; Peter Yarrow	2:17
10.	"San Francisco Bay Blues"	Jesse Fuller	2:58
11.	"Talkin' Candy Bar Blues"	Noel Paul Stookey	2:32
12.	"For Lovin' Me"	Gordon Lightfoot	2:08
Total length:			36:38

== Personnel ==
- Peter Yarrow – vocals, guitar
- Noel Paul Stookey – vocals, guitar
- Mary Travers – vocals
- Bruce Langhorne – guitar

== Chart positions ==
Year	Chart	Position
1965	Billboard Pop albums	8
