= In the Wind =

Studio album by Peter, Paul and Mary
- Released: October 1963
- Recorded: 1963
- Genre: Folk
- Length: 37:22
- Label: Warner Bros.
- Producer: Albert Grossman; Milt Okun (musical director)

Peter, Paul and Mary chronology
| Moving (1963) | In the Wind (1963) | In Concert (1964) |

Singles from In the Wind
- 1. "Blowin' in the Wind" Released: 18 June 1963; 2. "Don't Think Twice, It's All Right" Released: 28 August 1963; 3. "Stewball" Released: November 1963

Professional ratings
Review scores
| Source | Rating |
|---|---|
| AllMusic | 3/5 stars |
| Record Mirror | 4/5 stars |

In the Wind is the third album by the American folk music trio Peter, Paul and Mary, released in October 1963, a few months before the arrival of the Beatles heralded the British Invasion. It was reissued on audio CD in 1990.

The lead-off single of Bob Dylan's "Blowin' in the Wind" sold 300,000 copies in the first week of release. On July 13, 1963, it reached number two on the Billboard pop chart, with sales exceeding one million copies. It spent five weeks atop the easy listening chart. The second single from the album, "Don't Think Twice, It's All Right", another song by Dylan, peaked at number 2 on the Adult Contemporary chart and number 9 on the Pop Singles chart.

At the Grammy Awards of 1964, their recording of "Blowin' in the Wind" won the Best Folk Recording and Best Performance by a Vocal Group.

== Track listing ==
1. "Very Last Day" (Peter Yarrow, Noel Stookey) – 2:33
2. "Hush-a-Bye" (Traditional; arranged by Peter Yarrow and Noel Stookey) – 2:23
3. "Long Chain On" (Jimmy Driftwood) – 4:38
4. "Rocky Road" (Peter Yarrow, Noel Stookey) – 3:42
5. "Tell It on the Mountain" (arranged by Mary Travers, Peter Yarrow, Milton Okun, Noel Stookey) – 2:58
6. "Polly Von" a.k.a. Polly Vaughn and Molly Bawn (Mary Travers, Peter Yarrow, Noel Stookey) – 4:10
7. "Stewball" (Traditional; arranged by Mary Travers, Milton Okun, Noel Stookey and Elena Mezzetti) – 3:12
8. "All My Trials" (Traditional; arranged by Peter Yarrow, Paul Stookey and Milton Okun) – 3:19
9. "Don't Think Twice, It's All Right" (Bob Dylan) – 3:16
10. "Freight Train" (Elizabeth Cotten) – 2:47
11. "Quit Your Low Down Ways" (Bob Dylan) – 2:07
12. "Blowin' in the Wind" (Bob Dylan) – 2:57

== Personnel ==
- Peter Yarrow – vocals, guitar
- Noel "Paul" Stookey – vocals, guitar
- Mary Travers – vocals

Additional personnel

- Edgar O. DeHaas – standup bass
- Bob Dylan – liner notes
- Barry Feinstein – cover photography
- Bill Schwartau – recording engineer

== Chart history ==
Chart performance for In the Wind
| Year | Chart | Peak position |
|---|---|---|
| 1963 | Billboard Top LPs | 1 |

== Certification ==
| Region | Certification | Certified units/sales |
|---|---|---|
| United States (RIAA) | Gold | 500,000^{^} |
^{^} Shipments figures based on certification alone.
