= Album 1700 =

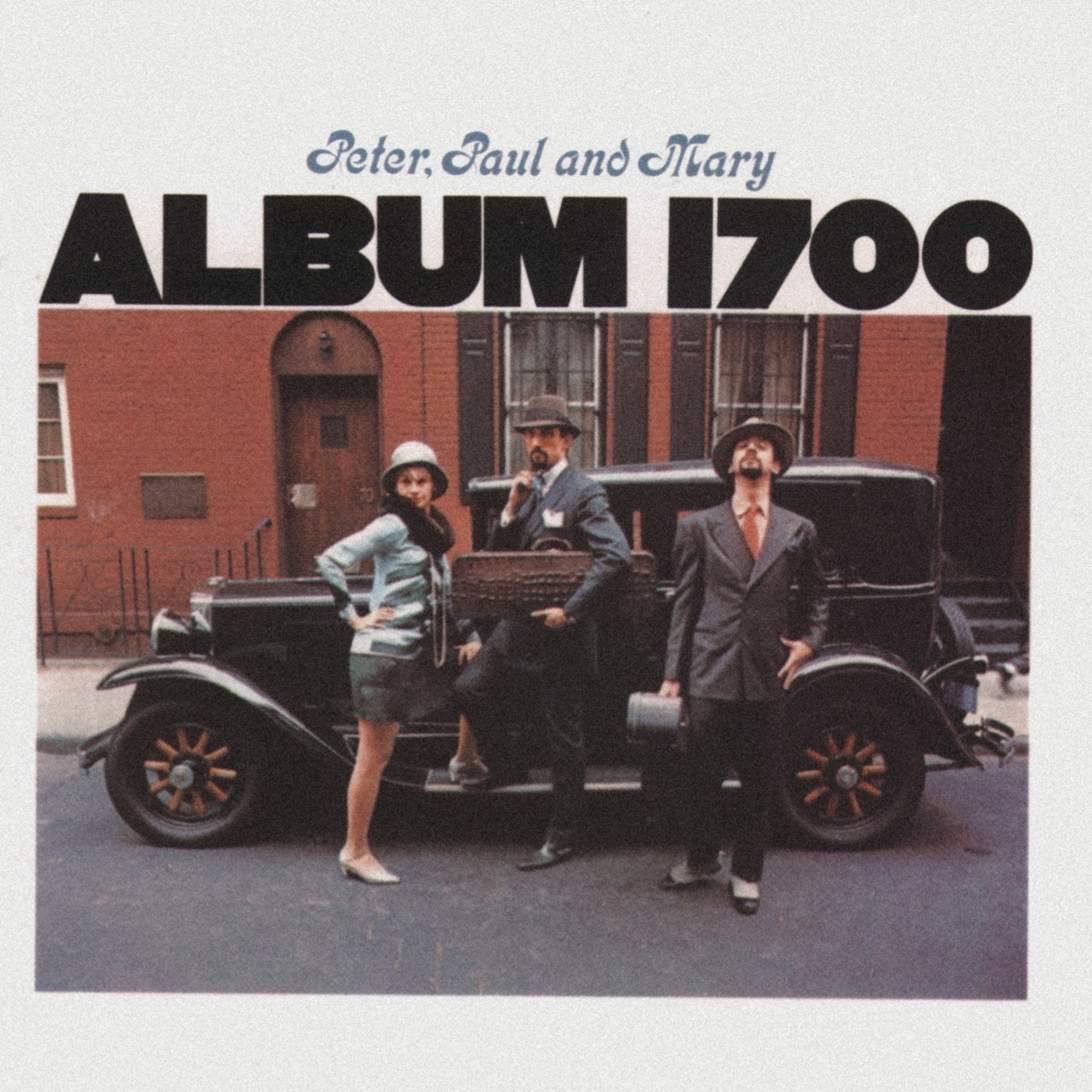

Studio album by Peter, Paul & Mary
- Released: August 4, 1967
- Recorded: 1966–1967
- Studios: A&R Studios, New York City
- Genres: Folk; pop
- Length: 39:44
- Label: Warner Bros.
- Producers: Albert Grossman; Milt Okun

Peter, Paul & Mary chronology
The Peter, Paul and Mary Album (1966)	Album 1700 (1967)	Late Again (1968)

Singles from Album 1700
- 1. "I Dig Rock and Roll Music" Released: August 1967; 2. "Leaving on a Jet Plane" Released: October 1969

Professional ratings
Review scores
Source	Rating
Allmusic	2.5/5 stars

Album 1700 is the seventh studio album by American folk music trio Peter, Paul and Mary, released in 1967. It produced the band's most successful and final hit, a recording of the John Denver song "Leaving on a Jet Plane". The album peaked at number 15 on Billboard magazine's Top LP chart and was nominated for a Grammy Award in the Best Folk Performance category. Album 1700 was so named because its original LP issue was Warner Bros. Records catalog number W-1700 for the mono version and WS-1700 for the stereo version. It stayed on the charts and rose again in 1969, thanks to the single release of "Leaving on a Jet Plane".

The song "I'm in Love with a Big Blue Frog" was written by Leslie Braunstein, who was the original lead singer of Soft White Underbelly, the band that became Blue Öyster Cult. The song was later adapted into a children's book and recorded by Will Ryan and Phil Baron for the Disney children's album Goin' Quackers.

== Cover art ==
The cover is styled after one of the promotional photographs for the movie Bonnie and Clyde that showed the gang holding machine guns. It was taken at 70 Bedford Street, Greenwich Village, New York City.

== Track listing ==
1. "Rolling Home" (Eric Andersen) – 3:31
2. "Leaving on a Jet Plane" (John Denver) – 3:30
3. "Weep for Jamie" (Peter Yarrow)– 4:12
4. "No Other Name" (Paul Stookey) – 2:31
5. "The House Song" (Stookey, Robert Bannard) – 4:18
6. "The Great Mandella (The Wheel of Life)" (Peter Yarrow) – 4:45
7. "I Dig Rock and Roll Music" (Stookey, James Mason, Dave Dixon) – 2:33
8. "If I Had Wings" (Yarrow, Susan Yardley) – 2:22
9. "I'm in Love with a Big Blue Frog" (Leslie Braunstein) – 2:08
10. "Whatshername" (Stookey, Dixon, Richard Kniss) – 3:27
11. "Bob Dylan's Dream" (Bob Dylan) – 4:01
12. "The Song Is Love" (Dixon, Kniss, Stookey, Yarrow, Mary Travers) – 2:44

== Personnel ==
Peter, Paul & Mary

- Peter Yarrow – vocals; solo vocal on "If I Had Wings"; guitar; 12-string guitar on "Leaving on a Jet Plane" and "Weep for Jamie"
- Noel "Paul" Stookey – vocals; solo vocal on "Whatshername"; guitar; 12-string guitar on "Rolling Home", "The House Song" and "The Song Is Love"
- Mary Travers – vocals; solo vocal on "No Other Name"

with:

- Howard Collins - guitar
- Paul Griffin - organ on "Weep for Jamie"
- Morris Wechslier - piano
- Harvey Brooks - bass
- Richard Kniss - wood bass solo on "Whatshername"
- Russ Savakus - bass
- Paul Butterfield - harmonica on "Rolling Home"
- Chuck Beale (The Paupers) - guitar
- Adam Mitchell (The Paupers) - guitar
- Denny Gerrard (The Paupers) - bass
- Skip Prokop (The Paupers) - drums
- Gene Bertoncini (Paul Winter Consort) - guitar on "The House Song"
- Karl Herreshoff (Paul Winter Consort) - guitar on "The House Song"
- John Beal (Paul Winter Consort) - bass on "The House Song"
- Gene Murrow (Paul Winter Consort) - English horn on "The House Song"
- Paul Winter (Paul Winter Consort) - saxophone on "The House Song"
- Virgil Scott (Paul Winter Consort) - alto flute on "The House Song"
- Richard Bock (Paul Winter Consort) - cello on "The House Song"

=== Production notes ===
- Milton Okun – producer
- Phil Ramone – engineer
- Don Hahn – associate engineer

== Chart positions ==
Year	Chart	Position
1967	Billboard Pop Albums	15
