= Too Much of Nothing =

1975 song by Bob Dylan and the Band

Song by Bob Dylan & the Band

from the album The Basement Tapes
- Released: June 1975
- Length: 3:04
- Label: Columbia
- Songwriter(s): Bob Dylan
- Producer(s): Bob Dylan; The Band

"Too Much of Nothing" is a song written by Bob Dylan in 1967, first recorded by him on the album The Basement Tapes, with Dylan's recording remaining unreleased until 1975.

== Themes and history of song ==
One of the most haunting themes of The Basement Tapes is an apprehension of the void. Biographer Robert Shelton hears in this song an echo of the bald statement that Shakespeare's Lear makes to his daughter Cordelia, "Nothing will come of nothing" (King Lear, Act I, Scene 1). Greil Marcus asserts that this was one of the songs recorded at the end of "the basement summer" in August or September 1967. He writes that these songs "are taken slowly, with crying voices. Dylan’s voice is high and constantly bending, carried forward not by rhythm or by melody but by the discovery of the true terrain of the songs as they’re sung. Richard Manuel’s and Rick Danko’s voices are higher still, more exposed."

In a 2014 interview promoting the release of The Bootleg Series Vol. 11: The Basement Tapes Complete, Dylan cited the riots during the long, hot summer of 1967, including the riots in Rochester, as an impetus for the song.

== Cover versions ==
"Too Much of Nothing"

Single by Peter, Paul and Mary

from the album Late Again
- B-side: "The House Song"
- Released: November 1967
- Label: Warner Bros.
- Songwriter(s): Bob Dylan
- Producer(s): Albert Grossman, Milton Okun

By November 1967, this song was a Top 40 hit for Peter, Paul and Mary. According to Billboard, this version's "clever driving blues arrangement compliments the trio to the fullest." Cash Box said that it is "blues in a folk manner with plenty of funk." Record World described it as "philosophy with a gritty beat." In Dylan's original, the chorus addresses two ladies—"Say hello to Valerie/Say hello to Vivien/Send them all my salary/On the waters of oblivion"—but Peter, Paul and Mary changed the second name to "Marion," displeasing Dylan. The trio's Paul Stookey speculated that this mistake may have caused Dylan to consequently become disenchanted with the group: "We just became other hacks that were doing his tunes." Patrick Humphries notes that, whether by accident or design, the chorus's two women originally named share the names of the two wives of the major 20th-century poet T. S. Eliot. (Note: Eliot married Vivienne Haigh-Wood in 1915; they separated in 1933. Critics consider their marriage central to his writing The Waste Land (Gordon 2000, pp. 147–192). Eliot married Valerie Fletcher in January 1957, near the end of his life (Gordon 2000, pp. 496–536).) Lachlan MacKinnon writes that the lines do refer to Eliot's wives and are "remarkably shrewd", suggesting the poet's "strange combination of self-distancing and financial propriety". Peter, Paul and Mary's recording of the song was also included on their 1968 album Late Again.

This song also appeared on Spooky Tooth's debut album It's All About, and on Fotheringay's debut album, as well as Albert Lee's Black Claw & Country Fever sessions. All three versions substituted "Marion" for "Vivien".

== Personnel ==
- Bob Dylan – vocal, guitar
- Robbie Robertson – electric guitar
- Garth Hudson – organ
- Richard Manuel – piano, backing vocal
- Rick Danko – bass, backing vocal.

Overdubbed 1975:

- Hudson – additional keyboards
- Helm – (possibly) drums, backing vocal

== Bibliography ==
- Gilliland, John (1969). "Hail, Hail, Rock 'n' Roll: Getting back to rock's funky, essential essence" (audio). Pop Chronicles. University of North Texas Libraries.
- Gordon, Lyndall (2000). T. S. Eliot: An Imperfect Life. Norton. ISBN 0-393-32093-6.
- Humphries, Patrick (1991). Oh No! Not Another Bob Dylan Book. Square One Books. ISBN 1-872747-04-3.
- Marcus, Greil (1975). The Basement Tapes (CD booklet). New York: Columbia Records.
- Marcus, Greil (1997). Invisible Republic: Bob Dylan's Basement Tapes. Picador. ISBN 0-330-33624-X.
- Shelton, Robert (1986). No Direction Home: The Life and Music of Bob Dylan (hardback ed.). New English Library. ISBN 0-450-04843-8.
- Sounes, Howard (2001). Down the Highway: The Life of Bob Dylan. Grove Press. ISBN 0-8021-1686-8.
