= Day Is Done (song) =

Single by Peter, Paul and Mary

from the album Peter, Paul and Mommy
- B-side: "Make Believe Town"
- Released: March 24, 1969
- Genre: Folk; pop
- Length: 3:16
- Label: Warner Bros.-Seven Arts
- Songwriter: Peter Yarrow

Peter, Paul and Mary singles chronology
"Love City (Postcard from Duluth)" (1968)	"Day Is Done" (1969)	"Leaving on a Jet Plane" (1969)

"Day Is Done" is a song written by Peter Yarrow. It was recorded by Yarrow's group Peter, Paul and Mary and released as a single in 1969. An anti-war protest song of the Vietnam War era, the song reached No. 21 on Billboard Hot 100, and was ranked No. 48 on the Billboard year-end Top Easy Listening Singles chart of 1969.

== Background ==
"Day Is Done" was written by Peter Yarrow in 1968, and it was the last single that Peter, Paul and Mary recorded together as a group (the trio's version of "Leaving on a Jet Plane", released as a single in 1969, appeared on their Album 1700, released in 1967).

The song was written as an anti-war song during the Vietnam War era. According to Yarrow, it was written from the perspective of his younger brother who faced the possibility of getting drafted into the army. Yarrow performed it as the opening song at a concert during the anti-war march he helped organize in Washington in November 1969. It became one of the best-known protest songs of the era. Yarrow said that the message of the song is that "children will lead us to a better world".

The single version of the song was recorded live at Carnegie Hall, and an orchestra was then arranged and overdubbed at A&T Studios by Chris Dedrick. The studio version features a children choir from the nursery school of the Westchester Ethical Society and this version was used for the album Peter, Paul and Mommy, released in May.

On Peter, Paul and Mommy, the second half of the second repeat in the song's refrain was cut out. The error was corrected on the compilation album Around the Campfire by copying the second half of the first repeat.

Yarrow later released a children's book based on the lyrics of the song as part of his Songbook Series. It contains a three-song CD with a version of the song he recorded with his daughter Bethany.

== Reception ==
The song was released at the end of March 1969, and reached No. 21 on Billboard Hot 100 for chart dated June 21, 1969. Cash Box said that its "live feeling and teen-oriented lyric" gave the song solid sales potential.

The song was nominated at the 12th Annual Grammy Awards in 1970 in the category of Best Folk Performance won by Joni Mitchell's Clouds.

== Charts ==
Chart (1969)	Peak position
Canada Adult Contemporary (RPM)	5
Canada Top Singles (RPM)	17
US Adult Contemporary (Billboard)	7
US Billboard Hot 100	21
US Cash Box Top 100	20

== Cover versions ==
A French translation of the song titled "Mon Enfant" was written by Boris Bergman and recorded by Nana Mouskouri for her 1969 album, Dans le soleil et dans le vent. She has also covered the English version. "Mon Enfant" was released as a single in late 1969 and it charted at No. 20 in Dutch Charts and No. 17 in the Belgium (Ultratop Wallonia) chart in early 1970.

Johnny Maestro & The Brooklyn Bridge covered the song in 1970. Their cover peaked at No. 98 on the Billboard Hot 100.

Agnes Chan covered the song on her 1971 debut album, Will the Circle Game Be Unbroken?
