= Leaving on a Jet Plane =

1966 song by John Denver

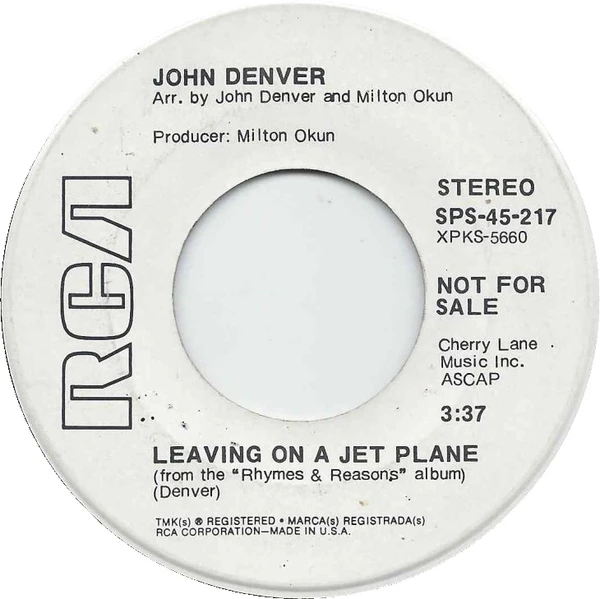

Single by John Denver

from the album Rhymes & Reasons
- B-side: "Jimmy Newman"
- Released: October 1969
- Recorded: 1966
- Genre: Folk
- Length: 3:37
- Label: RCA
- Songwriter: John Denver
- Producer: Milton Okun

John Denver singles chronology
"Daydream" (1969)	"Leaving on a Jet Plane" (1969)	"Anthem-Revelation" (1970)

"Leaving on a Jet Plane" is a song written and recorded by American singer John Denver in 1966, originally included on his debut demo recording John Denver Sings. Its original title was "Babe I Hate to Go". He made several copies and gave them out as presents for Christmas of that year. Denver's then-producer Milt Okun convinced him to change the title; it was renamed "Leaving on a Jet Plane" in 1967.

In 1969, folk group Peter, Paul and Mary's version hit number one on the Billboard Hot 100, their most successful single. It also reached number one in Canada and number two in the United Kingdom.

That same year, Denver recorded the song again for his debut studio album, Rhymes & Reasons, and it was released as a single in October 1969 through RCA Records. Although it is one of John Denver's best-known songs, his single failed to chart.

"Leaving on a Jet Plane" was re-recorded for the third and final time in 1973 for John Denver's Greatest Hits, the version that also appears on most of his compilation albums. A version by Chantal Kreviazuk reached No. 33 in Canada in 1998.

== Background ==
John Denver, then a relatively unknown 23-year old musician in the Los Angeles folk scene, wrote the song during a layover at Washington National Airport in 1966.

In one of his BBC Radio specials, Denver said about the song:

This is a very personal and very special song for me. It doesn't conjure up Boeing 707s or 747s for me as much as it does the simple scenes of leaving. Bags packed and standing by the front door, taxi pulling up in the early morning hours, the sound of a door closing behind you, and the thought of leaving someone that you care for very much. I was fortunate to have Peter, Paul and Mary record it and have it become a hit, but it still strikes a lonely and anguished chord in me, because the separation still continues, although not so long and not so often nowadays.

Though not written about the Vietnam War, the Peter, Paul and Mary cover of the song was interpreted by at least one writer to be a protest song about a soldier's impending deployment.

== Certifications ==
Region	Certification	Certified units/sales
New Zealand (RMNZ)	Gold	15,000^{‡}
United Kingdom (BPI)	Silver	200,000^{‡}
^{‡} Sales+streaming figures based on certification alone.

== Peter, Paul and Mary version ==
"Leaving on a Jet Plane"

Single by Peter, Paul and Mary

from the album Album 1700
- B-side: "The House Song"
- Released: September 1969
- Genre: Folk
- Length: 3:27
- Label: Warner Bros.- Seven Arts 7340
- Songwriter: John Denver
- Producer: Milt Okun

Peter, Paul and Mary singles chronology
"Day Is Done" (1969)	"Leaving on a Jet Plane" (1969)	"The Marvelous Toy" (1969)

Official audio
- "Leaving on a Jet Plane" (2004 Remaster) on YouTube

The most well known version was recorded by American folk group Peter, Paul and Mary, for their 1967 studio album, Album 1700, and Warner Bros.- Seven Arts released it as a single in 1969 after being one of four songs on a promo EP in 1967. John Denver was a close friend of theirs and they shared the same producer in that time, Milt Okun.

It was Peter, Paul and Mary's biggest (and final) hit, becoming their only No. 1 on the Billboard Hot 100 in the United States. It was the penultimate #1 single of the 1960s, and the song also spent three weeks atop the easy listening chart and was used in commercials for United Airlines in the late 1960s and early 1970s. The song also topped the charts in Canada, and reached No. 2 in both the UK and Ireland in February 1970. In fact, it was the only version of the song that charted.

Cash Box described this version as "stunning material" with "an especially fine arrangement."

=== Charts ===
==== Weekly charts ====
Chart (1969–70)	Peak position
Australia KMR	30
Canada RPM Top Singles	1
Canada RPM Adult Contemporary	1
Ireland (IRMA)	2
South Africa (Springbok Radio)	6
UK	2
US Billboard Hot 100	1
US Easy Listening (Billboard)	1
US Cash Box Top 100	1

==== Year-end charts ====
Chart (1969)	Rank
Canada (RPM Magazine)	51
US (Joel Whitburn's Pop Annual)	13
US Adult Contemporary (Billboard)	50

Chart (1970)	Rank
Canada	71

==== All-time charts ====
Chart (1958–2018)	Position
US Billboard Hot 100	565

== Lawsuit ==
In the 1980s, the song prompted litigation involving the British group New Order. The band's single "Run 2" (1989) was the subject of a lawsuit brought by Denver, who argued that its wordless guitar break was based on his "Leaving on a Jet Plane". The case was settled out of court, and Denver subsequently received a co-writer credit for the song.
