= If I Had a Hammer =

1949 song by Pete Seeger and Lee Hays

"The Hammer Song"
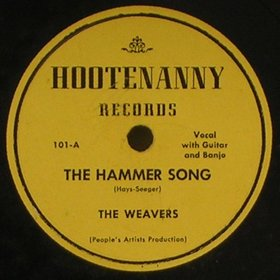
- Original 1950 release by The Weavers on Hootenanny Records, 101-A.

Single by The Weavers
- B-side: "Banks of Marble"
- Released: 1950
- Genre: Folk
- Label: Hootenanny
- Songwriters: Pete Seeger; Lee Hays

"If I Had a Hammer"
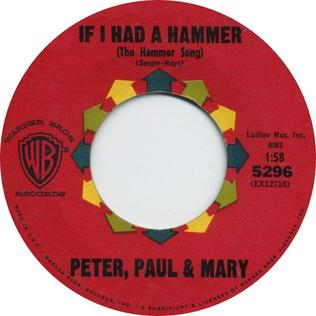
- Single by Peter, Paul and Mary

Single by Peter, Paul and Mary

from the album Peter, Paul and Mary
- B-side: "Gone the Rainbow"
- Released: 1962
- Genre: Folk
- Length: 2:11
- Label: Warner Bros.
- Songwriters: Pete Seeger; Lee Hays
- Producers: Albert Grossman; Milt Okun

Peter, Paul and Mary singles chronology
"Lemon Tree" (1962)	"If I Had a Hammer" (1962)	"Puff, the Magic Dragon" (1963)

"If I Had a Hammer"
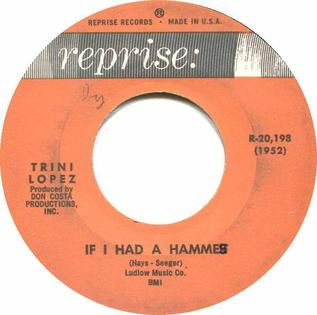
- Single by Trini Lopez

Single by Trini Lopez

from the album Trini Lopez at PJ's
- B-side: "Unchain My Heart"
- Released: July 1963
- Venue: P.J.'s
- Genre: Folk rock
- Length: 2:59
- Label: Reprise
- Songwriters: Pete Seeger; Lee Hays
- Producer: Don Costa

Trini Lopez singles chronology
"If I Had a Hammer" (1963)	"Kansas City" (1963)

"Datemi un martello"

Single by Rita Pavone
- B-side: "Che m'importa del mondo"
- Released: December 1963
- Recorded: 1963
- Genre: Pop, chanson, surf rock
- Length: 2:40
- Label: RCA Italiana
- Songwriters: Pete Seeger; Lee Hays; Sergio Bardotti
- Producer: Luis Bacalov

Rita Pavone singles chronology
"Cuore" (1963)	"Datemi un martello" (1963)	"Son finite le vacanze" (1963)

"If I Had a Hammer (The Hammer Song)" is a protest song written by Pete Seeger and Lee Hays. It was written in 1949 in support of the Progressive movement, and was first recorded by the Weavers, a folk music quartet composed of Seeger, Hays, Ronnie Gilbert, and Fred Hellerman. It was a No. 10 hit for Peter, Paul and Mary in 1962 and then went to No. 3 a year later when recorded by Trini Lopez in 1963. In a May 1963 interview on Folk Music Worldwide, Paul Stookey of Peter, Paul and Mary characterized the song as "a young national anthem for the United States".

The Weavers released the song under the title "The Hammer Song" as a 78 rpm single in March 1950 on Hootenanny Records, 101-A, backed with "Banks of Marble".

== Early versions ==
The song was first publicly performed by Pete Seeger and Lee Hays on June 3, 1949, at St. Nicholas Arena in New York City at a dinner in support of prominent members of the Communist Party of the United States, including New York City Councilman Benjamin J. Davis, who were then on trial in federal court, charged with violating the Smith Act by advocating the overthrow of the U.S. government. Four months later, it was one of three songs Seeger played as the warm-up act for Paul Robeson's September 4 concert near Peekskill, New York, attended by Davis, which subsequently erupted into the notorious, anti-Communist Peekskill Riot. In 1950 Seeger and Irwin Silber featured a copy of the sheet music of "The Hammer Song" for the cover of Sing Out!, their new magazine (the successor to People's Songs and the People's Songs Bulletin), whose title was taken from the song's chorus. Due to the Red Scare and subsequent blacklists, the song when first released did not receive wide exposure outside of activist circles.

== Hit versions ==
It fared notably better commercially when it was recorded by Peter, Paul and Mary 12 years later. Their version of the song, released in July 1962 from the group's debut album became a top 10 hit, and won the Grammy Awards for Best Folk Recording and Best Performance by a Vocal Group. It reached number 17 in Canada. Trini Lopez's 1963 single went to number three on the same Billboard chart and number five in Canada. It was included on his album Trini Lopez at PJ's (Reprise R/RS 6093). Rita Pavone's Italian-language adaptation "Datemi un martello", with lyrics by Sergio Bardotti, was a major hit in Italy and also charted in South America.

== Other versions ==
- The Limeliters titled their version The Hammer Song on the 1960 album The Limeliters.
- Martha and the Vandellas performed it on their 1963 album Heat Wave.
- Ross MacManus, father of Elvis Costello, sang the song with the Joe Loss Orchestra on the Royal Variety Show in 1963.
- The Sam Cooke album Sam Cooke at the Copa (1964) contains a live version of the song.
- Leonard Nimoy covered the song in 1968. It was republished in 1993 as part of the Highly Illogical compilation, and in 1997 as part of the Spaced Out compilation. Critics derided Nimoy's version, calling it "a real lowlight". Sado-masochistic performance artist Bob Flanagan pounded nails into his scrotum while playing Nimoy's version.
- Chilean singer Victor Jara included a Spanish-language version of the song titled "El martillo" (Spanish: The Hammer) on his 1969 album Pongo en tus manos abiertas. Promoting left-wing political ideas, Jara was making a connection between U.S. civil rights concerns and the same in Chile. Later, in 1971, he covered another U.S. song: the political satire of "Little Boxes".
- Johnny Cash released the song in 1972 with his wife June Carter Cash singing harmony. The song hit number 29 on the US country chart in August 1972, and it was included on his album Any Old Wind That Blows (1973). Cash's version was more in the rock music vein, powered by two electric guitarists: Carl Perkins on lead and solo, and Bob Wootton handling rhythm.
- Wanda Jackson released the song as a single in 1969. It was included on her album The Many Moods of Wanda Jackson. It reached number 41 on the US country chart in April 1969.
- French singer Claude François released a version in a single in 1963. It was translated and adaptated by Vline Buggy. This version does not contain the protest dimension of the original song. On the contrary, it values the idea of family and work. In this context, the bell evokes the church and places the song in a conservative French tradition. It reached number 1 on the French country chart in 1963, and number 2 in Belgium (WA).
- Bruce Springsteen recorded an unrehearsed version of the song with a star-studded group in 2004, but the track was left out of the resulting album We Shall Overcome: The Seeger Sessions (2006) because Springsteen was concerned that the song's fame would upstage the lesser-known songs on the album. The album was successful, attracting more fans to Seeger's music. In 2018, Springsteen's Seeger Sessions version of "Hammer" was released in a compilation album titled Appleseed's 21st Anniversary – Roots And Branches.

== Charts ==
Peter, Paul and Mary
Chart (1962)	Peak position
Canada CHUM Chart	17
US Billboard Hot 100	10
US Cashbox Top 100	13

Trini Lopez
Chart (1963–1964)	Peak position
Argentina	1
Australia (Kent Music Report)	2
Belgium (Ultratop 50 Flanders)	1
Belgium (Ultratop 50 Wallonia)	1
Canada (CHUM Chart)	5
Denmark (Hitlisten)	1
Finland (Suomen virallinen lista)	16
France (IFOP)	3
France (Cash Box)	1
Ireland	3
Israel (Kol Yisrael)	1
Italy (Musica e dischi)	10
Mexico (AMPROFON)	1
Netherlands (Single Top 100)	1
New Zealand (Lever Hit Parade)	2
Norway (VG-lista)	2
Peru	1
South Africa	3
Spain (AFYVE)	1
Sweden (Kvällstoppen)	1
Sweden (Tio i Topp)	1
Switzerland (Musikmarkt)	2
UK Singles (Official Charts)	4
Uruguay	4
US Billboard Hot 100	3
US Billboard Hot R&B Singles	12
Venezuela	8
West Germany (GfK)	2

Rita Pavone
Chart (1964)	Peak position
Argentina (CAPIF)	3
Brazil (IBOPE)	1
Uruguay	5
