= Blowin' in the Wind =

1963 single by Bob Dylan

Single by Bob Dylan

from the album The Freewheelin' Bob Dylan
- B-side: "Don't Think Twice, It's All Right"
- Released: August 13, 1963
- Recorded: July 9, 1962
- Studio: Columbia Recording, New York City
- Genre: Folk; protest music
- Length: 2:48
- Label: Columbia
- Songwriter: Bob Dylan
- Producer: John H. Hammond

Bob Dylan singles chronology
| "Mixed-Up Confusion" (1962) | "Blowin' in the Wind" (1963) | "The Times They Are a-Changin'" (1967) |

Audio sample
- file; help

"Blowin' in the Wind" is a song written by Bob Dylan in 1962. It was released as a single and included on his album The Freewheelin' Bob Dylan in 1963. It has been described as a protest song and poses a series of rhetorical questions about peace, war, and freedom. The refrain "The answer, my friend, is blowin' in the wind" has been described as "impenetrably ambiguous: either the answer is so obvious it is right in your face, or the answer is as intangible as the wind".

In 1994, the song was inducted into the Grammy Hall of Fame. In 2004, it was ranked number 14 on Rolling Stone magazine's list of the "500 Greatest Songs of All Time". Despite not charting when first released as a single, it has gained much radio airplay, ultimately peaking at #3 in France on the airplay chart.

In June 1963, Peter, Paul and Mary released a cover version of "Blowin' in the Wind" three weeks after The Freewheelin' Bob Dylan was issued. It became the most commercially successful version of the song, reaching number two on the Billboard Hot 100 and was at number one on the Middle-Road charts for five weeks. At the 6th Annual Grammy Awards, this version of the song won two Grammys: Best Folk Recording and Best Performance by a Vocal Group. In 2003, Peter, Paul & Mary's version of "Blowin' in the Wind" was inducted into the Grammy Hall of Fame.

== Origins and initial response ==
Dylan originally wrote and performed a two-verse version of the song; its first public performance, at Gerde's Folk City on April 16, 1962, was recorded and circulated among Dylan collectors. Shortly after this performance, he added the middle verse to the song. Some published versions of the lyrics reverse the order of the second and third verses, apparently because Dylan simply appended the middle verse to his original manuscript, rather than writing out a new copy with the verses in proper order. The song was published for the first time in May 1962, in the sixth issue of Broadside, the magazine founded by Agnes 'Sis' Cunningham and Gordon Friesen and devoted to topical songs. The theme may have been taken from a passage in Woody Guthrie's 1943 autobiography, Bound for Glory, in which Guthrie compared his political sensibility to newspapers blowing in the winds of New York City streets and alleys. Dylan was certainly familiar with Guthrie's work; his reading of it had been a major turning point in his intellectual and political development.

In June 1962, the song was published in Sing Out! accompanied by Dylan's comments:

There ain't too much I can say about this song except that the answer is blowing in the wind. It ain't in no book or movie or TV show or discussion group. Man, it's in the wind – and it's blowing in the wind. Too many of these hip people are telling me where the answer is but oh I won't believe that. I still say it's in the wind and just like a restless piece of paper it's got to come down some ... But the only trouble is that no one picks up the answer when it comes down so not too many people get to see and know ... and then it flies away. I still say that some of the biggest criminals are those that turn their heads away when they see wrong and know it's wrong. I'm only 21 years old and I know that there's been too many wars ... You people over 21, you're older and smarter.

Dylan recorded "Blowin' in the Wind" on July 9, 1962, for inclusion on his second album, The Freewheelin' Bob Dylan, released in May, 1963.

Bobby Darin recorded "Blowin' in the Wind" on July 30, 1963, for inclusion on his album, Golden Folk Hits, also released in 1963. Arranged by Walter Raim, there was Roger McGuinn, Glen Campbell, James Burton, and Phil Ochs all on guitar, and singing harmony.

In his sleeve notes for The Bootleg Series Volumes 1–3 (Rare & Unreleased) 1961–1991, John Bauldie wrote that Pete Seeger first identified the melody of "Blowin' in the Wind" as an adaptation of the old African-American spiritual "No More Auction Block/We Shall Overcome". According to Alan Lomax's The Folk Songs of North America, the song was sung by former slaves who fled to Nova Scotia after Britain abolished slavery in 1833. In 1978, Dylan acknowledged the source when he told journalist Marc Rowland: "'Blowin' in the Wind' has always been a spiritual. I took it off a song called 'No More Auction Block' – that's a spiritual and 'Blowin' in the Wind' follows the same feeling." Dylan's performance of "No More Auction Block" was recorded at the Gaslight Cafe in October 1962, and appeared on The Bootleg Series Volumes 1–3 (Rare & Unreleased) 1961–1991.

The critic Michael Gray suggested that the lyric is an example of Dylan's "quiet incorporation of Biblical rhetoric into his own", starting with a text from the Old Testament book of Ezekiel (12:1–2): "Son of Man, thou dwellest in the midst of a rebellious house, which have eyes to see and see not; they have ears to hear and hear not." which Dylan transforms into: "Yes' n' how many times must a man turn his head / Pretending he just doesn't see?" and "Yes'n' how many ears must one man have / Before he can hear people cry?"

"Blowin' in the Wind" has been described as an anthem of the civil rights movement. In Martin Scorsese's documentary on Dylan, No Direction Home, Mavis Staples expressed her astonishment on first hearing the song and said she could not understand how a young white man could write something that captured the frustration and aspirations of black people so powerfully. Sam Cooke was similarly deeply impressed by the song, incorporating it into his repertoire soon after its release (a version would be included on Sam Cooke at the Copa), and being inspired by it to write "A Change Is Gonna Come".

"Blowin' in the Wind" was first covered by the Chad Mitchell Trio, but their record company delayed release of the album containing it because the song included the word death, so the trio lost out to Peter, Paul and Mary, who were represented by Dylan's manager, Albert Grossman. The single sold 300,000 copies in the first week of release and made the song world-famous. On August 17, 1963, it reached number two on the Billboard pop chart, with sales exceeding one million copies. Peter Yarrow recalled that, when he told Dylan he would make more than $5,000 (equivalent to $53,000 in 2025) from the publishing rights, Dylan was speechless. Peter, Paul and Mary's version of the song also spent five weeks atop the easy listening chart.

The critic Andy Gill wrote,

"Blowin' in the Wind" marked a huge jump in Dylan's songwriting. Prior to this, efforts like "The Ballad of Donald White" and "The Death of Emmett Till" had been fairly simplistic bouts of reportage songwriting. "Blowin' in the Wind" was different: for the first time, Dylan discovered the effectiveness of moving from the particular to the general. Whereas "The Ballad of Donald White" would become completely redundant as soon as the eponymous criminal was executed, a song as vague as "Blowin' in the Wind" could be applied to just about any freedom issue. It remains the song with which Dylan's name is most inextricably linked, and safeguarded his reputation as a civil libertarian through any number of changes in style and attitude.

Dylan performed the song for the first time on television in the UK in January 1963, when he appeared in the BBC television play Madhouse on Castle Street. He also performed the song during his first national US television appearance, filmed in March 1963, a performance made available in 2005 on the DVD release of Martin Scorsese's PBS television documentary on Dylan, No Direction Home.

An allegation that the song was written by a high-school student named Lorre Wyatt (a member of Millburn High School's "Millburnaires" all-male folk band) and subsequently purchased or plagiarised by Dylan before he gained fame was reported in an article in Newsweek magazine in November 1963. The plagiarism claim was eventually shown to be false.

== Legacy ==
In the 1994 film Forrest Gump, Jenny sings this song for a show in a strip club and is introduced as "Bobbi Dylan". The film's soundtrack album features Joan Baez's 1975 live recording of the song, from her 1976 album From Every Stage.

In 1975, the song was included as poetry in a high-school English textbook in Sri Lanka. The textbook caused controversy because it replaced Shakespeare's work with Dylan's.

During the protests against the Iraq War, commentators noted that protesters were resurrecting songs such as "Blowin' in the Wind" rather than creating new ones.

The song has been embraced by many liberal churches, and in the 1960s and 1970s it was sung both in Catholic church "folk masses" and as a hymn in Protestant ones. In 1997, Bob Dylan performed three other songs at a Catholic church congress. Pope John Paul II, who was in attendance, told the crowd of some 300,000 young Italian Catholics that the answer was indeed "in the wind" – not in the wind that blew things away, but rather "in the wind of the spirit" that would lead them to Christ. In 2007, Pope Benedict XVI (who had also been in attendance) wrote that he was uncomfortable with music stars such as Dylan performing in a church environment. The Westboro Baptist Church has parodied the song.

In 2009, Dylan licensed the song to be used in an advertisement for the British consumer-owned Co-operative Group. The Co-op claimed that Dylan's decision was influenced by "the Co-op's high ethical guidelines regarding fair trade and the environment." The Co-op, which is owned by about 3 million consumers, also includes Britain's largest funeral parlour and farming business.

In Mario + Rabbids Kingdom Battle, in the level "Temple of Bwahmanweewee", Beep-0 parodies this song.

Hip hop group Public Enemy allude to it in their 2007 Dylan tribute song "Long and Whining Road": "Tears of rage left a friend blowing in the wind / But time is God, been back for ten years, and black again".

Nik Cohn describes "Blowin' in the Wind" as "the first anti-war song ever to make the charts and truthfully, it was possibly the worst song that he's written, it was embarrassing in its mimsiness, but that wasn't the point: it changed things regardless, it changed the whole concept of what could or couldn't be attempted in a hit song. Suddenly, pop writers could go beyond three-chord love songs, they didn't have to act mindless anymore. Mostly, they could say what they meant."

In June 2026, CBS News included the song in its list of the 250 essential American songs of the past 250 years.

== Certifications ==
| Region | Certification | Certified units/sales |
|---|---|---|
| Italy (FIMI) sales since 2009 | Gold | 25,000^{‡} |
| New Zealand (RMNZ) | Gold | 15,000^{‡} |
| Spain (Promusicae) | Gold | 30,000^{‡} |
| United Kingdom (BPI) sales since 2011 | Gold | 400,000^{‡} |
^{‡} Sales+streaming figures based on certification alone.

== Peter, Paul and Mary version ==
"Blowin' in the Wind"

Single by Peter, Paul and Mary

from the album In the Wind
- B-side: "Flora"
- Released: June 1963
- Recorded: 1963
- Genre: Folk; pop
- Length: 2:53
- Label: Warner Bros.
- Songwriter: Bob Dylan
- Producer: Albert Grossman

Peter, Paul and Mary singles chronology
| "Settle Down (Goin' Down That Highway)" (1963) | "Blowin' in the Wind" (1963) | "Don't Think Twice, It's All Right" (1963) |

"Blowin' in the Wind"

Single by Marianne Faithfull
- B-side: "The House of the Rising Sun"
- Released: 1964
- Genre: Pop
- Label: Decca
- Songwriter: Bob Dylan
- Producer: Andrew Loog Oldham

Marianne Faithfull singles chronology
| "As Tears Go By" (1964) | "Blowin' in the Wind" (1964) | "Come and Stay With Me" (1965) |

The most commercially successful version is by folk music trio Peter, Paul and Mary, who released the song in June 1963, three weeks after The Freewheelin' Bob Dylan was issued. Albert Grossman, then managing both Dylan and Peter, Paul and Mary, brought the trio the song which they promptly recorded (on a single take) and released. The trio's version, which was the title track of their third album, peaked at number two on the Billboard Hot 100 behind "Fingertips" by Stevie Wonder. The group's version also went to number one on the Middle-Road charts for five weeks. Cash Box described it as "a medium-paced sailor’s lament sung with feeling and authority by the folk trio."

In 1964 at the 6th Annual Grammy Awards, Peter, Paul & Mary won two Grammys for "Blowin' in the Wind": Best Folk Recording and Best Performance by a Vocal Group. In 2003, Peter, Paul & Mary's version of "Blowin' in the Wind" was inducted into the Grammy Hall of Fame.

=== Chart performance ===
| Chart (1963) | Peak position |
|---|---|
| Canada (CHUM Chart) | 25 |
| UK Singles (The Official Charts Company) | 13 |
| US Billboard Middle-Road singles | 1 |
| US Billboard Hot 100 | 2 |

== Other versions ==
"Blowin' in the Wind" has been recorded by hundreds of other artists.

- Marlene Dietrich recorded a German version of the song (titled "Die Antwort weiß ganz allein der Wind") which peaked at number 32 in Germany chart.
- Tore Lagergren wrote lyrics in Swedish, "Och vinden ger svar" ("and the wind gives answer"), which charted at Svensktoppen for two weeks in 1963, first as recorded by Otto, Berndt och Beppo, peaking at number 8 on October 12, and by Lars Lönndahl during November 9–15 with sixth & seventh position. Both were released on single A-sides in 1963. This version was also recorded by Sven-Ingvars as the B-side of the single "Du ska tro på mej", released in March 1967. With these lyrics, the song also charted at Svensktoppen in 1970, with Michael med Salt och peppar.
- In 1966, Stevie Wonder recorded his own version which became a top 10 hit on the Billboard Hot 100, as well as number one on the R&B charts. It reached #12 in Canada.
- In 2022, Dylan sold a newly recorded version of the song, produced by T Bone Burnett, on a new "one of one" analogue format known as an "Ionic Original" disc. The disc was sold via Christie's auction house for $1.78 million.

Joan Baez and Dylan have recorded this song live numerous times, and Baez recorded her own version.

== See also ==
- List of anti-war songs
- List of Bob Dylan songs based on earlier tunes
