= Lemon Tree (Will Holt song) =

Folk song written by Will Holt in the 1950s

"Lemon Tree" is a folk song written by Will Holt in the late 1950s. It was inspired by a Brazilian song, Meu limão meu limoeiro, originally written in 1930.

== Background ==
The tune is based on the Brazilian folk song Meu limão, meu limoeiro, arranged by José Carlos Burle in 1937 and made popular by Brazilian singer Wilson Simonal. The song compares love to a lemon tree: "Lemon tree very pretty, and the lemon flower is sweet, but the fruit of the poor lemon is impossible to eat."

== Trini Lopez recording ==
"Lemon Tree"

Song by Trini Lopez

from the album The Folk Album
- Released: 1965
- Genre: Folk
- Songwriter: Will Holt

In 1965, Trini Lopez recorded the most successful version of the song, which hit number twenty on the Billboard Hot 100 and number two on the Billboard Middle Road Singles chart. “I remember meeting Trini Lopez,” Holt told Portland Magazine in 2013. “He was a sweet guy, really charming. I heard his version of ‘Lemon Tree,’ and I thought, that's another take of the song.”

== Other recorded versions ==
The song has also been recorded by:

- Peter, Paul and Mary (1962), this version marked the trio's first appearance on the US Hot 100. It charted at #35.
- The Impressions
- Chad & Jeremy
- The Kingston Trio
- The Seekers
- The Wailers
- Herb Alpert and the Tijuana Brass (1965), on Whipped Cream & Other Delights
- Sandie Shaw
- Roger Whittaker.
- Low-Maintenance Perennials as "Lemon Peel Mmm (Live At Altamont)" on Jurassic Park: The Album
- Lord Bill Barnes (1966) on The Greatest Calypso Hits

== Popular culture ==
- Wrangler Jane sings "Lemon Tree" in the second season F Troop episode "That's Show Biz".
- A reference is made to the song in the Seinfeld episode "The Phone Message" (Season 2, Episode 4, 17:38).
- Another television reference has the character Jefferson D'Arcy singing it during a dream sequence in the Married... with Children episode "Lookin' for a Desk in All the Wrong Places" (Season 6, Episode 5, 17:00).
- In the 1972 animated film, Fritz the Cat, a rabbit character refers to the song while bemoaning that the park where they normally play to pick up women is overrun with other guitar players playing multiple renditions of it.
- It was adapted as a jingle in the late 1960s for Lemon Pledge.
- "Lemon Tree" is an essential reference in Tim O'Brien's The Things They Carried.
- In the 1995 film Apollo 13 the song plays on the astronauts' cassette player during their broadcast back to Earth, as they demonstrate how to consume an orange drink in zero gravity.

== See also ==
- List of Peter Paul & Mary songs
- List of The Seekers songs
