= Peter, Paul and Mary =

American folk music group

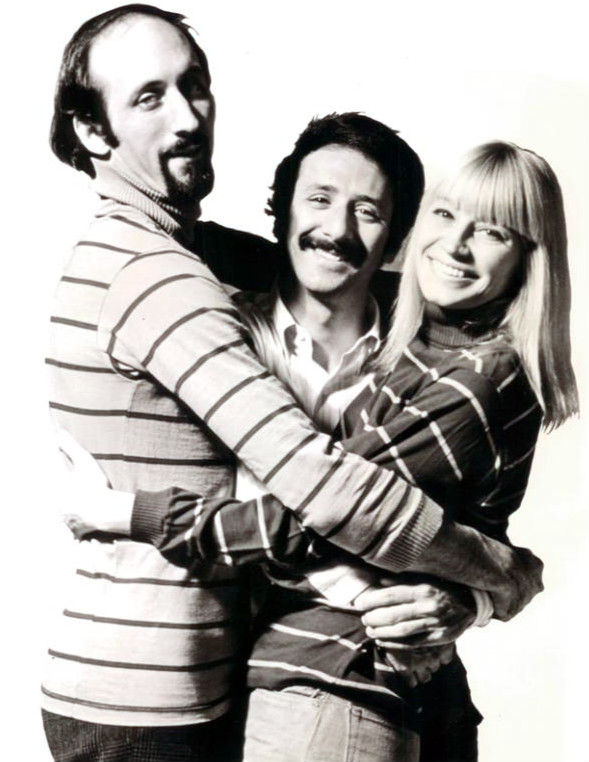
- Left to right: Paul Stookey, Peter Yarrow, and Mary Travers, c. 1968

Background information
- Origin: New York City, U.S.
- Genres: Folk; pop
- Works: Peter, Paul and Mary discography
- Years active: 1961–1970; 1972; 1978; 1981–2009
- Label: Warner Bros.
- Past members: Peter Yarrow; Paul Stookey; Mary Travers
- Website: peterpaulandmary.com

Peter, Paul and Mary was an American folk group formed in New York City in 1961 during the American folk music revival. The trio consisted of Peter Yarrow (guitar, tenor vocals), Paul Stookey (guitar, baritone vocals), and Mary Travers (contralto vocals). The group's repertoire included traditional songs, songs written by Yarrow and Stookey, early songs by Bob Dylan, and songs of other "folk-revival" musicians such as Pete Seeger.

They were very successful in the early- and mid-1960s, with their debut album topping the charts for weeks, and helped popularize the folk music revival. Following Travers's death in 2009, Yarrow and Stookey continued to perform as a duo. Yarrow died in 2025, leaving Stookey the sole surviving member of the group.

Travers said she was influenced by Woody Guthrie, Pete Seeger, and the Weavers. In May 1963, Stookey described the formation and dynamics of the group on Folk Music Worldwide, an international short-wave radio show in New York City. In the 2004 documentary Peter, Paul & Mary: Carry It On – A Musical Legacy, members of the Weavers discuss how Peter, Paul and Mary took over the torch of the social commentary of folk music in the 1960s.

The group were inducted into the Vocal Group Hall of Fame in 1999. Peter, Paul and Mary received the Sammy Cahn Lifetime Achievement Award from the Songwriters Hall of Fame in 2006.

== History ==
=== Early years and popularity (1961–1969) ===
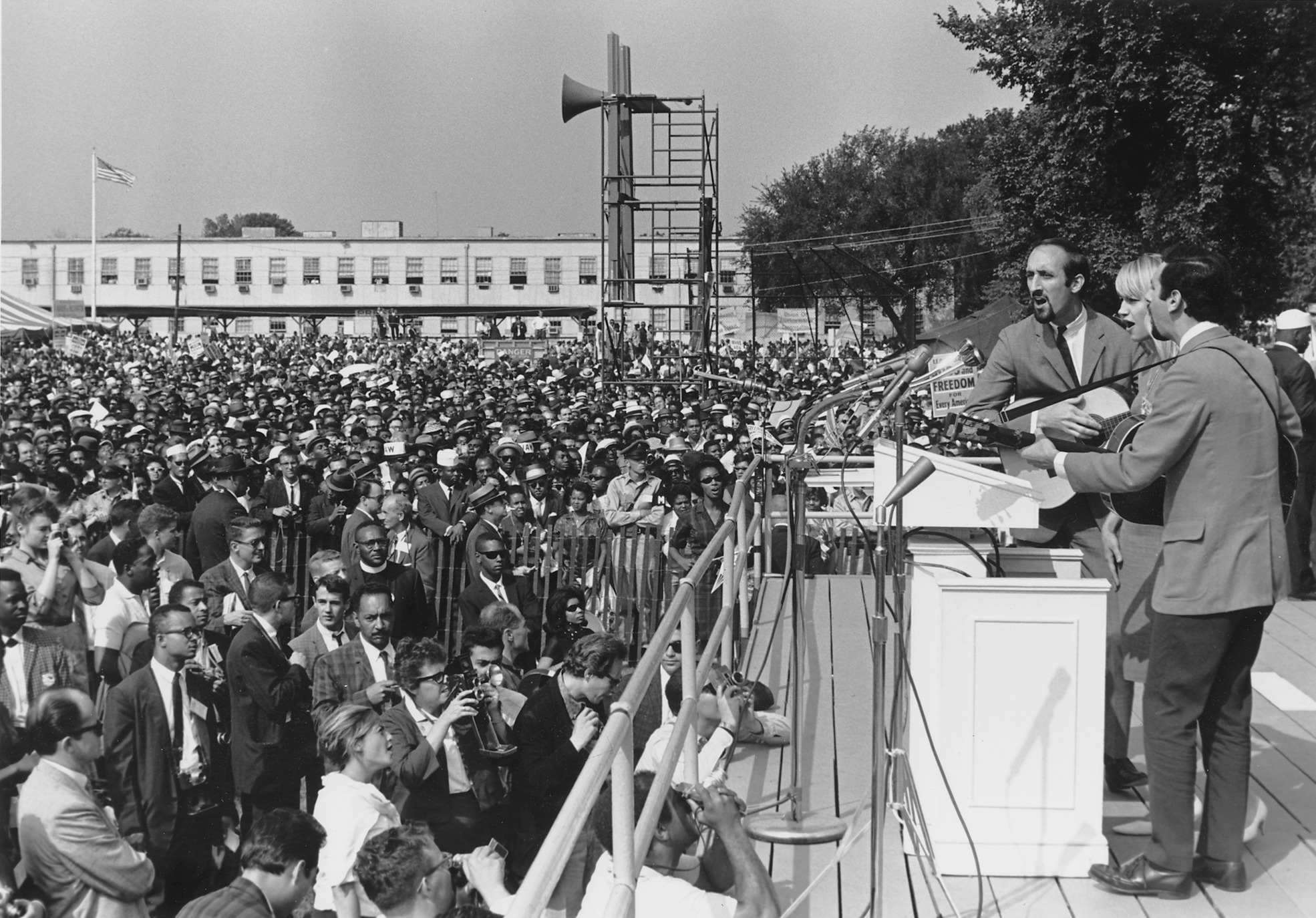
The trio performing at the 1963 Civil Rights March on Washington, D.C.

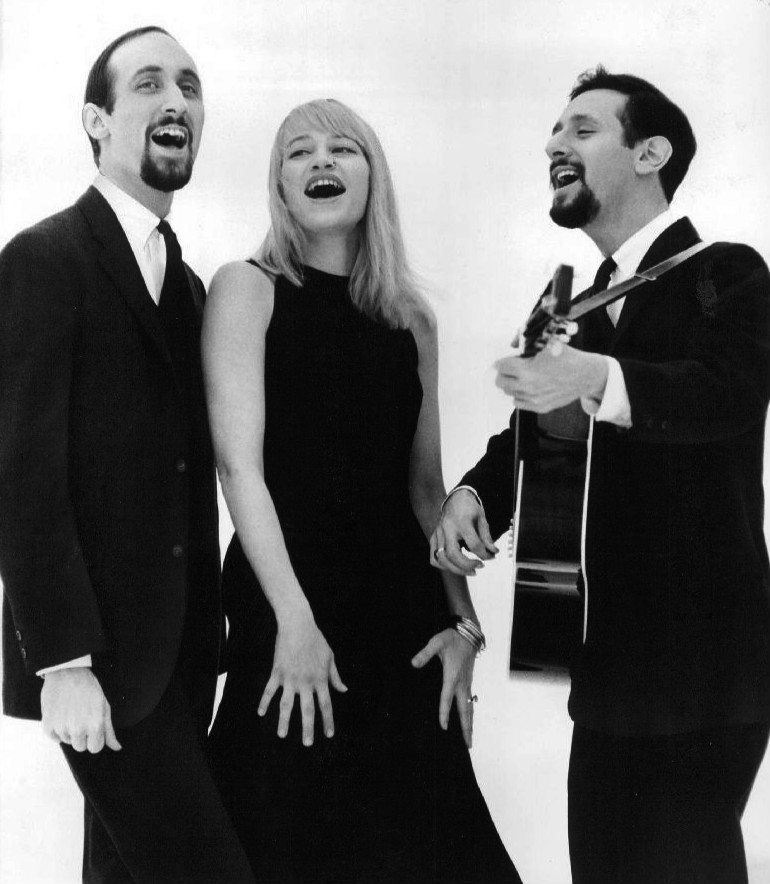
1963 publicity shot

Manager Albert Grossman created Peter, Paul and Mary in 1961, after auditioning several singers in the New York folk scene, including Dave Van Ronk, who was rejected as too idiosyncratic and uncommercial, and Carolyn Hester. After rehearsing Yarrow, Stookey and Travers out of town in Boston and Miami, Grossman booked them into The Bitter End, a coffee house, nightclub and popular folk music venue in New York City's Greenwich Village.

The group recorded their debut album, Peter, Paul and Mary, and it was released by Warner Bros. the following year. It included "Lemon Tree", "500 Miles", and the Pete Seeger hit tunes "If I Had a Hammer" (subtitled "The Hammer Song") and "Where Have All the Flowers Gone?" The album was listed in the Billboard Top Ten for 10 months, including seven weeks in the No. 1 position. It remained a main catalog-seller for decades to come, eventually selling over two million copies, earning double platinum certification from the RIAA in the United States alone.

In 1963 the group released "Puff, the Magic Dragon", with music by Yarrow and words based on a poem that had been written by a fellow student at Cornell, Leonard Lipton. Despite rumors that the song refers to drugs, it is actually about the lost innocence of childhood. The same year, they appeared as the "mystery guest" on the CBS TV game show What's My Line? in which Dorothy Kilgallen correctly guessed their identity.

That year the group performed "If I Had a Hammer" and "Blowin' in the Wind" at the August 1963 March on Washington for Jobs and Freedom, best remembered for Martin Luther King Jr.'s "I Have a Dream" speech. The Bob Dylan song "Blowin' in the Wind" was one of their biggest hit singles. They also sang other Dylan songs, such as "The Times They Are a-Changin'", "Don't Think Twice, It's All Right", and "When the Ship Comes In". Their success with Dylan's "Don't Think Twice, It's All Right" helped Dylan's The Freewheelin' Bob Dylan album rise into the top 30; it had been released four months earlier. In 1963 while in London, on one or possibly more occasions they recorded 5 songs in front of a live television audience for the UK regional television folk and blues music series Hullabaloo, presented by the Scottish folksinger Rory McEwen; these sessions were released on DVD in 2020.

In December 1969 "Leaving on a Jet Plane", written by the group's friend John Denver, became their only No. 1 single (as well as their final top 40 pop hit) and the group's sixth million-selling gold single. The track first appeared on their million-selling platinum certified Album 1700 in 1967 (which also contained their No. 9 hit "I Dig Rock and Roll Music"). After Eugene McCarthy's strong showing in the 1968 New Hampshire presidential primary, the group recorded "Eugene McCarthy For President (If You Love Your Country)" endorsing McCarthy, which was released without a record label. "Day Is Done", a No. 21 hit in June 1969 from the trio's Grammy Award-winning album Peter, Paul and Mommy, was the last Hot 100 hit the trio recorded.

=== Breakup (1970–1978) ===
The trio broke up in 1970 to pursue solo careers. Also that year, Yarrow was convicted of molesting a 14-year-old girl; in 1981, he received a presidential pardon from Jimmy Carter.

During 1971 and 1972 Warner released a debut solo album, with the same style cover, by each member of the group. Travers did concerts and lectures across the United States. She also produced, wrote, and starred in a BBC-TV series. Stookey formed a Christian music group, the Body Works Band, and wrote "The Wedding Song (There Is Love)" for Yarrow's marriage to Marybeth McCarthy, the niece of Eugene McCarthy. Britain's Petula Clark also recorded a version of the song, which in 1973 charted strongly in the UK, Australia and elsewhere. Yarrow co-wrote and produced Mary MacGregor's Torn Between Two Lovers (No. 1, 1977) and earned an Emmy for three animated TV specials based on "Puff the Magic Dragon".

While the group was de facto broken up and touring separately, it still managed to come together for a series of reunions before officially coming back together again. In 1972, the trio reunited for Together for McGovern, a concert at Madison Square Garden to support George McGovern's presidential campaign, and again in 1978 for a concert to protest nuclear energy. This concert was followed by a 1978 summer reunion tour, including a September 3 evening performance at Red Rocks Amphitheatre. An album, Reunion, was released by Warner in 1978.

=== Reunion (1981–2009) ===
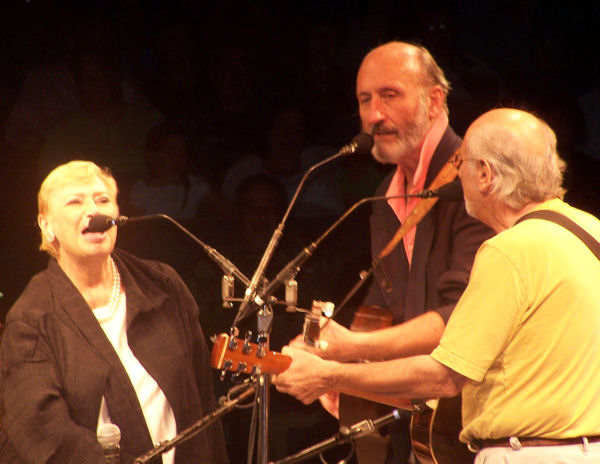
Peter, Paul and Mary in 2006

Their 1978 summer reunion tour was so popular that the group decided to reunite more or less permanently in 1981. They continued to record albums and tour, playing around 45 shows a year, until Travers's 2009 death. After their reunion, double-bassist Dick Kniss (who had been their bassist in their studio recordings and with their 1960s tours) rejoined the group. Starting in 1990, multi-instrumentalist Paul Prestopino also joined the group.

According to the flow of the times, they derived a way to change the lyrics of their songs, for example changing boys in the "Puff" became girls and boys. The trio received the Peace Abbey Courage of Conscience award on September 1, 1990.

In 2004, Travers was diagnosed with leukemia, leading to the cancellation of that year's remaining tour dates. She received a bone marrow transplant. She and the rest of the trio resumed their tour on December 9, 2005, with a holiday performance at Carnegie Hall.

The trio canceled several dates of their summer 2007 tour, as Travers had to undergo a second surgery. She was unable to perform on the trio's tour in mid-2009 because of the effects of leukemia, but Yarrow and Stookey performed the scheduled dates as a duo, calling the show "Peter & Paul Celebrate Mary and 5 Decades of Friendship".

On September 16, 2009, Travers died at age 72, of complications from chemotherapy, following treatment for leukemia. That same year, Peter, Paul and Mary were inducted into the Hit Parade Hall of Fame.

On January 7, 2025, Yarrow died of bladder cancer at age 86. With his death, Stookey is the last surviving member of the group.

== Discography ==
- Peter, Paul and Mary (1962)
- Moving (1963)
- In the Wind (1963)
- A Song Will Rise (1965)
- See What Tomorrow Brings (1965)
- The Peter, Paul and Mary Album (1966)
- Album 1700 (1967)
- Late Again (1968)
- Peter, Paul and Mommy (1969)
- Reunion (1978)
- No Easy Walk to Freedom (1986)
- Flowers and Stones (1990)
- Peter, Paul & Mommy, Too (1993)
- LifeLines (1995)
- In These Times (2003)

== See also ==
- List of number-one hits (United States)
- List of artists who reached number one on the Hot 100 (U.S.)
