= Peter Yarrow =

American singer and songwriter (1938–2025)

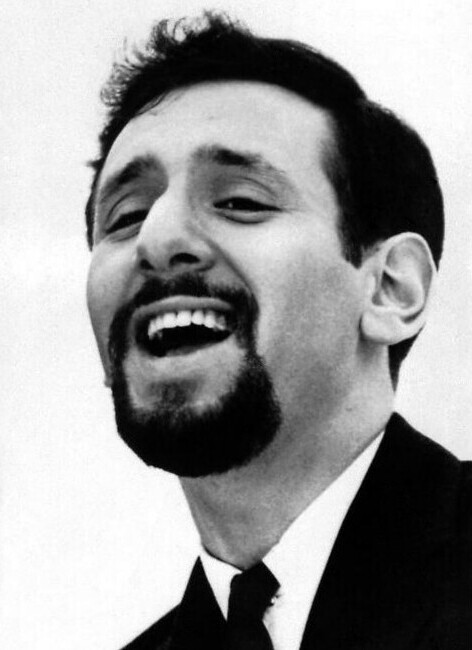
- Yarrow in 1970

Background information
- Born: May 31, 1938; New York City, U.S.
- Died: January 7, 2025 (aged 86) New York City, U.S.
- Genre: Folk
- Occupations: Singer-songwriter; guitarist; record producer
- Instruments: Vocals; guitar
- Years active: 1950s–2024
- Formerly of: Peter, Paul and Mary (1961–1970; 1978–2008); Peter and Noel Paul (2009–2025)
- Spouse: Mary Beth McCarthy (m. 1969; div. 1981; m. 2022)

Signature
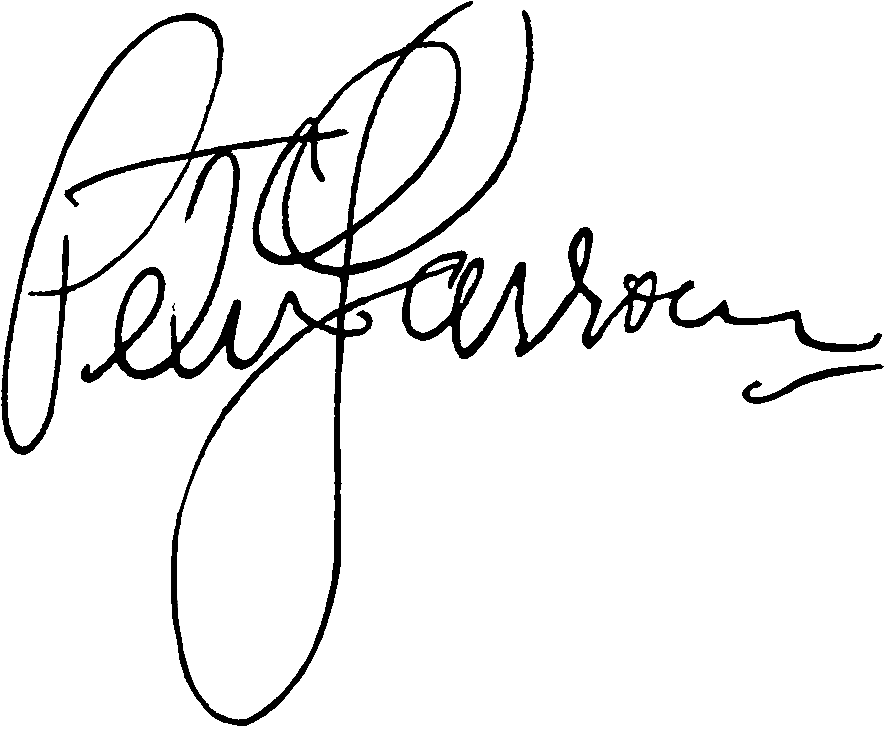

Peter Yarrow (May 31, 1938 – January 7, 2025) was an American singer and songwriter who found fame as a member of the 1960s folk trio Peter, Paul and Mary along with Paul Stookey and Mary Travers.

Born in Manhattan in 1938, he attended New York's High School of Music and Art as a teenager and was then accepted at Cornell University. During his last year at Cornell in 1959, he began his music career as a student guitar instructor there, and after graduating, met the manager and impresario Albert Grossman. Grossman's idea of a musical trio eventually led to Yarrow forming a folk band with Stookey and Travers.

Peter, Paul and Mary's early hits included "Lemon Tree" and "If I Had a Hammer", which was followed by their self-titled debut studio album in 1962. Yarrow co-wrote (with Lenny Lipton) one of the group's best known hits, "Puff, the Magic Dragon" (1963). He was also involved in the civil rights movement, performing for the March on Washington and Selma to Montgomery marches. In 1970, Yarrow was convicted of sexually abusing 14-year-old Barbara Winter and was imprisoned for three months; he later received a pardon from president Jimmy Carter.

Yarrow pursued a solo career in the 1970s, releasing his debut album, Peter, in 1972. He received awards for his continued activism. In the 2000s, he engaged in anti-bullying efforts in schools, for which helped start Operation Respect. Yarrow died of bladder cancer at his Upper West Side apartment in 2025.

== Early life and family ==
Peter Yarrow was born in Manhattan on May 31, 1938. His parents were Ukrainian Jewish immigrants whose families had settled in Providence, Rhode Island.

Peter spent the summers of 1951 and 1952 at Interlochen's Music camp. He graduated second in his class among male students from New York City's High School of Music and Art, where he had studied painting and received a physics prize. There he was classmates with Billy Dee Williams. He was accepted at Cornell University, where he began as a physics major but soon switched to psychology, graduating with a Bachelor of Arts in 1959. Among his Cornell classmates were Lenny Lipton and Richard Fariña.

== Music career ==
Yarrow began singing in public during his last year at Cornell while participating in Harold Thompson's popular American Folk Literature course, colloquially known on campus as "Romp-n-Stomp". The course was "a highlight of late-1950s student life at Cornell," Yarrow later recalled, and singing and guitar-playing skills were prerequisites for enrollment. Thompson would lecture on a given topic for 20 or 30 minutes and afterwards a student would sing songs related to his theme. Yarrow served as a student instructor for the class and was paid a stipend of $500 (equivalent to about 20% of his tuition fees), leading students in the songs. These included traditional folk songs and murder ballads, Dust Bowl songs made popular by Woody Guthrie, and songs associated with the civil rights movement.

Upon graduation, Yarrow played in New York City folk clubs, appeared on the CBS television show Folk Sound USA, and performed at the Newport Folk Festival, where he met manager and musical impresario Albert Grossman. One day, the two were at Israel Young's Folklore Center in Greenwich Village discussing Grossman's idea for a new group that would be "an updated version of the Weavers for the baby-boom generation ... with the crossover appeal of The Kingston Trio." Yarrow noticed a picture of Mary Travers on the wall and asked Grossman who she was. "That's Mary Travers," Grossman said. "She'd be good if you could get her to work." The Kentucky-born Travers was well connected in Greenwich Village folk circles. While still a student at Elizabeth Irwin High School in Manhattan, she had been selected by Elizabeth Irwin's chorus leader, Robert De Cormier, to join "The Song Swappers" trio in backing up Pete Seeger in the 1955 Folkways LP reissue of The Almanac Singers' Talking Union and two other albums. In addition to performing twice with Seeger at Carnegie Hall, Travers had performed the role of a folksinger in The Next President, a short-lived Broadway play, starring satirist Mort Sahl, but she was known to be painfully introverted and loath to sing professionally.

To draw Travers out, Yarrow went to her apartment on MacDougal Street, across from The Gaslight Cafe, one of the principal folk clubs. They harmonized on 'Miner's Lifeguard,' a union song, and decided that their voices blended well. To fill out the trio, Travers suggested Noel Stookey, a friend doing folk music and stand-up comedy at the Gaslight. They chose "Peter, Paul and Mary" as the name for their group, since Noel Stookey's middle name was Paul, and rehearsed intensively for six months, touring outside New York before debuting in 1961 as a polished act at The Bitter End nightclub in Greenwich Village. There, the singers quickly developed a following and signed a contract with Warner Bros.

Warner released Peter, Paul and Mary's "Lemon Tree" as a single in early 1962. The trio then released "If I Had a Hammer", a 1949 song by Pete Seeger and Lee Hays, written to protest the imprisonment of Harlem City Councilman Benjamin J. Davis Jr. under the Smith Act. "If I had a Hammer" garnered two Grammy Awards in 1962. The trio's first album, the eponymous Peter, Paul & Mary, remained in the Top 10 for ten months and in the Top 20 for two years; it sold more than two million copies. The group toured extensively and recorded numerous albums, both live and in the studio.

In June 1963, Peter, Paul and Mary released a 7" single of "Blowin' in the Wind" by the then-relatively unknown Bob Dylan, who was also managed by Grossman. "Blowin' in the Wind" sold 300,000 copies in the first week of release; by August 17, it was number two on the Billboard pop chart, with sales exceeding one million copies. Yarrow recalled that when he told Dylan he would make more than $5,000 (equivalent to $53,000 in 2025) from the publishing rights, Dylan was speechless. On August 28, 1963, Peter, Paul and Mary appeared on stage with the Reverend Martin Luther King Jr. at the March on Washington where their performance of "Blowin' in the Wind" established it as a civil rights anthem. Their version also spent weeks on Billboard's easy listening chart. By 1964 the 26-year-old Yarrow had joined the Board of the Newport Folk Festival, where he had performed as an unknown just four years earlier.

Yarrow's songwriting helped to create some of Peter, Paul and Mary's best-known songs, including "Puff, the Magic Dragon", "Day Is Done", "Light One Candle", and "The Great Mandala". As a member of the trio, he earned a 1996 Emmy nomination for the Great Performances special LifeLines Live, a highly acclaimed celebration of folk music, with their musical mentors, contemporaries, and a new generation of singer-songwriters.

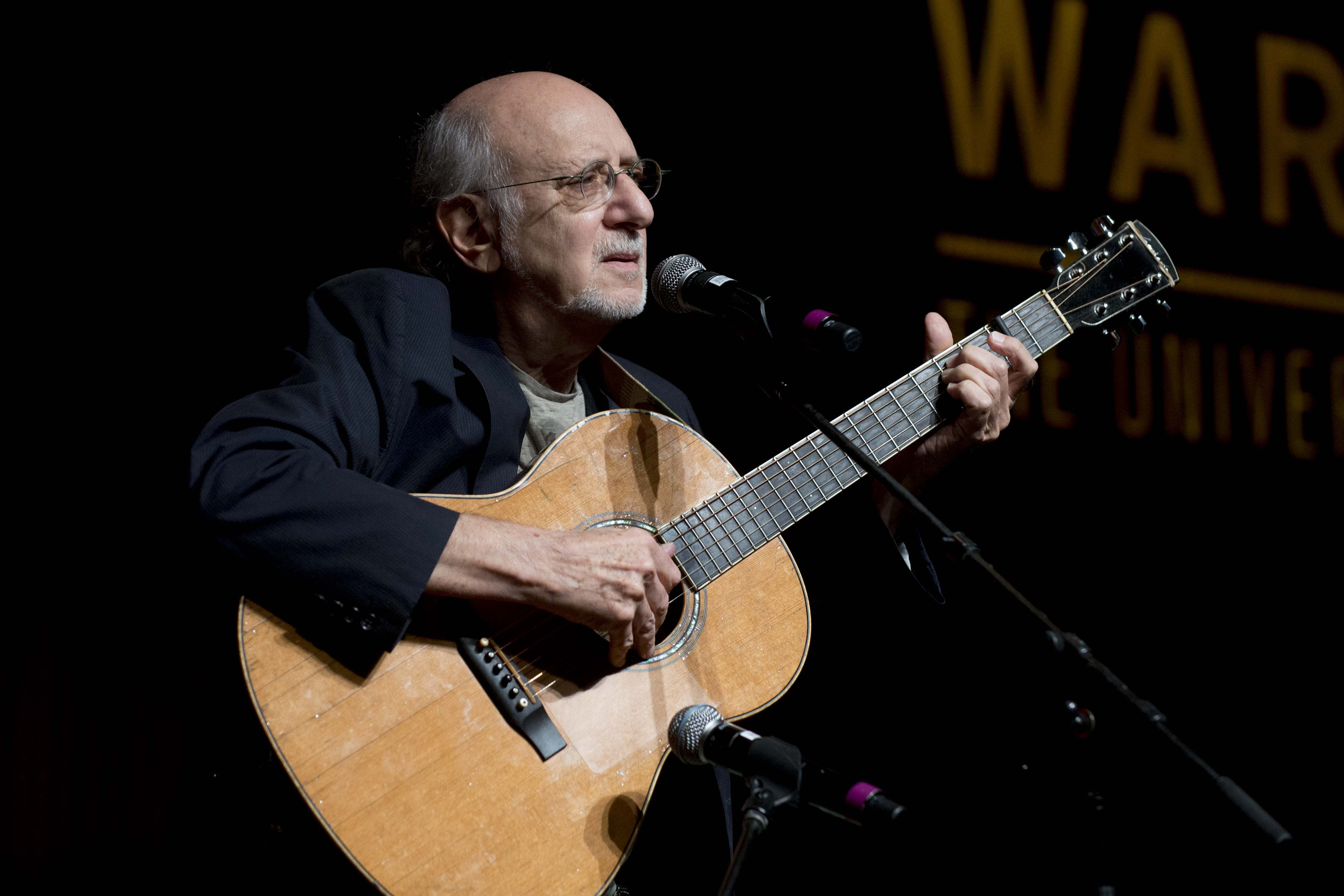
Yarrow at the LBJ Presidential Library in 2016

Yarrow was instrumental in founding the New Folks Concert series at both the Newport Folk Festival and the Kerrville Folk Festival. His work at Kerrville has been called his "most important achievement in this arena".

Yarrow co-wrote and produced "Torn Between Two Lovers", a number one hit for Mary MacGregor. He also produced three CBS TV specials based on "Puff the Magic Dragon", which earned an Emmy nomination for him. In 1978 Yarrow organized Survival Sunday, an anti-nuclear benefit, and after a period of separation, he was once again joined by Stookey and Travers.

Yarrow and his daughter, Bethany Yarrow, often performed together. Together with cellist Rufus Cappadocia, they formed the trio Peter, Bethany, and Rufus. They released the CD Puff & Other Family Classics. In 2008, the musical special Peter, Bethany & Rufus: Spirit of Woodstock, featuring a live performance of the band, aired on public television.

Yarrow portrayed leftist intellectual Ira Mandelstam in the 2015 film While We're Young. In the 2024 Bob Dylan biopic A Complete Unknown, Yarrow is portrayed by Nick Pupo.

== Criminal conviction ==
In 1970, Yarrow was convicted of taking "immoral and improper liberties" with 14-year-old Barbara Winter. The incident occurred on August 31, 1969, when Winter and her 17-year-old sister, Kathie Berkel, visited Yarrow's room at the Shoreham Hotel in Washington, D.C., seeking autographs. Winter told police that Yarrow answered the door naked and made her manually stimulate him until he ejaculated. Yarrow argued in court that the act was consensual, but Winter has repeatedly denied this. He was sentenced to one to three years in prison, but served only three months.

Yarrow was granted a federal pardon by Jimmy Carter on January 19, 1981, the day before Carter's presidency ended. Yarrow later expressed regret for the incident, stating: "It was an era of real indiscretion and mistakes by categorically male performers. I was one of them. I got nailed. I was wrong. I'm sorry for it."

Throughout the 2010s, Yarrow's conviction repeatedly affected his public engagements. In 2013, Democratic congressional candidate Martha Robertson received backlash for inviting Yarrow to perform at a campaign fundraiser. A similar outcry came in 2014 when Fiorello H. LaGuardia High School named Yarrow the guest of honor at a gala hosted by Al Roker. In 2019, Yarrow's appearance at the Colorscape Arts Festival in New York was cancelled after organizers learned of his offense.

In February 2021, The Washington Post revealed other allegations of sexual assault made against Yarrow, including the alleged rape of a teenage girl from Saint Paul, Minnesota, the same year that he assaulted Winter.

== Social activism ==
Yarrow had long been an activist for social and political causes. What he did was not always popular. According to The New York Times:

As their fame grew, Peter, Paul and Mary mixed music with political and social activism. The trio marched with Martin Luther King Jr. in Washington, D.C., in 1963 and in Selma, Alabama, in 1965. The three participated in countless demonstrations against the war in Vietnam. They sang at the 1969 March on Washington, which Mr. Yarrow helped to organize. Though their activism provoked a steady stream of death threats, they were never harmed. "But for years, I used to bite my fingernails on stage," [Mary] Travers says. "There you are and look like the back porch light, and stare out at 12,000 or 15,000 people. Any one of whom could have had a gun."

=== Operation Respect ===
In 2000, in an effort to combat school bullying, Yarrow helped start Operation Respect, a nonprofit organization that brings to children, in schools and camps, a curriculum of tolerance and respect for each other's differences. The project began as a result of Yarrow and his daughter Bethany and his son Christopher having heard the song "Don't Laugh at Me" (written by Steve Seskin and Allen Shamblin) at the Kerrville Folk Festival.

In March 2008, Yarrow told Reuters:

Operation Respect has been my main and all-consuming work for the past 10 years. My perception is that the kind of bullying, humiliation that goes on in children's schools leads to high rates of depression that was virtually unknown when I was young and the high suicide rate of teenagers which we know is almost inevitably caused by bullying or mean-spiritedness. It is a reflection of the role models that young people observe on TV shows like a lot of the reality shows. It is also part and parcel of the characteristics in the adult world of America.

=== Other activism ===
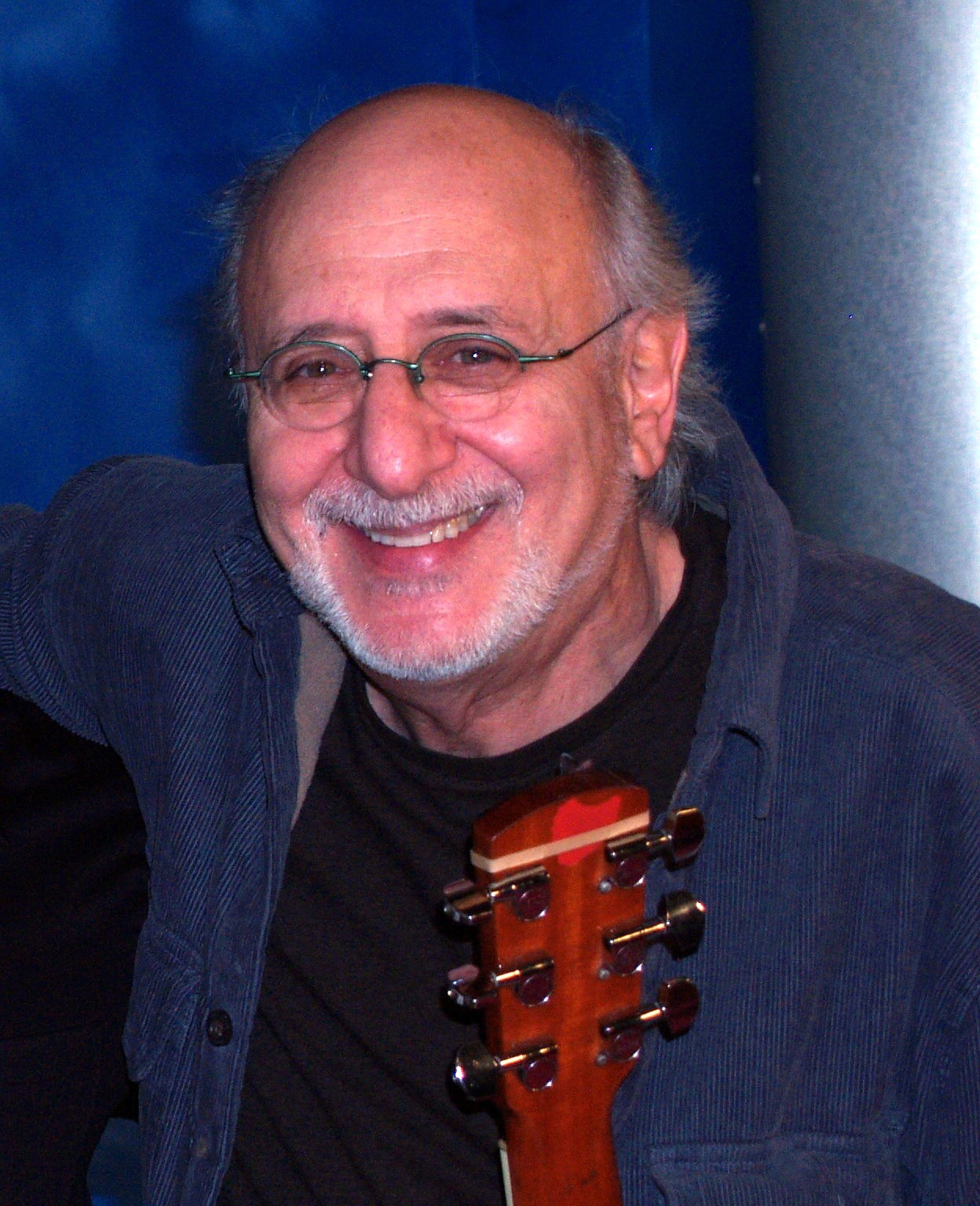
Yarrow in 2008

Yarrow was a leadership in the Soviet Jewry movement. Of the song "Light One Candle", Rabbi Allison Bergman Vann wrote:

Peter Yarrow's now famous song, which was written in 1983, became a defining song for my generation of high school and college students to become activists, to make the world a better place. I heard Peter Yarrow singing that song on the steps of the Capitol, in 1987, twenty years ago next week, during the march to free Soviet Jews. Listening to him sing, surrounded by literally thousands of like-minded individuals, I learned of my obligation to change the world; to engage in tikkun olam, repair of our broken world. And, during that incredible day, I knew that we could, indeed, change the world.

Yarrow performed in Ho Chi Minh City at a concert to benefit the Vietnam Association of Victims of Agent Orange in 2005; Yarrow pleaded with the Vietnamese for forgiveness of the United States.

Yarrow served on the board of directors of the Connecticut Hospice.

Yarrow performed across New York City for volunteers who worked for the presidential campaign of Senator Barack Obama on November 1, 2008.

Yarrow, his son and his daughter made an appearance at Zuccotti Park during the Occupy Wall Street protests on October 3, 2011, playing songs such as "We Shall Not Be Moved" and a variation of "Puff the Magic Dragon".

Yarrow was a member of Braver Angels.

== Personal life ==
Yarrow cited Judaism as one of the roots of his liberal views. To him, "Jewishness means to live according to justice and that's a burden, it means we have to form our own set of morality and values and live by them."

While campaigning for 1968 presidential candidate Eugene McCarthy, Yarrow met McCarthy's niece, Mary Beth McCarthy, in Wisconsin. He was 31 at the time and she was 20. They were married in October 1969 in Willmar, Minnesota. Paul Stookey wrote "Wedding Song (There Is Love)" as his gift for their wedding and first performed it at St. Mary's Church in Willmar. Yarrow and McCarthy had two children, daughter Bethany and son Christopher. They divorced in 1981. They remarried in 2022 and were together until his death in 2025.

Yarrow's Larrivée acoustic guitar was stolen on an airplane flight in December 2000. Fans spotted the guitar on eBay in early 2005. The FBI recovered it in Sunny Isles Beach, Florida and returned it to Yarrow. He did not press charges since the person it was recovered from was not the person who had stolen it.

Yarrow acknowledged being an alcoholic and sought treatment for alcoholism. He considered himself in recovery.

A longtime resident of New York City, Yarrow also owned a vacation home in Telluride, Colorado. His son Christopher is a visual artist who, in the late 2000s, owned an emporium in Portland, Oregon called The Monkey & The Rat.

=== Illness and death ===
Yarrow died from bladder cancer at his Upper West Side apartment, on January 7, 2025, after a month in hospice care. He was 86 and had been diagnosed with the illness four years prior.

== Awards and honors ==
Yarrow received the Allard K. Lowenstein Award in 1982 for his "remarkable efforts in advancing the causes of human rights, peace, and freedom". In 1995 the Miami Jewish Federation recognized Yarrow's continual efforts by awarding its Tikkun Olam Award for his part in helping to "repair the world".

Yarrow was awarded the Kate Wolf Memorial Award by the World Folk Music Association in 1993.

In 2003 a congressional resolution recognized Yarrow's achievements and those of Operation Respect.

== Discography ==
=== Solo ===
- 1972: Peter (US No. 163)
- 1973: That's Enough for Me (US No. 203)
- 1975: Hard Times
- 1975: Love Songs
- 2010: The Peter Yarrow Sing-Along Special

=== Peter, Bethany and Rufus ===
- 2008: Puff & Other Family Classics

=== Other contributions ===
- 1971: Lazarus – Lazarus; producer
- 1973: A Fool's Paradise – Lazarus; producer
- 1984: Here With Me – Kamifusen; songwriter, "Cherry Blossom"
- 2020: Color Outside the Lines – Jim Stanard; vocals on songs "Home" and "Arkansas", along with Bethany Yarrow

== Bibliography ==
- Puff, the Magic Dragon, by Peter Yarrow, Lenny Lipton, Eric Puybaret (illustrator), Sterling Publishing, released in August 2007, ISBN 978-1-4027-4782-3
- The Peter Yarrow Songbook: Favorite Folk Songs, by Peter Yarrow, Terry Widener (illustrator), Sterling Publishing, released November 4, 2008, ISBN 978-1-4027-5961-1
- The Peter Yarrow Songbook: Sleepytime Songs, by Peter Yarrow, Terry Widener (Illustrator), Sterling Publishing, released November 4, 2008, ISBN 978-1-4027-5962-8
- Day Is Done, by Peter Yarrow, Melissa Sweet (Illustrator), Sterling Publishing, released October 2009, ISBN 978-1-4027-4806-6
- The Peter Yarrow Songbook: Songs for Little Folks, by Peter Yarrow, Terry Widener (Illustrator), Sterling Publishing, released May 2010, ISBN 978-1-4027-5964-2

== See also ==
- List of peace activists
- List of people pardoned or granted clemency by the president of the United States
