= Milt Okun =

American singer and record producer (1923–2016)

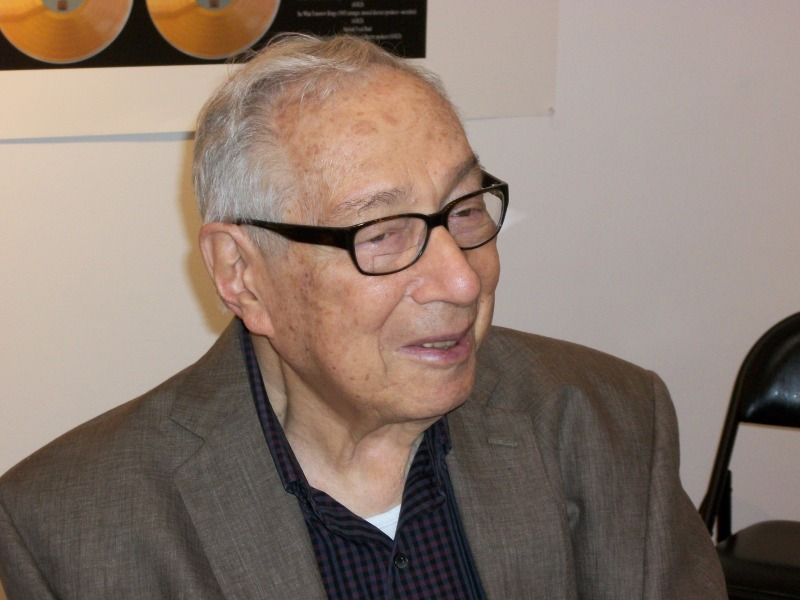
- Okun in 2011

Background information
- Born: December 23, 1923; Brooklyn, New York
- Died: November 15, 2016 (aged 92); Beverly Hills, California
- Occupations: Arranger; record producer; conductor; singer
- Labels: Cherry Lane Music Publishing Company, Inc

Milton Theodore Okun /ˈoʊkən/ (December 23, 1923 – November 15, 2016) was an American arranger, record producer, conductor, singer and founder of Cherry Lane Music Publishing Company, Inc. Okun transformed the careers of a dozen or more major U.S. artists who under his tutelage became some of the most successful musical acts of the 1950s, 1960s, and 1970s. His career lasted over 50 years from the folk revival of the 1950s to the 21st century.

Okun created arrangements or produced tracks for many popular groups and artists such as the Chad Mitchell Trio, Peter, Paul and Mary, the Brothers Four, John Denver, and Miriam Makeba. In 1968 he interviewed a number of American pop folksingers and published the songs they chose in Something to Sing About!

At the height of Okun's career, critic Richard Sparks wrote, "Of all producers, Milton Okun's range is the widest, from Plácido Domingo to the Muppets." During a hiatus in his work as conductor for Harry Belafonte, Okun took on the Chad Mitchell Trio as his first folk trio, later signing Tom Paxton as a client for his new Cherry Lane Music publishing company when Paxton auditioned unsuccessfully for an opening in the trio. Okun began his long association with John Denver after Denver replaced Chad Mitchell in the renamed "Mitchell Trio" as well as bringing Denver to stardom and producing some of his most beloved hits. Okun was also an arranger and producer for Peter, Paul and Mary, and his Cherry Lane Music became the music publishing company for Elvis Presley and DreamWorks among other successful acts.

Okun died on November 15, 2016, at the age of 92.

== Honors ==
In 2008, Okun won the Abe Olman Publisher Award at the Songwriters Hall of Fame ceremony. Milton T. Okun published his memoir, Along the Cherry Lane, on June 13, 2011.

== Discography ==
Okun was part of the folk quartet the Skifflers and also recorded several albums of his own in the 1950s.

- Every Inch a Sailor (Stinson SLP65) [not to be confused with an album of the same name by Oscar Brand]
- I Sing of Canada (Stinson SLP71)
- Adirondack Folk Songs And Ballads (Stinson SLP82)
- America's Best Loved Folk Songs (Baton BL 1203/Warwick 2011)
- Merry Ditties (Riverside RLP 12-603)
- (with Ellen Stekert) Traditional American Love Songs (Riverside RLP 12-634)
- Goin' Down to Town (Epic) by the Skifflers; later edited and re-released as Hootenanny with the Skifflers (Columbia HL7307), and as Folk Songs (Perfect Records)
- Everybody Sing! Volume 3 – Songs for Seniors (Riverside RLP 1420)

== Books ==
- 1968: Something to Sing About: The Personal Choices of America's Folk Singers. New York: Macmillan Company ISBN 978-0-02-592820-6
- New York Times Great Songs of the Sixties (as editor)
- New York Times Great Songs of ABBA (as editor)
- Great Songs of the Seventies (as editor)
- New York Times Great Songs of Lennon and McCartney (as editor; also wrote introduction)
- The Compleat Beatles (as editor)
- Twin Peaks (as editor)
- Along the Cherry Lane: Tales from the life of the music industry legend, producer, arranger, and publisher Milton Okun (as told to Richard Sparks) – 2011
  - Review by What Is That Book About?
  - Review by BookHounds
