= List of Billboard Hot 100 number-one singles of the 1970s =

The Billboard Hot 100 is the main song chart of the American music industry and is updated every week by the Billboard magazine. During the 1970s the chart was based collectively on each single's weekly physical sales figures and airplay on American radio stations.

== Number ones ==
Key
♪ – Number-one single of the year

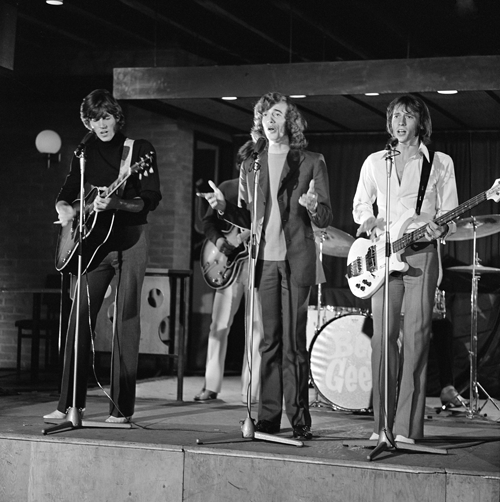
The Bee Gees scored the most number-one hits (nine songs) and had the longest cumulative run atop the Billboard Hot 100 chart (27 weeks) during the 1970s.

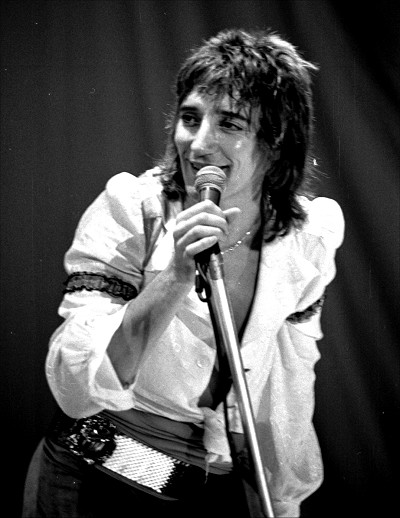
Rod Stewart remained at the top of the Billboard Hot 100 chart for 17 weeks during the 1970s.

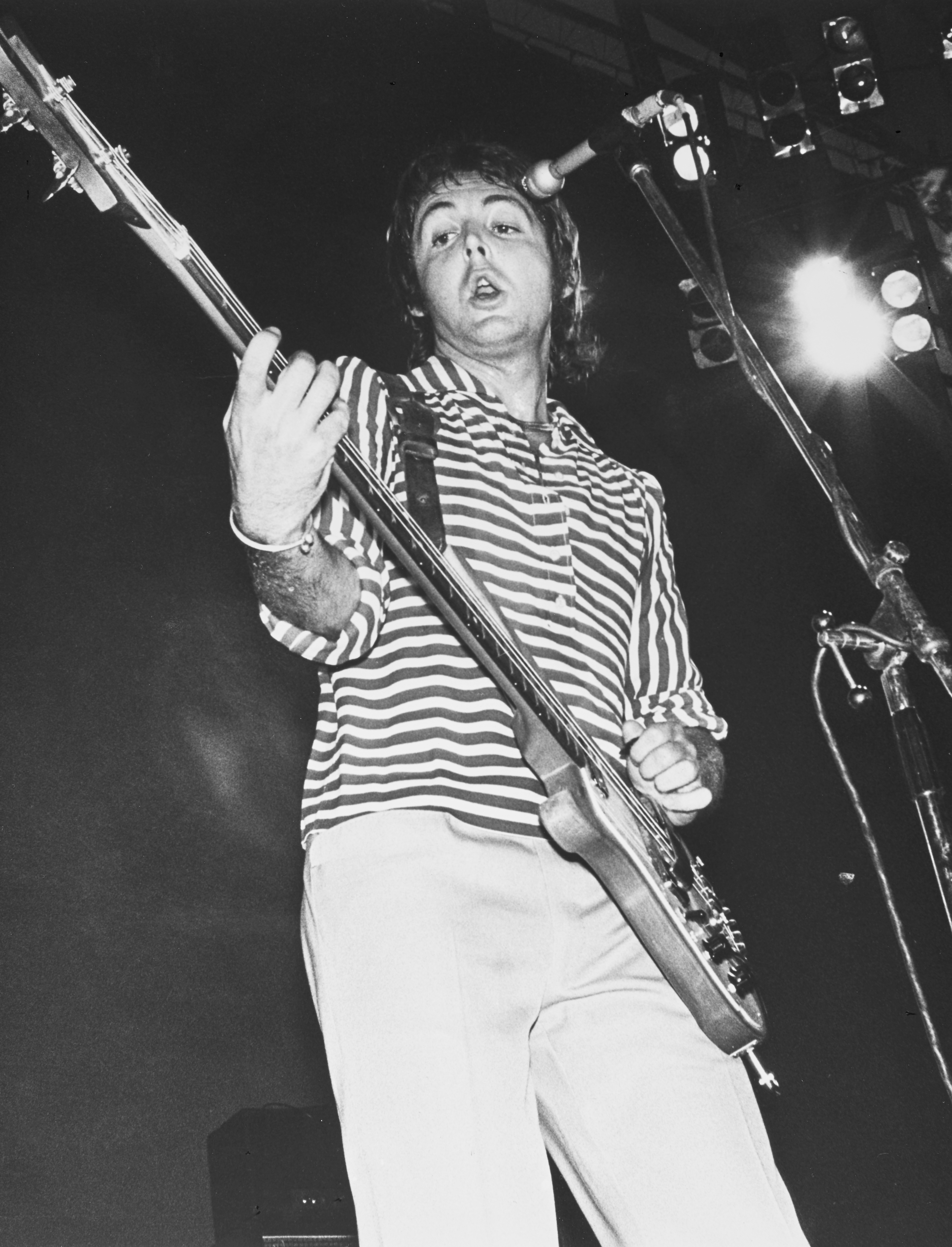
Paul McCartney amassed five number-one hits with Wings, one number-one hit attributed to Paul and Linda McCartney, as well as two number-one hits as a member of the Beatles.

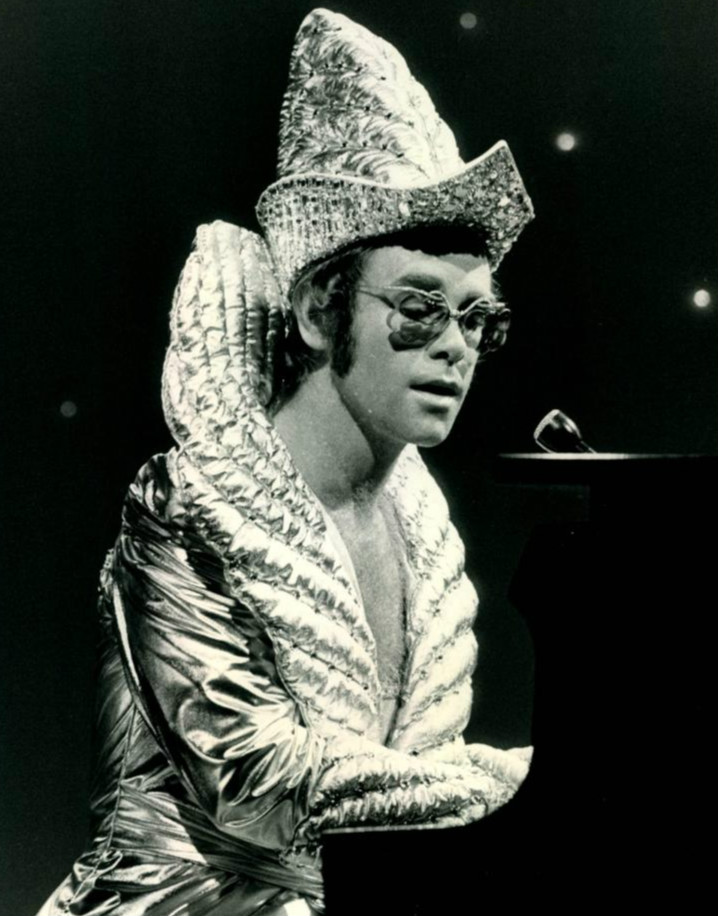
Elton John accumulated six number-one hits on the Hot 100 chart during the 1970s.

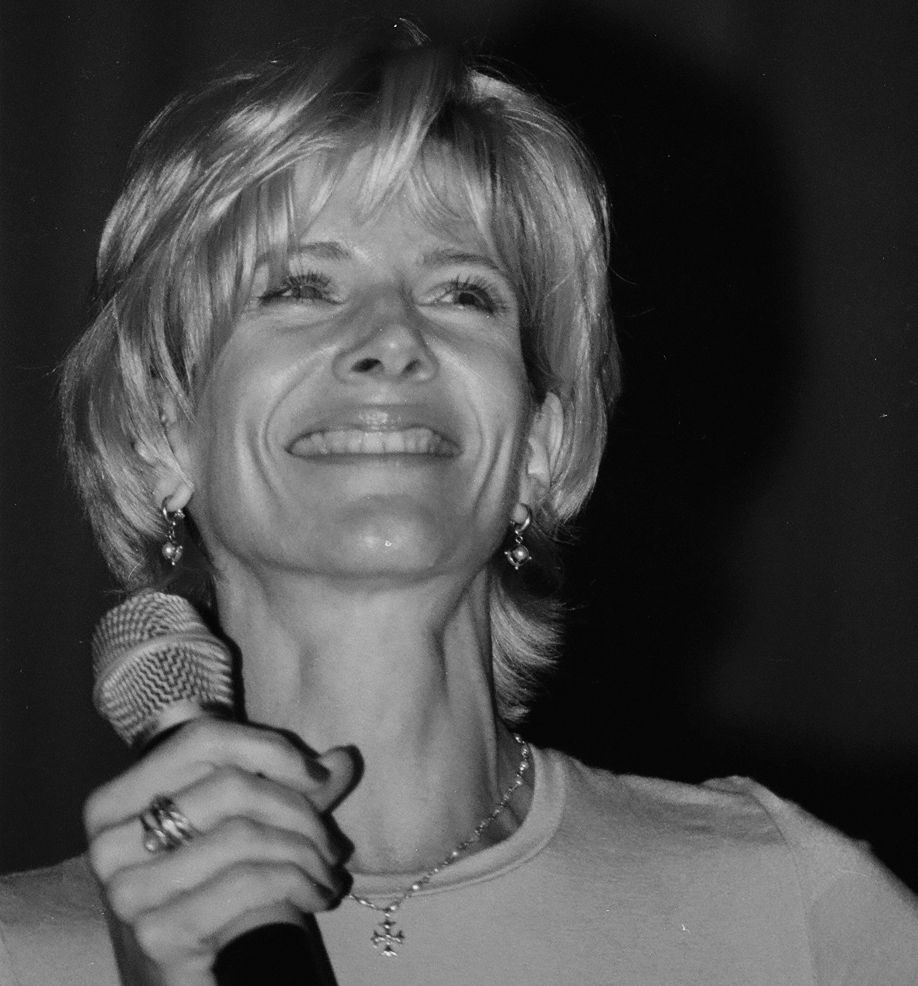
"You Light Up My Life" by Debby Boone was the biggest hit single of the 1970s and the first song in history to top the chart for 10 weeks.

#	Reached number one	Artist(s)	Single	Record label	Weeks at number one	Ref
1970
227	January 3, 1970	B. J. Thomas	"Raindrops Keep Fallin' On My Head"	Scepter	4	
228	January 31, 1970	The Jackson 5	"I Want You Back"	Motown	1	
229	February 7, 1970	Shocking Blue	"Venus"	Colossus	1	
230	February 14, 1970	Sly & the Family Stone	"Thank You (Falettinme Be Mice Elf Agin)" / "Everybody Is a Star"	Epic	2	
231	February 28, 1970	Simon & Garfunkel	"Bridge Over Troubled Water"♪ (1970)	Columbia	6	
232	April 11, 1970	The Beatles	"Let It Be"	Apple	2	
233	April 25, 1970	The Jackson 5	"ABC"	Motown	2	
234	May 9, 1970	The Guess Who	"American Woman" / "No Sugar Tonight"	RCA Victor	3	
235	May 30, 1970	Ray Stevens	"Everything Is Beautiful"	Barnaby	2	
236	June 13, 1970	The Beatles	"The Long and Winding Road" / "For You Blue"	Apple	2	
237	June 27, 1970	The Jackson 5	"The Love You Save"	Motown	2	
238	July 11, 1970	Three Dog Night	"Mama Told Me (Not to Come)"	Dunhill	2	
239	July 25, 1970	The Carpenters	"(They Long to Be) Close to You"	A&M	4	
240	August 22, 1970	Bread	"Make It with You"	Elektra	1	
241	August 29, 1970	Edwin Starr	"War"	Gordy	3	
242	September 19, 1970	Diana Ross	"Ain't No Mountain High Enough"	Motown	3	
243	October 10, 1970	Neil Diamond	"Cracklin' Rosie"	Uni	1	
244	October 17, 1970	The Jackson 5	"I'll Be There"	Motown	5	
245	November 21, 1970	The Partridge Family	"I Think I Love You"	Bell	3	
246	December 12, 1970	Smokey Robinson & the Miracles	"The Tears of a Clown"	Tamla	2	
247	December 26, 1970	George Harrison	"My Sweet Lord" / "Isn't It a Pity"	Apple	4	
1971
248	January 23, 1971	Tony Orlando and Dawn	"Knock Three Times"	Bell	3	
249	February 13, 1971	The Osmonds	"One Bad Apple"	MGM	5	
250	March 20, 1971	Janis Joplin	"Me and Bobby McGee"	Columbia	2	
251	April 3, 1971	The Temptations	"Just My Imagination (Running Away with Me)"	Gordy	2	
252	April 17, 1971	Three Dog Night	"Joy to the World"♪ (1971)	Dunhill	6	
253	May 29, 1971	The Rolling Stones	"Brown Sugar"	Rolling Stones	2	
254	June 12, 1971	The Honey Cone	"Want Ads"	Hot Wax	1	
255	June 19, 1971	Carole King	"It's Too Late" / "I Feel the Earth Move"	Ode	5	
256	July 24, 1971	Paul Revere & the Raiders	"Indian Reservation (The Lament of the Cherokee Reservation Indian)"	Columbia	1	
257	July 31, 1971	James Taylor	"You've Got a Friend"	Warner Bros.	1	
258	August 7, 1971	Bee Gees	"How Can You Mend a Broken Heart"	Atco	4	
259	September 4, 1971	Paul McCartney and Linda McCartney	"Uncle Albert/Admiral Halsey"	Apple	1	
260	September 11, 1971	Donny Osmond	"Go Away Little Girl"	MGM	3	
261	October 2, 1971	Rod Stewart	"Maggie May" / "Reason to Believe"	Mercury	5	
262	November 6, 1971	Cher	"Gypsys, Tramps & Thieves"	Kapp	2	
263	November 20, 1971	Isaac Hayes	"Theme from Shaft"	Enterprise	2	
264	December 4, 1971	Sly and the Family Stone	"Family Affair"	Epic	3	
265	December 25, 1971	Melanie	"Brand New Key"	Neighborhood	3	
1972
266	January 15, 1972	Don McLean	"American Pie"	United Artists	4	
267	February 12, 1972	Al Green	"Let's Stay Together"	Hi	1	
268	February 19, 1972	Nilsson	"Without You"	RCA Victor	4	
269	March 18, 1972	Neil Young	"Heart of Gold"	Reprise	1	
270	March 25, 1972	America	"A Horse with No Name"	Warner Bros.	3	
271	April 15, 1972	Roberta Flack	"The First Time Ever I Saw Your Face"♪ (1972)	Atlantic	6	
272	May 27, 1972	The Chi-Lites	"Oh Girl"	Brunswick	1	
273	June 3, 1972	The Staple Singers	"I'll Take You There"	Stax	1	
274	June 10, 1972	Sammy Davis Jr.	"Candy Man"	MGM	3	
275	July 1, 1972	Neil Diamond	"Song Sung Blue"	Uni	1	
276	July 8, 1972	Bill Withers	"Lean On Me"	Sussex	3	
277	July 29, 1972	Gilbert O'Sullivan	"Alone Again (Naturally)"	MAM	6	
278	August 26, 1972	Looking Glass	"Brandy (You're a Fine Girl)"	Epic	1	
279	September 16, 1972	Three Dog Night	"Black and White"	Dunhill	1	
280	September 23, 1972	Mac Davis	"Baby, Don't Get Hooked on Me"	Columbia	3	
281	October 14, 1972	Michael Jackson	"Ben"	Motown	1	
282	October 21, 1972	Chuck Berry	"My Ding-a-Ling"	Chess	2	
283	November 4, 1972	Johnny Nash	"I Can See Clearly Now"	Epic	4	
284	December 2, 1972	The Temptations	"Papa Was a Rollin' Stone"	Gordy	1	
285	December 9, 1972	Helen Reddy	"I Am Woman"	Capitol	1	
286	December 16, 1972	Billy Paul	"Me and Mrs. Jones"	Philadelphia International	3	
1973
287	January 6, 1973	Carly Simon	"You're So Vain"	Elektra	3	
288	January 27, 1973	Stevie Wonder	"Superstition"	Tamla	1	
289	February 3, 1973	Elton John	"Crocodile Rock"	MCA	3	
290	February 24, 1973	Roberta Flack	"Killing Me Softly with His Song"	Atlantic	5	
291	March 24, 1973	The O'Jays	"Love Train"	Philadelphia International	1	
292	April 7, 1973	Vicki Lawrence	"The Night the Lights Went Out in Georgia"	Bell	2	
293	April 21, 1973	Tony Orlando and Dawn	"Tie a Yellow Ribbon Round the Ole Oak Tree"♪ (1973)	Bell	4	
294	May 19, 1973	Stevie Wonder	"You Are the Sunshine of My Life"	Tamla	1	
295	May 26, 1973	The Edgar Winter Group	"Frankenstein"	Epic	1	
296	June 2, 1973	Paul McCartney and Wings	"My Love"	Apple	4	
297	June 30, 1973	George Harrison	"Give Me Love (Give Me Peace On Earth)"	Apple	1	
298	July 7, 1973	Billy Preston	"Will It Go Round in Circles"	A&M	2	
299	July 21, 1973	Jim Croce	"Bad, Bad Leroy Brown"	ABC	2	
300	August 4, 1973	Maureen McGovern	"The Morning After"	20th Century	2	
301	August 18, 1973	Diana Ross	"Touch Me in the Morning"	Motown	1	
302	August 25, 1973	Stories	"Brother Louie"	Kama Sutra	2	
303	September 8, 1973	Marvin Gaye	"Let's Get It On"	Tamla	2	
304	September 15, 1973	Helen Reddy	"Delta Dawn"	Capitol	1	
305	September 29, 1973	Grand Funk	"We're an American Band"	Capitol	1	
306	October 6, 1973	Cher	"Half-Breed"	MCA	2	
307	October 20, 1973	The Rolling Stones	"Angie"	Rolling Stones	1	
308	October 27, 1973	Gladys Knight & the Pips	"Midnight Train to Georgia"	Buddah	2	
309	November 10, 1973	Eddie Kendricks	"Keep On Truckin'"	Tamla	2	
310	November 24, 1973	Ringo Starr	"Photograph"	Apple	1	
311	December 1, 1973	The Carpenters	"Top of the World"	A&M	2	
312	December 15, 1973	Charlie Rich	"The Most Beautiful Girl"	Epic	2	
313	December 29, 1973	Jim Croce	"Time in a Bottle"	ABC	2	
1974
314	January 12, 1974	Steve Miller Band	"The Joker"	Capitol	1	
315	January 19, 1974	Al Wilson	"Show and Tell"	Rocky Road	1	
316	January 26, 1974	Ringo Starr	"You're Sixteen"	Apple	1	
317	February 2, 1974	Barbra Streisand	"The Way We Were"♪ (1974)	Columbia	3	
318	February 9, 1974	Love Unlimited Orchestra	"Love's Theme"	20th Century	1	
319	March 2, 1974	Terry Jacks	"Seasons in the Sun"	Bell	3	
320	March 23, 1974	Cher	"Dark Lady"	MCA	1	
321	March 30, 1974	John Denver	"Sunshine on My Shoulders"	RCA Victor	1	
322	April 6, 1974	Blue Swede	"Hooked on a Feeling"	EMI	1	
323	April 13, 1974	Elton John	"Bennie and the Jets"	MCA	1	
324	April 20, 1974	MFSB and The Three Degrees	"TSOP"	Philadelphia International	2	
325	May 4, 1974	Grand Funk	"The Loco-Motion"	Capitol	2	
326	May 18, 1974	Ray Stevens	"The Streak"	Barnaby	3	
327	June 8, 1974	Paul McCartney and Wings	"Band on the Run"	Apple	1	
328	June 15, 1974	Bo Donaldson and The Heywoods	"Billy, Don't Be a Hero"	ABC	2	
329	June 29, 1974	Gordon Lightfoot	"Sundown"	Reprise	1	
330	July 6, 1974	The Hues Corporation	"Rock the Boat"	RCA Victor	1	
331	July 13, 1974	George McCrae	"Rock Your Baby"	TK Records	2	
332	July 27, 1974	John Denver	"Annie's Song"	RCA Victor	2	
333	August 10, 1974	Roberta Flack	"Feel Like Makin' Love"	Atlantic	1	
334	August 17, 1974	Paper Lace	"The Night Chicago Died"	Mercury	1	
335	August 24, 1974	Paul Anka and Odia Coates	"(You're) Having My Baby"	United Artists	3	
336	September 14, 1974	Eric Clapton	"I Shot the Sheriff"	RSO	1	
337	September 21, 1974	Barry White	"Can't Get Enough of Your Love, Babe"	20th Century	1	
338	September 28, 1974	Andy Kim	"Rock Me Gently"	Capitol	1	
339	October 5, 1974	Olivia Newton-John	"I Honestly Love You"	MCA	2	
340	October 19, 1974	Billy Preston	"Nothing from Nothing"	A&M	1	
341	October 26, 1974	Dionne Warwick and The Spinners	"Then Came You"	Atlantic	1	
342	November 2, 1974	Stevie Wonder	"You Haven't Done Nothin'"	Tamla	1	
343	November 9, 1974	Bachman-Turner Overdrive	"You Ain't Seen Nothing Yet"	Mercury	1	
344	November 16, 1974	John Lennon	"Whatever Gets You Thru the Night"	Apple	1	
345	November 23, 1974	Billy Swan	"I Can Help"	Monument	2	
346	December 7, 1974	Carl Douglas	"Kung Fu Fighting"	20th Century	2	
347	December 21, 1974	Harry Chapin	"Cat's in the Cradle"	Elektra	1	
348	December 28, 1974	Helen Reddy	"Angie Baby"	Capitol	1	
1975
349	January 4, 1975	Elton John	"Lucy in the Sky with Diamonds"	MCA	2	
350	January 18, 1975	Barry Manilow	"Mandy"	Bell	1	
351	January 25, 1975	The Carpenters	"Please Mr. Postman"	A&M	1	
352	February 1, 1975	Neil Sedaka	"Laughter in the Rain"	Rocket	1	
353	February 8, 1975	Ohio Players	"Fire"	Mercury	1	
354	February 15, 1975	Linda Ronstadt	"You're No Good"	Capitol	1	
355	February 22, 1975	Average White Band	"Pick Up the Pieces"	Atlantic	1	
356	March 1, 1975	Eagles	"Best of My Love"	Asylum	1	
357	March 8, 1975	Olivia Newton-John	"Have You Never Been Mellow"	MCA	1	
358	March 15, 1975	The Doobie Brothers	"Black Water"	Warner Bros.	1	
359	March 22, 1975	Frankie Valli	"My Eyes Adored You"	Private Stock	1	
360	March 29, 1975	LaBelle	"Lady Marmalade"	Epic	1	
361	April 5, 1975	Minnie Riperton	"Lovin' You"	Epic	1	
362	April 12, 1975	Elton John	"Philadelphia Freedom"	MCA	2	
363	April 26, 1975	B. J. Thomas	"(Hey Won't You Play) Another Somebody Done Somebody Wrong Song"	ABC	1	
364	May 3, 1975	Tony Orlando and Dawn	"He Don't Love You (Like I Love You)"	Elektra	3	
365	May 24, 1975	Earth, Wind & Fire	"Shining Star"	Columbia	1	
366	May 31, 1975	Freddy Fender	"Before the Next Teardrop Falls"	ABC Dot	1	
367	June 7, 1975	John Denver	"Thank God I'm a Country Boy"	RCA Victor	1	
368	June 14, 1975	America	"Sister Golden Hair"	Warner Bros.	1	
369	June 21, 1975	Captain & Tennille	"Love Will Keep Us Together"♪ (1975)	A&M	4	
370	July 19, 1975	Paul McCartney and Wings	"Listen to What the Man Said"	Capitol	1	
371	July 26, 1975	Van McCoy and the Soul City Symphony	"The Hustle"	Avco	1	
372	August 2, 1975	Eagles	"One of These Nights"	Asylum	1	
373	August 9, 1975	Bee Gees	"Jive Talkin'"	RSO	2	
374	August 23, 1975	Hamilton, Joe Frank & Reynolds	"Fallin' in Love"	Playboy	1	
375	August 30, 1975	KC and the Sunshine Band	"Get Down Tonight"	TK Records	1	
376	September 6, 1975	Glen Campbell	"Rhinestone Cowboy"	Capitol	2	
377	September 20, 1975	David Bowie	"Fame"	RCA Victor	2	
378	September 27, 1975	John Denver	"I'm Sorry"	RCA Victor	1	
379	October 11, 1975	Neil Sedaka	"Bad Blood"	Rocket	3	
380	November 1, 1975	Elton John	"Island Girl"	MCA	3	
381	November 22, 1975	KC and the Sunshine Band	"That's the Way (I Like It)"	TK Records	2	
382	November 29, 1975	Silver Convention	"Fly, Robin, Fly"	Midland International	3	
383	December 27, 1975	The Staple Singers	"Let's Do It Again"	Curtom	1	
1976
384	January 3, 1976	Bay City Rollers	"Saturday Night"	Arista	1	
385	January 10, 1976	C. W. McCall	"Convoy"	MGM	1	
386	January 17, 1976	Barry Manilow	"I Write the Songs"	Arista	1	
387	January 24, 1976	Diana Ross	"Theme from Mahogany (Do You Know Where You're Going To)"	Motown	1	
388	January 31, 1976	Ohio Players	"Love Rollercoaster"	Mercury	1	
389	February 7, 1976	Paul Simon	"50 Ways to Leave Your Lover"	Columbia	3	
390	February 28, 1976	Rhythm Heritage	"Theme From S.W.A.T."	ABC	1	
391	March 6, 1976	The Miracles	"Love Machine"	Tamla	1	
392	March 13, 1976	The Four Seasons	"December 1963 (Oh, What a Night)"	Warner / Curb	3	
393	April 3, 1976	Johnnie Taylor	"Disco Lady"	Columbia	4	
394	May 1, 1976	The Bellamy Brothers	"Let Your Love Flow"	Warner / Curb	1	
395	May 8, 1976	John Sebastian	"Welcome Back"	Reprise	1	
396	May 15, 1976	The Sylvers	"Boogie Fever"	Capitol	1	
397	May 22, 1976	Wings	"Silly Love Songs"♪ (1976)	Capitol	5	
398	May 29, 1976	Diana Ross	"Love Hangover"	Motown	2	
399	July 10, 1976	Starland Vocal Band	"Afternoon Delight"	Windsong	2	
400	July 24, 1976	The Manhattans	"Kiss and Say Goodbye"	Columbia	2	
401	August 7, 1976	Elton John and Kiki Dee	"Don't Go Breaking My Heart"	Rocket	4	
402	September 4, 1976	Bee Gees	"You Should Be Dancing"	RSO	1	
403	September 11, 1976	KC and the Sunshine Band	"(Shake, Shake, Shake) Shake Your Booty"	TK Records	1	
404	September 18, 1976	Wild Cherry	"Play That Funky Music"	Epic	3	
405	October 9, 1976	Walter Murphy and the Big Apple Band	"A Fifth of Beethoven"	Private Stock	1	
406	October 16, 1976	Rick Dees and His Cast of Idiots	"Disco Duck"	RSO	1	
407	October 23, 1976	Chicago	"If You Leave Me Now"	Columbia	2	
408	November 6, 1976	Steve Miller Band	"Rock'n Me"	Capitol	1	
409	November 13, 1976	Rod Stewart	"Tonight's the Night (Gonna Be Alright)"♪ (1977)	Warner Bros.	8	
1977
410	January 8, 1977	Marilyn McCoo and Billy Davis, Jr.	"You Don't Have to Be a Star (To Be in My Show)"	ABC	1	
411	January 15, 1977	Leo Sayer	"You Make Me Feel Like Dancing"	Warner Bros.	1	
412	January 22, 1977	Stevie Wonder	"I Wish"	Tamla	1	
413	January 29, 1977	Rose Royce	"Car Wash"	MCA	1	
414	February 5, 1977	Mary MacGregor	"Torn Between Two Lovers"	Ariola America	2	
415	February 19, 1977	Manfred Mann's Earth Band	"Blinded by the Light"	Warner Bros.	1	
416	February 26, 1977	Eagles	"New Kid in Town"	Asylum	1	
417	March 5, 1977	Barbra Streisand	"Love Theme From A Star Is Born (Evergreen)"	Columbia	3	
418	March 26, 1977	Daryl Hall and John Oates	"Rich Girl"	RCA	2	
419	April 9, 1977	ABBA	"Dancing Queen"	Atlantic	1	
420	April 16, 1977	David Soul	"Don't Give Up on Us"	Private Stock	1	
421	April 23, 1977	Thelma Houston	"Don't Leave Me This Way"	Tamla	1	
422	April 30, 1977	Glen Campbell	"Southern Nights"	Capitol	1	
423	May 7, 1977	Eagles	"Hotel California"	Asylum	1	
424	May 14, 1977	Leo Sayer	"When I Need You"	Warner Bros.	1	
425	May 21, 1977	Stevie Wonder	"Sir Duke"	Tamla	3	
426	June 11, 1977	KC and the Sunshine Band	"I'm Your Boogie Man"	TK Records	1	
427	June 18, 1977	Fleetwood Mac	"Dreams"	Warner Bros.	1	
428	June 25, 1977	Marvin Gaye	"Got to Give It Up (Part 1)"	Tamla	1	
429	July 2, 1977	Bill Conti	"Gonna Fly Now (Theme From Rocky)"	United Artists	1	
430	July 9, 1977	Alan O'Day	"Undercover Angel"	Pacific	1	
431	July 16, 1977	Shaun Cassidy	"Da Doo Ron Ron"	Warner / Curb	1	
432	July 23, 1977	Barry Manilow	"Looks Like We Made It"	Arista	1	
433	July 30, 1977	Andy Gibb	"I Just Want to Be Your Everything"	RSO	4	
434	August 20, 1977	The Emotions	"Best of My Love"	Columbia	5	
435	October 1, 1977	Meco	"Star Wars Theme/Cantina Band"	Millennium	2	
436	October 15, 1977	Debby Boone	"You Light Up My Life"	Warner / Curb	10	
437	December 24, 1977	Bee Gees	"How Deep Is Your Love"	RSO	3	
1978
438	January 14, 1978	Player	"Baby Come Back"	RSO	3	
439	February 4, 1978	Bee Gees	"Stayin' Alive"	RSO	4	
440	March 4, 1978	Andy Gibb	"(Love Is) Thicker Than Water"	RSO	2	
441	March 18, 1978	Bee Gees	"Night Fever"	RSO	8	
442	May 13, 1978	Yvonne Elliman	"If I Can't Have You"	RSO	1	
443	May 20, 1978	Wings	"With a Little Luck"	Capitol	2	
444	June 3, 1978	Johnny Mathis and Deniece Williams	"Too Much, Too Little, Too Late"	Columbia	1	
445	June 10, 1978	John Travolta and Olivia Newton-John	"You're the One That I Want"	RSO	1	
446	June 17, 1978	Andy Gibb	"Shadow Dancing"♪ (1978)	RSO	7	
447	August 5, 1978	The Rolling Stones	"Miss You"	Rolling Stones	1	
448	August 12, 1978	Commodores	"Three Times a Lady"	Motown	2	
449	August 26, 1978	Frankie Valli	"Grease"	RSO	2	
450	September 9, 1978	A Taste of Honey	"Boogie Oogie Oogie"	Capitol	3	
451	September 30, 1978	Exile	"Kiss You All Over"	Warner / Curb	4	
452	October 28, 1978	Nick Gilder	"Hot Child in the City"	Chrysalis	1	
453	November 4, 1978	Anne Murray	"You Needed Me"	Capitol	1	
454	November 11, 1978	Donna Summer	"MacArthur Park"	Casablanca	3	
455	December 2, 1978	Barbra Streisand and Neil Diamond	"You Don't Bring Me Flowers"	Columbia	2	
456	December 9, 1978	Chic	"Le Freak"	Atlantic	6	
1979
457	January 6, 1979	Bee Gees	"Too Much Heaven"	RSO	2	
458	February 10, 1979	Rod Stewart	"Da Ya Think I'm Sexy?"	Warner Bros.	4	
459	March 10, 1979	Gloria Gaynor	"I Will Survive"	Polydor	3	
460	March 24, 1979	Bee Gees	"Tragedy"	RSO	2	
461	April 14, 1979	The Doobie Brothers	"What a Fool Believes"	Warner Bros.	1	
462	April 21, 1979	Amii Stewart	"Knock on Wood"	Ariola America	1	
463	April 28, 1979	Blondie	"Heart of Glass"	Chrysalis	1	
464	May 5, 1979	Peaches & Herb	"Reunited"	Polydor	4	
465	June 2, 1979	Donna Summer	"Hot Stuff"	Casablanca	3	
466	June 9, 1979	Bee Gees	"Love You Inside Out"	RSO	1	
467	June 30, 1979	Anita Ward	"Ring My Bell"	Juana	2	
468	July 14, 1979	Donna Summer	"Bad Girls"	Casablanca	5	
469	August 18, 1979	Chic	"Good Times"	Atlantic	1	
470	August 25, 1979	The Knack	"My Sharona"♪ (1979)	Capitol	6	
471	October 6, 1979	Robert John	"Sad Eyes"	EMI America	1	
472	October 13, 1979	Michael Jackson	"Don't Stop 'til You Get Enough"	Epic	1	
473	October 20, 1979	Herb Alpert	"Rise"	A&M	2	
474	November 3, 1979	M	"Pop Muzik"	Sire	1	
475	November 10, 1979	Eagles	"Heartache Tonight"	Asylum	1	
476	November 17, 1979	Commodores	"Still"	Motown	1	
477	November 24, 1979	Barbra Streisand and Donna Summer	"No More Tears (Enough Is Enough)"	Columbia / Casablanca	2	
478	December 8, 1979	Styx	"Babe"	A&M	2	
479	December 22, 1979	Rupert Holmes	"Escape (The Piña Colada Song)"	Infinity	3	

== Statistics by decade ==
=== By artist ===
The following artists achieved four or more number-one hits during the 1970s.

Artist	Number-one hits
Bee Gees	9
Elton John	6
Stevie Wonder	5
Paul McCartney and Wings	5
Eagles	5
The Jackson 5	4
Diana Ross	4
John Denver	4
KC and the Sunshine Band	4
Barbra Streisand	4
Donna Summer	4

=== Artists by total number of weeks at number-one ===
The following artists were featured in top of the chart for the highest total number of weeks during the 1970s.

Artist	Weeks at number one
Bee Gees	27
Rod Stewart	17
Elton John	15
Paul McCartney and Wings	13
Andy Gibb	13
Donna Summer	13
Roberta Flack	12
The Jackson 5	10
Tony Orlando and Dawn	10
Barbra Streisand	10
Debby Boone	10
Three Dog Night	9

=== Songs by total number of weeks at number one ===
The following songs were featured in top of the chart for the highest total number of weeks during the 1970s.

Weeks at number one	Song	Artist(s)
10	"You Light Up My Life"	Debby Boone
8	"Night Fever"	Bee Gees
8	"Tonight's the Night (Gonna Be Alright)"	Rod Stewart
7	"Shadow Dancing"	Andy Gibb
6	"Bridge over Troubled Water"	Simon & Garfunkel
6	"Joy to the World"	Three Dog Night
6	"The First Time Ever I Saw Your Face"	Roberta Flack
6	"Alone Again (Naturally)"	Gilbert O'Sullivan
6	"Le Freak"	Chic
6	"My Sharona"	The Knack
5	"I'll Be There"	The Jackson 5
5	"One Bad Apple"	The Osmonds
5	"It's Too Late" / "I Feel the Earth Move"	Carole King
5	"Maggie May" / "Reason to Believe"	Rod Stewart
5	"Killing Me Softly With His Song"	Roberta Flack
5	"Silly Love Songs"	Wings
5	"Best of My Love"	The Emotions
5	"Bad Girls"	Donna Summer

== See also ==
- List of UK Singles Chart number ones of the 1970s
- List of number-one hits (United States)
- 1970s in music
