= List of Cash Box Top 100 number-one singles of 1974 =

These are the Top 100 singles of 1974 from Cash Box magazine. A whopping 48 singles reached No. 1 in 1974.

Issue date	Song	Artist
January 5	"Leave Me Alone (Ruby Red Dress)"	Helen Reddy
January 12	"Time in a Bottle"	Jim Croce
January 19	"The Joker"	Steve Miller Band
January 26	"Show and Tell"	Al Wilson
February 2	"You're Sixteen"	Ringo Starr
February 9	"The Way We Were"	Barbra Streisand
February 16	"The Americans"	Byron MacGregor
February 23	"Love's Theme"	Love Unlimited Orchestra
March 2	"Seasons in the Sun"	Terry Jacks
March 9	"Seasons in the Sun"	Terry Jacks
March 16	"Boogie Down"	Eddie Kendricks
March 23	"Rock On"	David Essex
March 30	"Sunshine on My Shoulders"	John Denver
April 6	"Hooked on a Feeling"	Blue Swede
April 13	"Bennie and the Jets"	Elton John
April 20	"TSOP (The Sound of Philadelphia)"	MFSB featuring The Three Degrees
April 27	"TSOP (The Sound of Philadelphia)"	MFSB featuring The Three Degrees
May 4	"The Loco-Motion"	Grand Funk
May 11	"The Show Must Go On"	Three Dog Night
May 18	"Dancing Machine"	The Jackson 5
May 25	"The Streak"	Ray Stevens
June 1	"The Entertainer"	Marvin Hamlisch
June 8	"Band on the Run"	Paul McCartney and Wings
June 15	"Band on the Run"	Paul McCartney and Wings
June 22	"You Make Me Feel Brand New"	The Stylistics
June 29	"Sundown"	Gordon Lightfoot
July 6	"Billy Don't Be a Hero"	Bo Donaldson and the Heywoods
July 13	"Rock the Boat"	The Hues Corporation
July 20	"Rock Your Baby"	George McCrae
July 27	"Annie's Song"	John Denver
August 3	"Don't Let the Sun Go Down on Me"	Elton John
August 10	"The Night Chicago Died"	Paper Lace
August 17	"Feel Like Makin' Love"	Roberta Flack
August 24	"(You're) Having My Baby"	Paul Anka and Odia Coates
August 31	"Tell Me Something Good"	Rufus
September 7	"I Shot the Sheriff"	Eric Clapton
September 14	"Can't Get Enough of Your Love, Babe"	Barry White
September 21	"I Honestly Love You"	Olivia Newton-John
September 28	"Rock Me Gently"	Andy Kim
October 5	"Then Came You"	Dionne Warwick and Spinners
October 12	"Nothing from Nothing"	Billy Preston
October 19	"I Honestly Love You"	Olivia Newton-John
October 26	"Can't Get Enough"	Bad Company
November 2	"You Haven't Done Nothin'"	Stevie Wonder
November 9	"Jazzman"	Carole King
November 16	"Whatever Gets You thru the Night"	John Lennon
November 23	"You Ain't Seen Nothing Yet"	Bachman-Turner Overdrive
November 30	"I Can Help"	Billy Swan
December 7	"When Will I See You Again"	The Three Degrees
December 14	"Kung Fu Fighting"	Carl Douglas
December 21	"Angie Baby"	Helen Reddy
December 28	"Cat's in the Cradle"	Harry Chapin

== See also ==
- 1974 in music
- Hot 100 number-one hits of 1974 (USA) by Billboard magazine
- RPM number-one hits of 1974 for the #1 hits in Canada
