= List of number-one singles in 1974 (New Zealand) =

This is a list of number-one hit singles in 1974 in New Zealand, starting with the first chart dated, 25 January 1974.

== Chart ==
Key
‡ – Single of New Zealand origin

Week	Artist	Title
4 January 1974	Summer break - no chart	Summer break - no chart
11 January 1974	Summer break - no chart	Summer break - no chart
18 January 1974	Summer break - no chart	Summer break - no chart
25 January 1974	David Bowie	"Sorrow"
1 February 1974	David Bowie	"Sorrow"
8 February 1974	David Bowie	"Sorrow"
15 February 1974	Elton John	"Goodbye Yellow Brick Road"
22 February 1974	Ringo Starr	"You're Sixteen"
1 March 1974	Ringo Starr	"You're Sixteen"
8 March 1974	George Baker Selection	"Baby Blue"
15 March 1974	George Baker Selection	"Baby Blue"
21 March 1974	George Baker Selection	"Baby Blue"
28 March 1974	George Baker Selection	"Baby Blue"
3 April 1974	George Baker Selection	"Baby Blue"
12 April 1974	The Hollies	"The Air That I Breathe"
19 April 1974	The Hollies	"The Air That I Breathe"
26 April 1974	The Hollies	"The Air That I Breathe"
3 May 1974	The Hollies	"The Air That I Breathe"
10 May 1974	The Hollies	"The Air That I Breathe"
17 May 1974	The Hollies	"The Air That I Breathe"
24 May 1974	Terry Jacks	"Seasons In The Sun"
31 May 1974	Terry Jacks	"Seasons In The Sun"
7 June 1974	Terry Jacks	"Seasons In The Sun"
14 June 1974	Ray Stevens	"The Streak"
21 June 1974	Ray Stevens	"The Streak"
28 June 1974	Ray Stevens	"The Streak"
5 July 1974	Ray Stevens	"The Streak"
12 July 1974	Ray Stevens	"The Streak"
19 July 1974	Ray Stevens	"The Streak"
26 July 1974	Paul McCartney & Wings	"Band On The Run"
3 August 1974	Paul McCartney & Wings	"Band On The Run"
10 August 1974	Paul McCartney & Wings	"Band On The Run"
17 August 1974	Paul McCartney & Wings	"Band On The Run"
23 August 1974	Paper Lace	"The Night Chicago Died"
30 August 1974	Paper Lace	"The Night Chicago Died"
6 September 1974	Paper Lace	"The Night Chicago Died"
13 September 1974	Paper Lace	"The Night Chicago Died"
20 September 1974	Paper Lace	"The Night Chicago Died"
27 September 1974	The Drifters	"Kissin' in the Back Row of the Movies"
4 October 1974	The Drifters	"Kissin' in the Back Row of the Movies"
11 October 1974	The Drifters	"Kissin' in the Back Row of the Movies"
18 October 1974	Eric Clapton	"I Shot the Sheriff"
25 October 1974	Eric Clapton	"I Shot the Sheriff"
1 November 1974	The Drifters	"Kissin' in the Back Row of the Movies"
8 November 1974	Space Waltz	"Out on the Street"^{‡}
15 November 1974	Space Waltz	"Out on the Street"^{‡}
22 November 1974	Carl Douglas	"Kung Fu Fighting"
29 November 1974	Carl Douglas	"Kung Fu Fighting"
6 December 1974	Carl Douglas	"Kung Fu Fighting"
13 December 1974	Carl Douglas	"Kung Fu Fighting"
20 December 1974	Bachman–Turner Overdrive	"You Ain't Seen Nothing Yet"
27 December 1974	Summer break - no chart	Summer break - no chart
