= List of number-one singles of 1974 (Canada) =

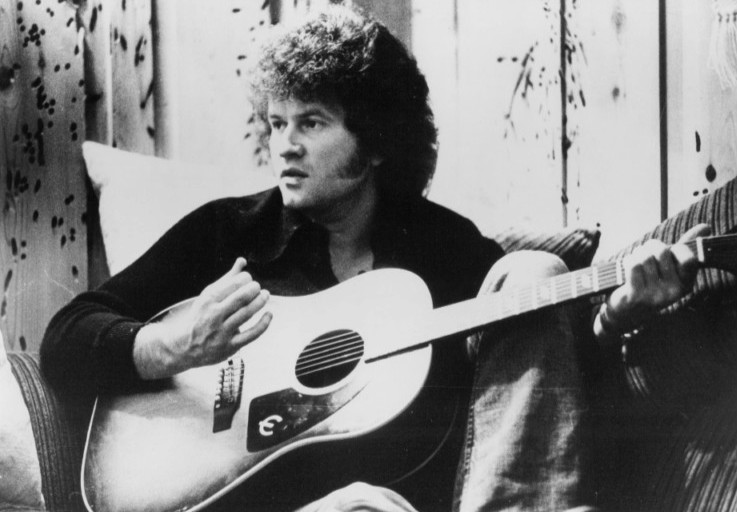
Terry Jacks, formerly of the band The Poppy Family, reached number one for four weeks with "Seasons in the Sun", which became the number-one year-end single for 1974

RPM was a Canadian music magazine that published the best-performing singles chart in Canada from 1964 to 2000. In 1974, thirty-four singles reached number one in Canada. The first number one single was "The Most Beautiful Girl" by the American country singer Charlie Rich, which reached number one in December 1973, and the last was "Kung Fu Fighting" by the Jamaican singer Carl Douglas. Twenty acts had their first number-one on the chart, such as Terry Jacks (formerly of the Poppy Family), Barbra Streisand, Love Unlimited Orchestra, Jim Stafford, John Denver, David Essex, MFSB, the Three Degrees, Grand Funk Railroad, Marvin Hamlisch, Paul McCartney and Wings, Bo Donaldson and The Heywoods, The Hues Corporation, George McCrae, Paul Anka, Eric Clapton, Cat Stevens, Olivia Newton-John, the First Class and Bachman–Turner Overdrive. Six Canadian acts, Terry Jacks, Gordon Lightfoot, Anne Murray, Andy Kim, Paul Anka and Bachman-Turner Overdrive, had one number-one song each in the chart that year.

The longest-running number-one and best-performing single of the year was a version of "Seasons in the Sun" recorded by Terry Jacks, formerly of the Poppy Family, which spent four weeks at number one from the week of January 26 to the week of February 16. English rock musician Elton John had the most weeks at number one and the most number-one singles, totalling five weeks with "Bennie and the Jets", "Don't Let the Sun Go Down on Me" and "The Bitch Is Back". Gordon Lightfoot, Bachman–Turner Overdrive and Bobby Vinton had a total of three weeks each at number one with "Sundown", "You Ain't Seen Nothing Yet" and "My Melody of Love" respectively. American folk singer-songwriter Jim Croce had two weeks at number one with the posthumous hit "Time in a Bottle", which was released as a single after his death in a plane crash in 1973. Nine acts, Anne Murray, John Denver, MFSB, the Three Seasons, Grand Funk Railroad, The Hues Corporation, Eric Clapton, Cat Stevens and Carl Douglas, also had two weeks each at number one.

== Chart history ==
Key
The yellow background indicates the #1 song on RPM's year-end top 200 singles chart of 1974.

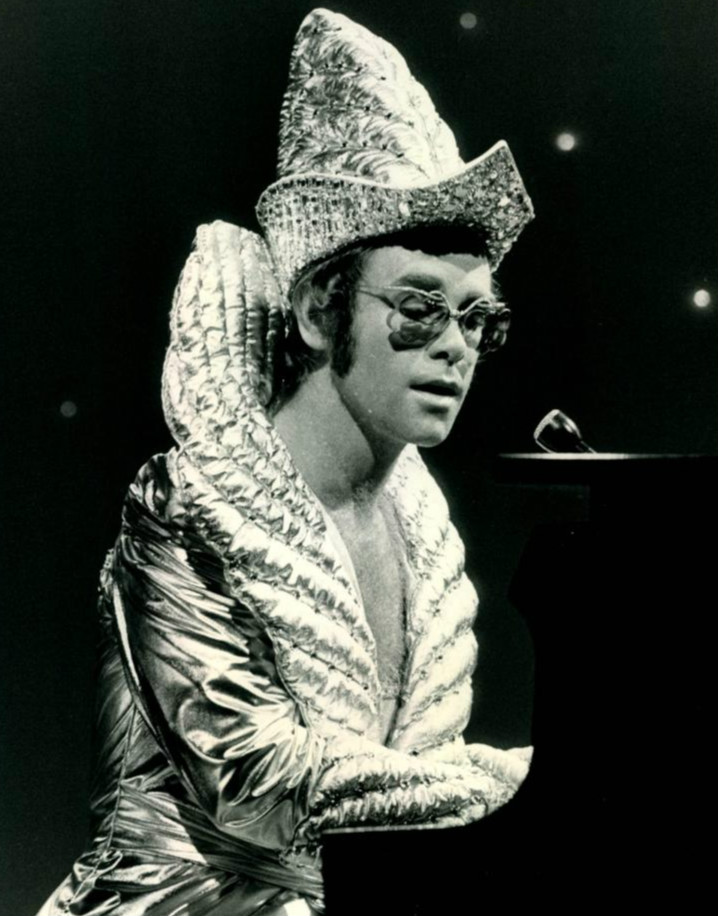
Elton John totalled five weeks at number one with "Bennie and the Jets", "Don't Let the Sun Go Down on Me" and "The Bitch Is Back".

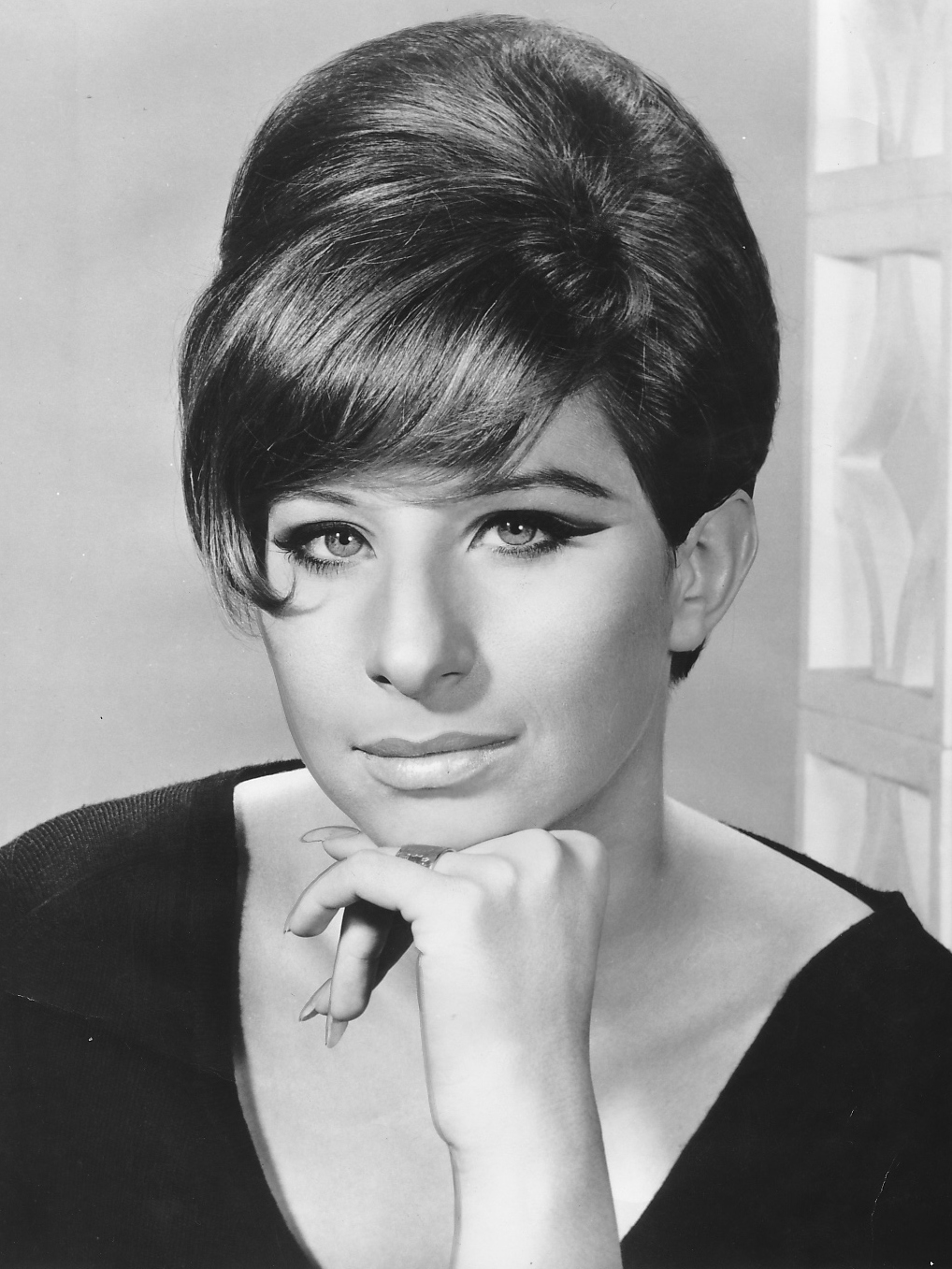
Barbra Streisand charted her first Canada number-one single with "The Way We Were".

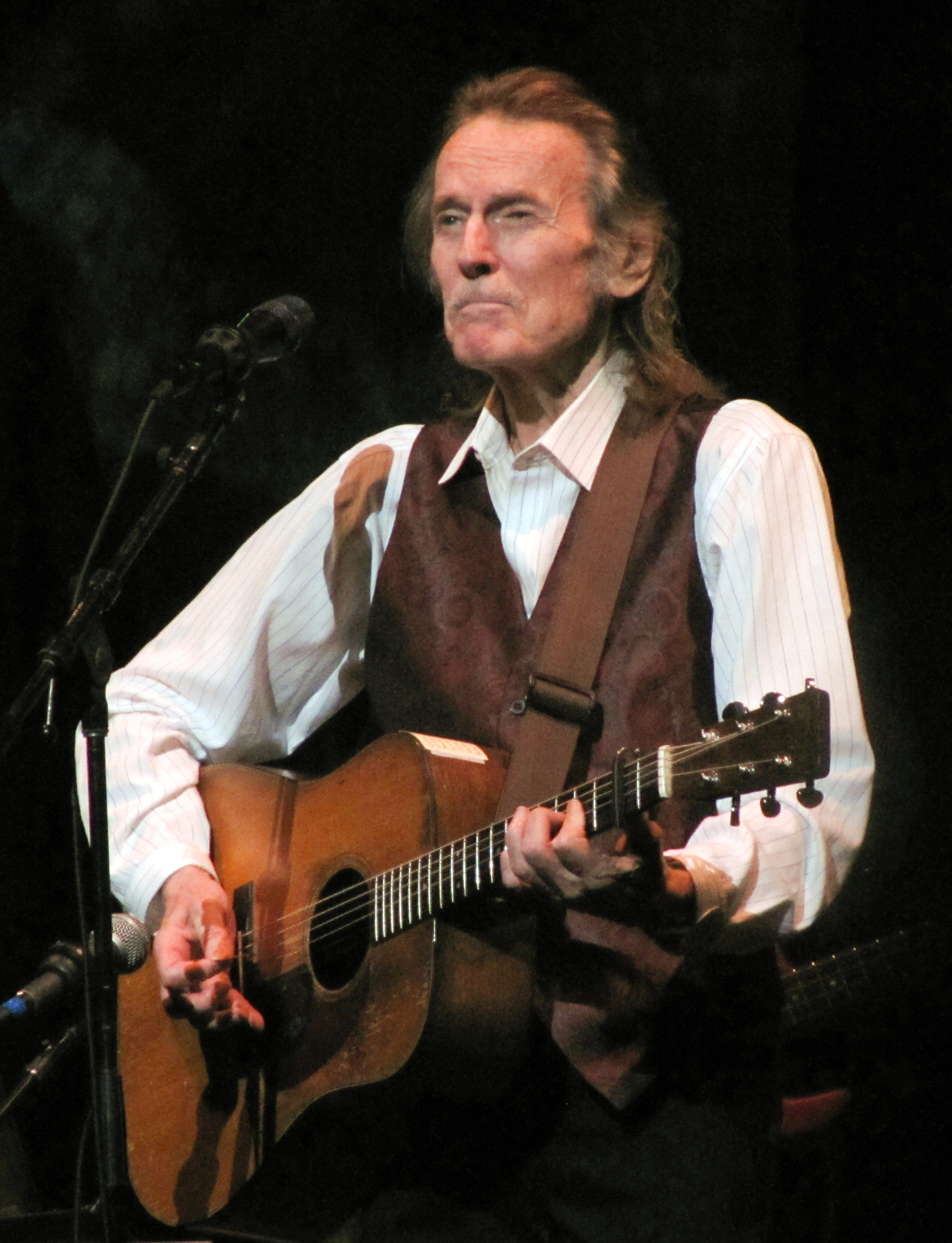
Gordon Lightfoot (pictured in 2009) spent three weeks in June 1974 at number one with "Sundown", his second number-one after "If You Could Read My Mind".

Chart history
Issue date	Title	Artist(s)	Ref.
January 5 (Note: Due to a week's break in publication for the 1973/1974 Christmas and New Year period, the week of January 5 is inferred.)	"The Most Beautiful Girl"	Charlie Rich	
January 12	"Time in a Bottle"	Jim Croce	
January 19	"Time in a Bottle"	Jim Croce	
January 26	"Seasons in the Sun"	Terry Jacks	
February 2	"Seasons in the Sun"	Terry Jacks	
February 9	"Seasons in the Sun"	Terry Jacks	
February 16	"Seasons in the Sun"	Terry Jacks	
February 23	"The Way We Were"	Barbra Streisand	
March 2	"Love's Theme"	Love Unlimited Orchestra	
March 9	"Spiders & Snakes"	Jim Stafford	
March 16	"A Love Song"	Anne Murray	
March 23	"A Love Song"	Anne Murray	
March 30	"Rock On"	David Essex	
April 6	"Sunshine on My Shoulders"	John Denver	
April 13	"Bennie and the Jets"	Elton John	
April 20	"Bennie and the Jets"	Elton John	
April 27	"TSOP (The Sound of Philadelphia)"	MFSB featuring The Three Degrees	
May 4 (Note: No issue was published for May 4, so this week is inferred.)	"TSOP (The Sound of Philadelphia)"	MFSB featuring The Three Degrees	
May 11	"The Loco-Motion"	Grand Funk	
May 18	"The Loco-Motion"	Grand Funk	
May 25	"The Entertainer"	Marvin Hamlisch	
June 1	"The Streak"	Ray Stevens	
June 8	"Band on the Run"	Paul McCartney and Wings	
June 15	"Sundown"	Gordon Lightfoot	
June 22	"Sundown"	Gordon Lightfoot	
June 29	"Sundown"	Gordon Lightfoot	
July 6	"Billy Don't Be a Hero"	Bo Donaldson and The Heywoods	
July 13	"Rock the Boat"	The Hues Corporation	
July 20	"Rock the Boat"	The Hues Corporation	
July 27	"Rock Your Baby"	George McCrae	
August 3	"Annie's Song"	John Denver	
August 10	"Don't Let the Sun Go Down on Me"	Elton John	
August 17	"Don't Let the Sun Go Down on Me"	Elton John	
August 24	"Feel Like Makin' Love"	Roberta Flack	
August 31	"(You're) Having My Baby"	Paul Anka	
September 7	"I Shot the Sheriff"	Eric Clapton	
September 14	"I Shot the Sheriff"	Eric Clapton	
September 21	"Rock Me Gently"	Andy Kim	
September 28	"Another Saturday Night"	Cat Stevens	
October 5	"I Honestly Love You"	Olivia Newton-John	
October 12	"Beach Baby"	The First Class	
October 19	"Another Saturday Night"	Cat Stevens	
October 26	"You Haven't Done Nothin'"	Stevie Wonder	
November 2	"The Bitch Is Back"	Elton John	
November 9	"You Ain't Seen Nothing Yet"	Bachman–Turner Overdrive	
November 16	"You Ain't Seen Nothing Yet"	Bachman–Turner Overdrive	
November 23	"You Ain't Seen Nothing Yet"	Bachman–Turner Overdrive	
November 30	"My Melody of Love"	Bobby Vinton	
December 7	"My Melody of Love"	Bobby Vinton	
December 14	"My Melody of Love"	Bobby Vinton	
December 21	"Kung Fu Fighting"	Carl Douglas	
December 28	"Kung Fu Fighting"	Carl Douglas	

== See also ==
- List of RPM number-one easy listening singles of 1974
- List of RPM number-one country singles of 1974
- List of Billboard Hot 100 number ones of 1974
- List of Cashbox Top 100 number-one singles of 1974
