= List of Billboard Hot 100 number ones of 1974 =

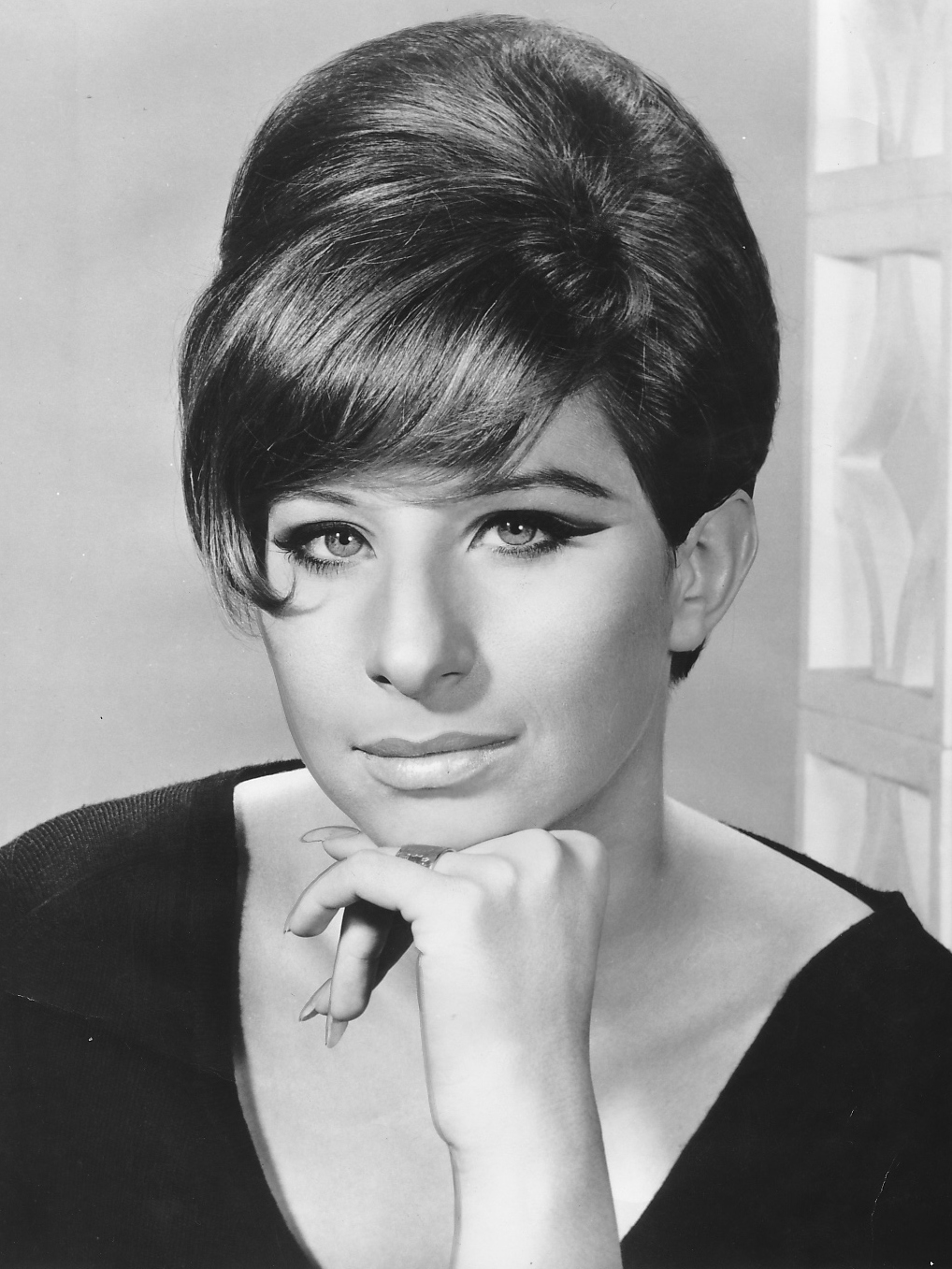
Barbra Streisand scored a number one hit in 1974 with "The Way We Were" from the film of the same name.

The Billboard Hot 100 is a chart published since August 1958 by Billboard magazine which ranks the best-performing singles in the United States. In 1974, it was compiled based on a combination of sales and airplay data sourced from surveys of retail outlets and playlists submitted by radio stations, respectively. During the year, 36 different singles spent time at number one, the most in the chart's history to that point.

In the issue of Billboard dated January 5, Jim Croce was at number one with "Time in a Bottle", retaining the top spot from the final chart of 1973. A week later, it was displaced by "The Joker" by the Steve Miller Band, the first Hot 100 number one for the group. In February, Barbra Streisand topped the chart for the first time. She had first reached number one on Billboard's Pop-Standard Singles chart (later variously known as Easy Listening and Adult Contemporary) in 1964, but it was a further ten years before she reached the peak position on the Hot 100 with "The Way We Were". The song was taken from the soundtrack of the film of the same name, in which she starred. Streisand is one of the best-selling recording artists of all time, with reported sales of 200 million records worldwide, and is one of a select group of entertainers to have won Emmy, Grammy, Oscar, and Tony awards. "The Way We Were" spent three non-consecutive weeks at number one, being displaced for a single week by "Love's Theme" by the Love Unlimited Orchestra, another first-time chart-topper. Barry White, who had assembled and led the Love Unlimited Orchestra, gained his first number one under his own name in September with "Can't Get Enough of Your Love, Babe". In the issue dated March 2, "The Way We Were" was replaced at number one by "Seasons in the Sun" by Terry Jacks, the first and only chart-topper for the Canadian singer. "Seasons in the Sun" held the top spot for three consecutive weeks; no single spent longer at number one during 1974.

John Denver gained his first number one when "Sunshine on My Shoulders" topped the chart in the issue dated March 30. Denver returned to the top spot in late July with "Annie's Song"; he was the only act with more than one number one in 1974. "The Streak" by Ray Stevens was the second single of 1974 to spend three consecutive weeks at number one and the third to spend three weeks in total in the top spot, beginning in the issue dated May 18. On the chart dated June 15, Bo Donaldson and The Heywoods reached number one for the first and only time with "Billy Don't Be a Hero". The original version of the song by the British band Paper Lace had been a number one in the United Kingdom earlier in the year; although that recording had only reached number 96 on the Hot 100, Paper Lace gained its first U.S. number one in August with "The Night Chicago Died". The third number one of the year to spend three consecutive weeks in the peak position was "(You're) Having My Baby" by Paul Anka and Odia Coates; it was Anka's first number one since 1959 and the first of Coates's career, achieved with her first single to enter the Hot 100. Other acts to earn their first number one in 1974 were Al Wilson, Blue Swede, MFSB, the Three Degrees, Gordon Lightfoot, the Hues Corporation, George McCrae, Eric Clapton, Andy Kim, Olivia Newton-John, Dionne Warwick, the Spinners, Bachman–Turner Overdrive, Billy Swan, Carl Douglas, and Harry Chapin. After George Harrison had his first solo number one in 1970, Paul McCartney in 1971, and Ringo Starr in 1973, John Lennon became the final former member of the Beatles to top the Hot 100 as a soloist when "Whatever Gets You thru the Night" spent a single week atop the listing in November. His next solo number one in the United States did not occur until after his murder in 1980.

== Chart history ==
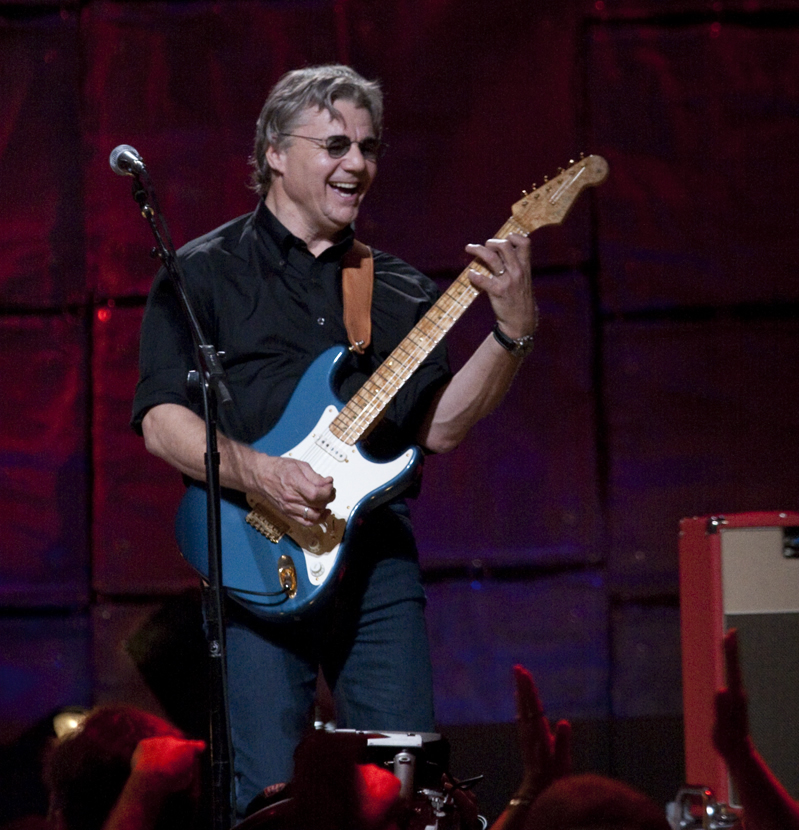
The Steve Miller Band (Miller pictured in 2010) topped the Hot 100 for the first time in January 1974.

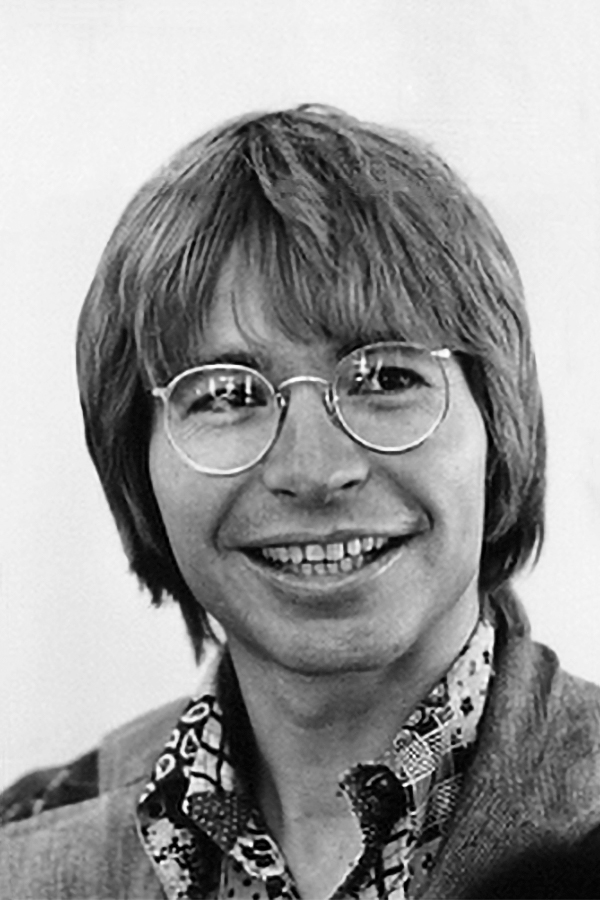
John Denver was the only act with more than one number one in 1974.

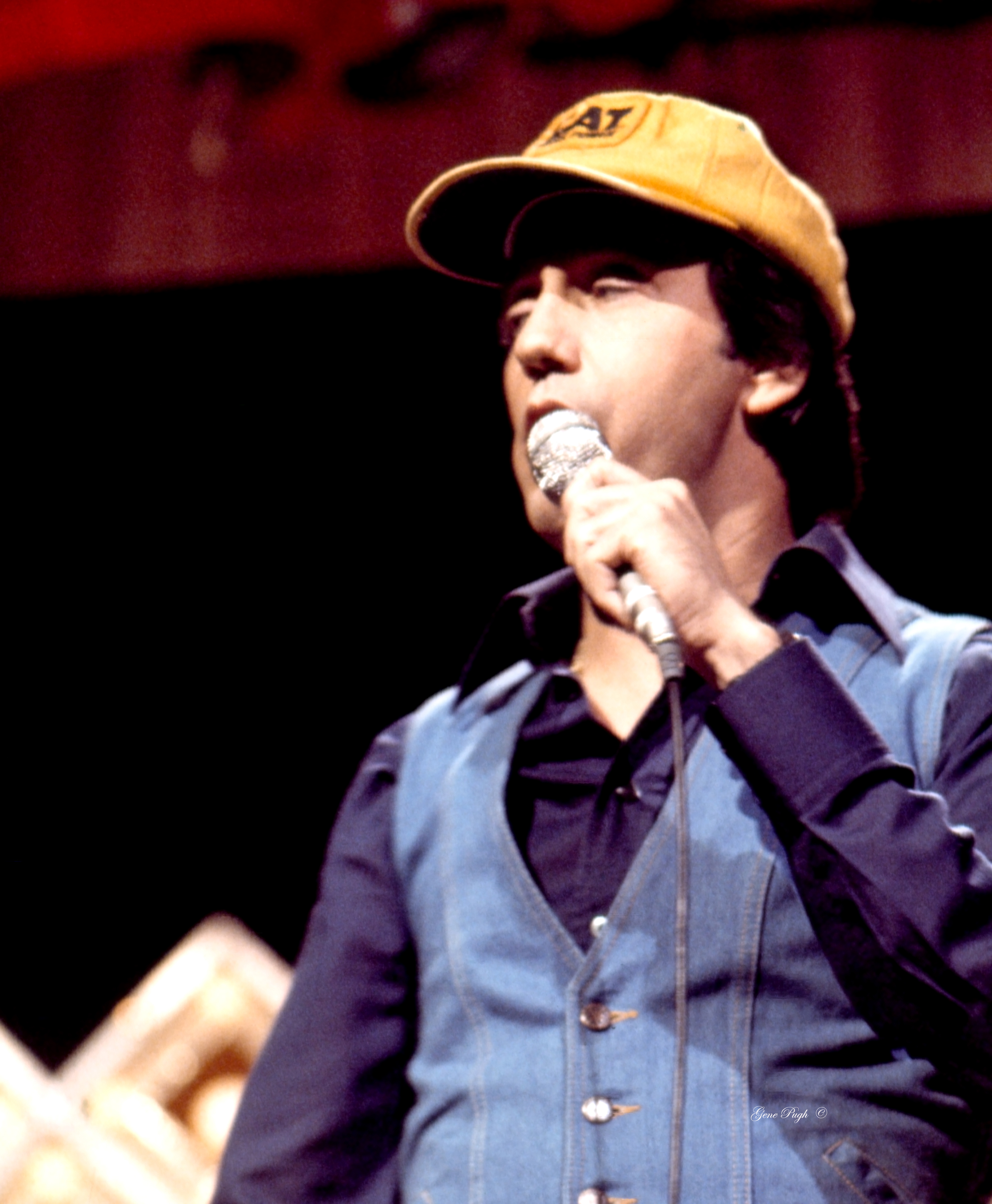
"The Streak" by Ray Stevens was one of three singles to spend three consecutive weeks at number one during the year.

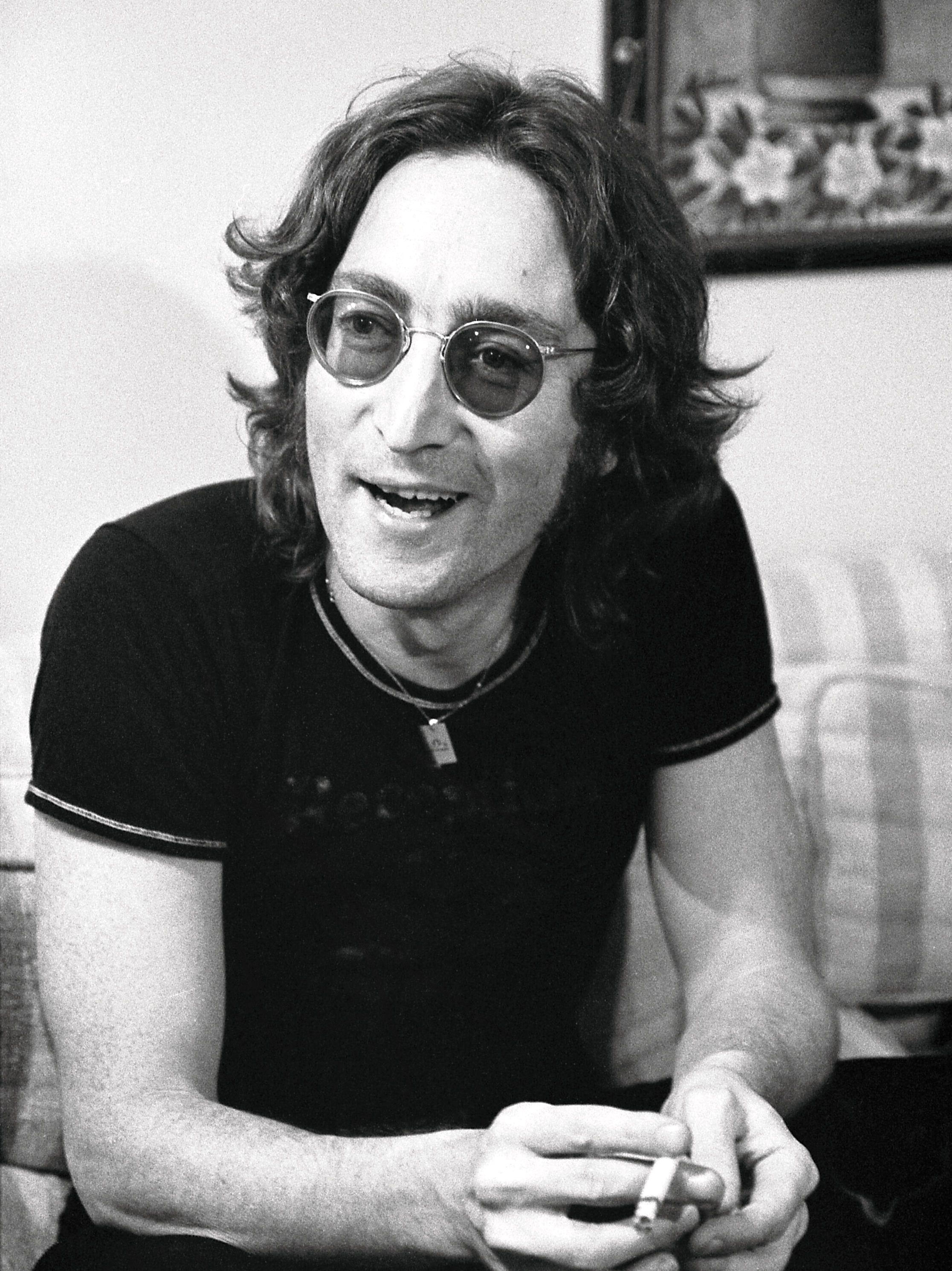
John Lennon gained his first solo number in 1974.

Chart history
No. (Note: The "No." column indicates the numerical sequence of number ones in Hot 100 history. "Re" indicates a single returning to number one.)	Issue date	Title	Artist(s)	Ref.
313	January 5	"Time in a Bottle"	Jim Croce	
314	January 12	"The Joker"	Steve Miller Band	
315	January 19	"Show and Tell"	Al Wilson	
316	January 26	"You're Sixteen"	Ringo Starr	
317	February 2	"The Way We Were"	Barbra Streisand	
318	February 9	"Love's Theme"	Love Unlimited Orchestra	
317 (re)	February 16	"The Way We Were"	Barbra Streisand	
317 (re)	February 23	"The Way We Were"	Barbra Streisand	
319	March 2	"Seasons in the Sun"	Terry Jacks	
319	March 9	"Seasons in the Sun"	Terry Jacks	
319	March 16	"Seasons in the Sun"	Terry Jacks	
320	March 23	"Dark Lady"	Cher	
321	March 30	"Sunshine on My Shoulders"	John Denver	
322	April 6	"Hooked on a Feeling"	Blue Swede	
323	April 13	"Bennie and the Jets"	Elton John	
324	April 20	"TSOP (The Sound of Philadelphia)"	MFSB and The Three Degrees	
324	April 27	"TSOP (The Sound of Philadelphia)"	MFSB and The Three Degrees	
325	May 4	"The Loco-Motion"	Grand Funk	
325	May 11	"The Loco-Motion"	Grand Funk	
326	May 18	"The Streak"	Ray Stevens	
326	May 25	"The Streak"	Ray Stevens	
326	June 1	"The Streak"	Ray Stevens	
327	June 8	"Band on the Run"	Paul McCartney and Wings	
328	June 15	"Billy Don't Be a Hero"	Bo Donaldson and The Heywoods	
328	June 22	"Billy Don't Be a Hero"	Bo Donaldson and The Heywoods	
329	June 29	"Sundown"	Gordon Lightfoot	
330	July 6	"Rock the Boat"	The Hues Corporation	
331	July 13	"Rock Your Baby"	George McCrae	
331	July 20	"Rock Your Baby"	George McCrae	
332	July 27	"Annie's Song"	John Denver	
332	August 3	"Annie's Song"	John Denver	
333	August 10	"Feel Like Makin' Love"	Roberta Flack	
334	August 17	"The Night Chicago Died"	Paper Lace	
335	August 24	"(You're) Having My Baby"	Paul Anka and Odia Coates	
335	August 31	"(You're) Having My Baby"	Paul Anka and Odia Coates	
335	September 7	"(You're) Having My Baby"	Paul Anka and Odia Coates	
336	September 14	"I Shot the Sheriff"	Eric Clapton	
337	September 21	"Can't Get Enough of Your Love, Babe"	Barry White	
338	September 28	"Rock Me Gently"	Andy Kim	
339	October 5	"I Honestly Love You"	Olivia Newton-John	
339	October 12	"I Honestly Love You"	Olivia Newton-John	
340	October 19	"Nothing from Nothing"	Billy Preston	
341	October 26	"Then Came You"	Dionne Warwick and The Spinners	
342	November 2	"You Haven't Done Nothin'"	Stevie Wonder	
343	November 9	"You Ain't Seen Nothing Yet"	Bachman–Turner Overdrive	
344	November 16	"Whatever Gets You thru the Night"	John Lennon	
345	November 23	"I Can Help"	Billy Swan	
345	November 30	"I Can Help"	Billy Swan	
346	December 7	"Kung Fu Fighting"	Carl Douglas	
346	December 14	"Kung Fu Fighting"	Carl Douglas	
347	December 21	"Cat's in the Cradle"	Harry Chapin	
348	December 28	"Angie Baby"	Helen Reddy	

== Number-one artists ==
List of number-one artists by total weeks at number one
Weeks at No. 1	Artist
3	Barbra Streisand
3	Terry Jacks
3	Ray Stevens
3	John Denver
3	Paul Anka
3	Odia Coates
2	MFSB
2	The Three Degrees
2	Grand Funk
2	Bo Donaldson and The Heywoods
2	George McCrae
2	Olivia Newton-John
2	Billy Swan
2	Carl Douglas
1	Jim Croce
1	Steve Miller Band
1	Al Wilson
1	Ringo Starr
1	Love Unlimited Orchestra
1	Cher
1	Blue Swede
1	Elton John
1	Paul McCartney and Wings
1	Gordon Lightfoot
1	The Hues Corporation
1	Roberta Flack
1	Paper Lace
1	Eric Clapton
1	Barry White
1	Andy Kim
1	Billy Preston
1	Dionne Warwick
1	The Spinners
1	Stevie Wonder
1	Bachman–Turner Overdrive
1	John Lennon
1	Harry Chapin
1	Helen Reddy

== See also ==
- 1974 in music
- List of Cash Box Top 100 number-one singles of 1974
- List of Billboard Hot 100 number-one singles of the 1970s
