= List of number-one singles of 1974 (Ireland) =

This is a list of singles which have reached number one on the Irish Singles Chart in 1974.

Issue date	Song	Artist	Ref.
3 January	"Merry Xmas Everybody"	Slade	
10 January	"I'm Gonna Make It"	Joe Cuddy	
17 January	"I'm Gonna Make It"	Joe Cuddy	
24 January	"You Won't Find Another Fool Like Me"	The New Seekers	
31 January	"Tiger Feet"	Mud	
7 February	"Tiger Feet"	Mud	
14 February	"Teenage Rampage"	Sweet	
21 February	"Teenage Rampage"	Sweet	
28 February	"Devil Gate Drive"	Suzi Quatro	
7 March	"Jealous Mind"	Alvin Stardust	
14 March	"Jealous Mind"	Alvin Stardust	
21 March	"Cross Your Heart"	Tina	
28 March	"Cross Your Heart"	Tina	
4 April	"Billy Don't Be a Hero"	Paper Lace	
11 April	"Cross Your Heart"	Tina	
18 April	"Seasons in the Sun"	Terry Jacks	
25 April	"Waterloo"	ABBA	
2 May	"Waterloo"	ABBA	
9 May	"Any Dream Will Do"	Joe Cuddy	
16 May	"Any Dream Will Do"	Joe Cuddy	
23 May	"Any Dream Will Do"	Joe Cuddy	
30 May	"I See a Star"	Mouth & McNeal	
6 June	"Any Dream Will Do"	Joe Cuddy	
13 June	"Any Dream Will Do"	Joe Cuddy	
20 June	"I See a Star"	Mouth & McNeal	
27 June	"Always Yours"	Gary Glitter	
4 July	"Always Yours"	Gary Glitter	
11 July	"Old Love Letters"	Big Tom	
18 July	"She"	Charles Aznavour	
25 July	"If Ma Could See Me Now"	The Times	
1 August	"If Ma Could See Me Now"	The Times	
8 August	"If Ma Could See Me Now"	The Times	
15 August	"If Ma Could See Me Now"	The Times	
22 August	"Abbeyshrule"	Brendan Shine	
29 August	"Abbeyshrule"	Brendan Shine	
5 September	"Abbeyshrule"	Brendan Shine	
12 September	"19 Men"	Dermot Hegarty	
19 September	"19 Men"	Dermot Hegarty	
26 September	"19 Men"	Dermot Hegarty	
3 October	"Kung Fu Fighting"	Carl Douglas	
10 October	"Kung Fu Fighting"	Carl Douglas	
17 October	"Annie's Song"	John Denver	
24 October	"Annie's Song"	John Denver	
31 October	"Everything I Own"	Ken Boothe	
7 November	"Everything I Own"	Ken Boothe	
14 November	"Everything I Own"	Ken Boothe	
21 November	"Gonna Make You a Star"	David Essex	
28 November	"Gonna Make You a Star"	David Essex	
5 December	"Gonna Make You a Star"	David Essex	
12 December	"Gonna Make You a Star"	David Essex	
19 December	"Oh Yes! You're Beautiful"	Gary Glitter	
26 December	"Oh Yes! You're Beautiful"	Gary Glitter	

== See also ==
- 1974 in music
- Irish Singles Chart
- List of artists who reached number one in Ireland
