= List of Billboard Easy Listening number ones of 1974 =

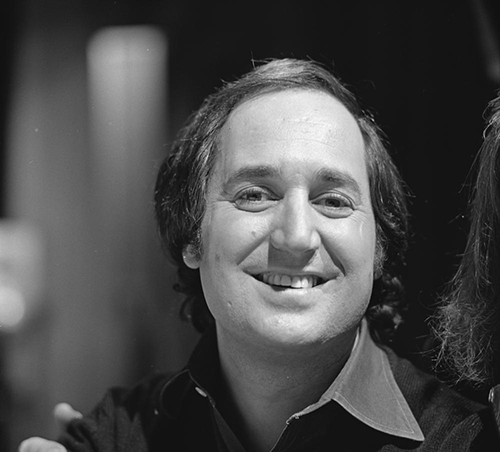
Neil Sedaka topped the chart for two weeks with "Laughter in the Rain".

In 1974, Billboard magazine published a chart ranking the top-performing songs in the United States in the easy listening market. The chart, which in 1974 was entitled Easy Listening, has undergone various name changes and has been published under the title Adult Contemporary since 1996. In 1974, 35 songs topped the chart based on playlists submitted by radio stations and sales reports submitted by stores.

In the issue dated January 5, 1974, the number-one position on the chart was held by "Time in a Bottle" by Jim Croce for a second consecutive week. It was a posthumous chart-topper for the singer, who had died in an airplane crash in September of the previous year. Croce achieved a second posthumous number one in April with "I'll Have to Say I Love You in a Song". Chicago, Gordon Lightfoot, Anne Murray and Charlie Rich also achieved two number ones in 1974, as did the Three Degrees, who had one chart-topper in their own right and another as featured vocalists on the song "TSOP (The Sound of Philadelphia)" by MFSB, the theme tune to the syndicated television show Soul Train. John Denver and Helen Reddy each had three number ones during 1974, with Denver's total of seven weeks in the top spot being the highest by any act. The country-rock singer Denver was at the peak of his career in 1974, selling millions of records and achieving number ones on the pop, easy listening and country charts.

Many of 1974's Easy Listening number ones also topped Billboard's pop singles chart, the Hot 100, reflecting the fact that at the time mellower styles were popular across a range of demographics and on pop music radio as well as the easy listening format. Songs by Croce, Barbra Streisand, the Love Unlimited Orchestra, Terry Jacks, MFSB featuring the Three Degrees, Denver, Gordon Lightfoot, Olivia Newton-John and Reddy all topped both listings. The final easy listening number one of the year was "Mandy" by Barry Manilow, which would go on to top the Hot 100 in 1975 and prove to be the breakthrough song for an artist who would become one of the most successful acts in the easy listening field.

== Chart history ==
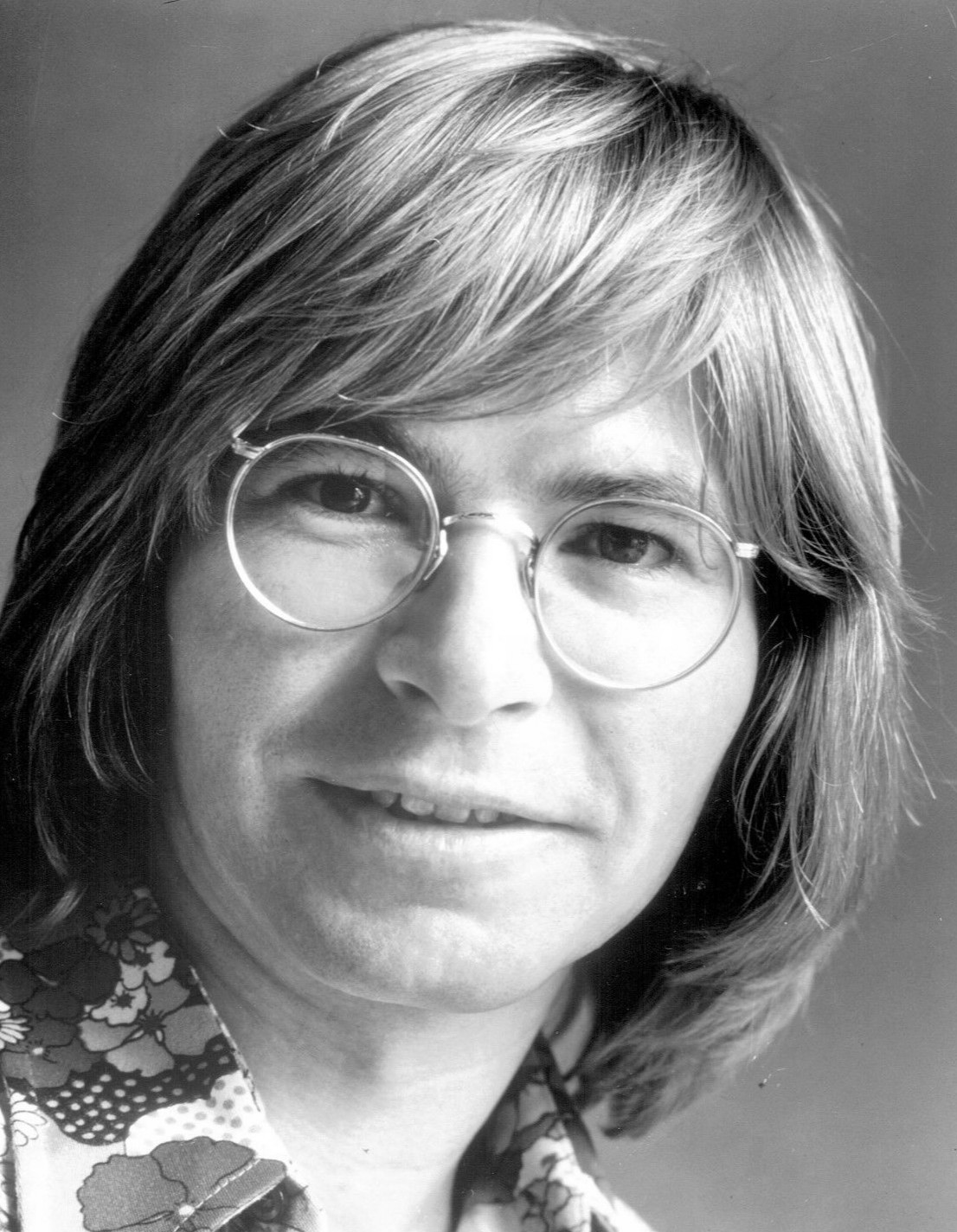
John Denver had three number ones and spent seven weeks in the top spot.

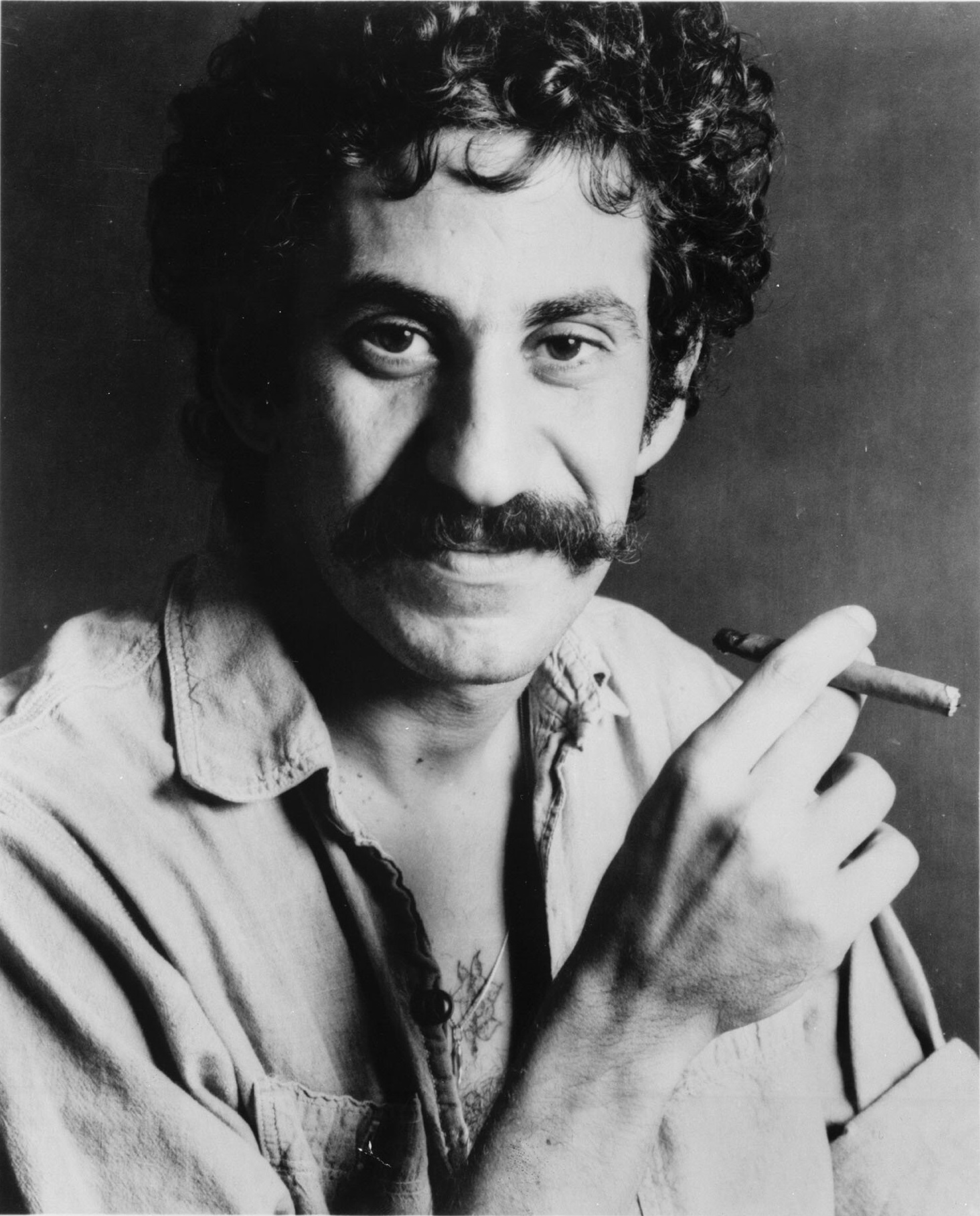
Jim Croce had two posthumous number ones in 1974; he had died in September of the previous year.

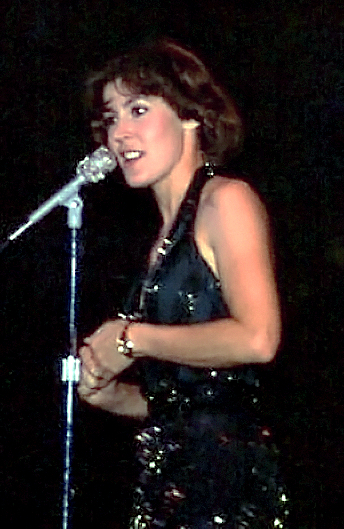
Helen Reddy had three number ones during the year.

Chart history
Issue date	Title	Artist(s)	Ref.
January 5	"Time in a Bottle"	Jim Croce	
January 12	"The Way We Were"	Barbra Streisand	
January 19	"The Way We Were"	Barbra Streisand	
January 26	"Love's Theme"	The Love Unlimited Orchestra	
February 2	"Love's Theme"	The Love Unlimited Orchestra	
February 9	"A Love Song"	Anne Murray	
February 16	"Last Time I Saw Him"	Diana Ross	
February 23	"Last Time I Saw Him"	Diana Ross	
March 2	"Last Time I Saw Him"	Diana Ross	
March 9	"Seasons in the Sun"	Terry Jacks	
March 16	"Sunshine on My Shoulders"	John Denver	
March 23	"Sunshine on My Shoulders"	John Denver	
March 30	"A Very Special Love Song"	Charlie Rich	
April 6	"A Very Special Love Song"	Charlie Rich	
April 13	"Keep On Singing"	Helen Reddy	
April 20	"Keep On Singing"	Helen Reddy	
April 27	"I'll Have to Say I Love You in a Song"	Jim Croce	
May 4	"TSOP (The Sound of Philadelphia)"	MFSB featuring the Three Degrees	
May 11	"TSOP (The Sound of Philadelphia)"	MFSB featuring the Three Degrees	
May 18	"The Entertainer"	Marvin Hamlisch	
May 25	"Help Me"	Joni Mitchell	
June 1	"I Won't Last a Day Without You"	The Carpenters	
June 8	"Sundown"	Gordon Lightfoot	
June 15	"Sundown"	Gordon Lightfoot	
June 22	"You Won't See Me"	Anne Murray	
June 29	"You Won't See Me"	Anne Murray	
July 6	"Annie's Song"	John Denver	
July 13	"Annie's Song"	John Denver	
July 20	"Annie's Song"	John Denver	
July 27	"You and Me Against the World"	Helen Reddy	
August 3	"Please Come to Boston"	Dave Loggins	
August 10	"Feel Like Makin' Love"	Roberta Flack	
August 17	"Feel Like Makin' Love"	Roberta Flack	
August 24	"Call on Me"	Chicago	
August 31	"I'm Leaving It Up to You"	Donny and Marie Osmond	
September 7	"I Love My Friend"	Charlie Rich	
September 14	"I Honestly Love You"	Olivia Newton-John	
September 21	"I Honestly Love You"	Olivia Newton-John	
September 28	"I Honestly Love You"	Olivia Newton-John	
October 5	"Tin Man"	America	
October 12	"Stop and Smell the Roses"	Mac Davis	
October 19	"Carefree Highway"	Gordon Lightfoot	
October 26	"Back Home Again"	John Denver	
November 2	"Back Home Again"	John Denver	
November 9	"My Melody of Love"	Bobby Vinton	
November 16	"Longfellow Serenade"	Neil Diamond	
November 23	"Laughter in the Rain"	Neil Sedaka	
November 30	"Laughter in the Rain"	Neil Sedaka	
December 7	"Angie Baby"	Helen Reddy	
December 14	"When Will I See You Again"	The Three Degrees	
December 21	"Wishing You Were Here"	Chicago	
December 28	"Mandy"	Barry Manilow	

== See also ==
- 1974 in music
- List of artists who reached number one on the U.S. Adult Contemporary chart
