= Kung Fu Fighting and Other Great Love Songs =

- Cover to the North American version from 20th Century Records

Studio album by Carl Douglas
- Released: November 16, 1974
- Recorded: 1974
- Studios: Nova Sound Studios, London, England, United Kingdom
- Genres: Disco; soul; novelty
- Length: 30:14
- Label: 20th Century
- Producer: Biddu

Carl Douglas chronology
| Kung Fu Fighting and Other Great Love Songs (1974) | Love Peace and Happiness (1977) |

Singles from Kung Fu Fighting and Other Great Love Songs
- 1. "Kung Fu Fighting" Released: September 21, 1974; 2. "Dance the Kung Fu" Released: February 1975; 3. "Blue Eyed Soul" Released: April 1975

Kung Fu Fighting and Other Great Love Songs is the debut studio album by Jamaican disco artist Carl Douglas. It reached number one on the Billboard Soul LPs chart and number 37 on Billboard's overall Top LPs & Tape chart in 1975. In Europe, Asia, Africa and South America the album was released under the name Kung Fu Fighter.

== Reception ==
Professional ratings
Review scores
| Source | Rating |
|---|---|
| AllMusic | 3/5 stars |

The editorial board of AllMusic Guide scored this album three out of five stars, with reviewer Alex Henderson noting that while the two lead singles of the album are novelty songs focusing on disco beats with lyrics about kung fu, "in fact, most of the tracks aren't novelty items" as "other songs have more romantic lyrics and are competent, if unremarkable, examples of Northern soul-pop".

== Track listing ==
Songwriters are noted next to track titles.

1. "Kung Fu Fighting" (Carl Douglas) – 3:15
2. "Witchfinder General" (Douglas) – 2:56
3. "When You Got Love" (Biddu) – 3:31
4. "Changing Times" (Douglas) – 3:00
5. "I Want to Give You My Everything" (Larry Weiss) – 2:37
6. "Dance the Kung Fu" (Douglas and Biddu) – 3:09
7. "Never Had This Dream Before" (Lee Vanderbilt) – 3:10
8. "I Don't Care What People Say" (Biddu and Vanderbilt) – 3:36
9. "Blue Eyed Soul" (Biddu) – 4:49

== Personnel ==
- Carl Douglas – vocals
- Stephen Allan – tape operation
- Biddu – production, coordination
- Robin Blanchflower – coordination
- Bones – backing vocals
- Richard Dodd – engineering
- Gerry Shury – arrangement on all songs except "When You Got Love" and "I Don't Care What People Say"
- Pip Williams – arrangement on "When You Got Love" and "I Don't Care What People Say"

== Charts ==
Chart performance for Kung Fu Fighting and Other Great Love Songs
| Chart (1975) | Peak position |
|---|---|
| Australia (Kent Music Report) | 40 |
| Canada Top Albums/CDs (RPM) | 48 |
| US Billboard 200 | 37 |
| US Soul LPs (Billboard) | 1 |
