= Elwood (American musician) =

American singer-songwriter

- Born: July 2, 1970 (age 56)
- Origin: US
- Genres: Hip hop, rock, pop
- Label: Palm Pictures/Gobstopper
- Past members: Prince Elwood Strickland III; Brian Boland

Elwood is the musical project/collaboration of singer-songwriter Prince Elwood Strickland III (born in North Carolina) and co-producer and songwriter Brian Boland. Strickland worked as a recording engineer at SoHo's Greene St. Recording facility where Boland and he met, working with artists such as Tricky, Mos Def, De La Soul, and Adam Yauch. Elwood worked with producer Steve Lillywhite on their debut album The Parlance of Our Time, which was co-released on Palm Pictures and Lillywhite's label, Gobstopper.

Elwood's cover of Gordon Lightfoot's song "Sundown" peaked at number 33 on the Billboard Modern Rock Tracks chart on July 8, 2000. and number 65 in Australia.

Elwood's first album, The Parlance of Our Time, was released May 16, 2000.

== Discography ==
=== Albums ===
List of albums, with selected details
Title	Details
The Parlance of Our Time	Released: May 2000; Format: CD
