= Kung Fu Fighting =

1974 single by Carl Douglas

Single by Carl Douglas

from the album Kung Fu Fighting and Other Great Love Songs
- B-side: "Gamblin' Man"
- Released: August 1974
- Genre: Disco
- Length: 3:15
- Label: Pye (UK and Canada); 20th Century Fox (US); Astor (Australia)
- Songwriter: Carl Douglas
- Producer: Biddu Appaiah

Carl Douglas singles chronology
"Kung Fu Fighting" (1974)	"Dance the Kung Fu" (1975)

"Kung Fu Fighting" is a disco song by the Jamaican-British vocalist Carl Douglas, written by Douglas and produced by British-Indian musician Biddu. It was released in 1974 as the first single from his debut album, Kung Fu Fighting and Other Great Love Songs (1974), on the cusp of a chopsocky film craze and rose to the top of the British, Australian, Canadian, and American charts, in addition to reaching the top of the Soul Singles chart. It received a Gold certification from the RIAA in 1974 and popularized disco music. It eventually went on to sell eleven million records worldwide, making it one of the best-selling singles of all time.

"Kung Fu Fighting" was rated number 100 in VH1's 100 Greatest one-hit wonders, and number one in the UK Channel 4's Top 10 One Hit Wonders list in 2000, the same channel's 50 Greatest One Hit Wonders poll in 2006 and Bring Back ... the one-hit Wonders, for which Carl Douglas performed the song in a live concert. The song was covered (using different lyrics) by CeeLo Green with Jack Black and The Vamps for the first and third films of the Kung Fu Panda franchise, respectively.

== Background and composition ==
The song was originally meant to be a B-side to Douglas's song "I Want to Give You My Everything" (written by Larry Weiss). Biddu originally hired Douglas to sing "I Want to Give You My Everything" but needed something to record for the B-side, and asked Douglas if he had any lyrics they could use. Douglas showed several, and Biddu chose the one that would later be called "Kung Fu Fighting" and worked out a melody but did not take the song too seriously.

After more than two hours recording the A-side and then time for a break, there were only ten minutes of studio time remaining due to a three-hour time constraint for the entire session. This meant only two takes of "Kung Fu Fighting" were recorded. According to Biddu, "'Kung Fu Fighting' was the B-side so I went over the top on the 'huhs' and the 'hahs' and the chopping sounds. It was a B-side: who was going to listen?" After hearing both songs, Robin Blanchflower of Pye Records insisted that "Kung Fu Fighting" be the A-side instead.

Following its release, the song did not receive any radio airplay for the first five weeks and sold poorly. However, "Kung Fu Fighting" began gaining popularity in dance clubs, eventually entered the UK Singles Chart at number 42 on 17 August 1974, and peaked at number 1 on 21 September, where it remained for three weeks. It was then released in the United States, where it quickly topped the Billboard Hot 100 chart. The single went on to sell eleven million records worldwide. At the Amusement & Music Operators Association (AMOA) Jukebox Awards in 1975, the song was awarded "Jukebox Soul Record of the Year" for being the year's highest-earning soul music song played on jukebox machines in the United States. The song was featured in the 1981 film This Is Elvis.

The song uses the Oriental riff, a short musical phrase that is used to signify Chinese culture. In April 2011, musician Simon Ledger was arrested by police on the Isle of Wight after a man of Chinese heritage took offense to Ledger’s performing the song. While authorities said anyone who feels they are the victim of a racially-motivated crime has the right to file a complaint, they ultimately did not have sufficient evidence to charge Ledger with such.

== Charts ==
=== Weekly charts ===
Chart (1974–1975)	Peak position
Australia (Kent Music Report)	1
Austria (Ö3 Austria Top 40)	1
Belgium (Ultratop 50 Flanders)	1
Belgium (Ultratop 50 Wallonia)	1
Canada Top Singles (RPM)	1
Finland (Suomen virallinen lista)	6
Ireland (IRMA)	1
Netherlands (Dutch Top 40)	1
Netherlands (Single Top 100)	1
New Zealand	1
Norway (VG-lista)	3
South Africa (Springbok Radio)	1
Switzerland (Schweizer Hitparade)	2
UK Singles (Official Charts)	1
US Billboard Hot 100	1
US Hot Disco Singles (Billboard)	3
US Hot Soul Singles (Billboard)	1
US Cash Box Top 100	1
US Record World Singles	1
West Germany (GfK)	1

=== Year-end charts ===
Chart (1974)	Position
Australia (Kent Music Report)	22
Belgium (Ultratop 50 Flanders)	8
Canada Top Singles (RPM)	18
France (IFOP)	5
Netherlands (Dutch Top 40)	9
South Africa (Springbok Radio)	2

Chart (1975)	Position
Australia (Kent Music Report)	53
Austria (Ö3 Austria Top 40)	5
Brazil (Brazilian Radio Airplay)	13
US Billboard Hot 100	14
US Cash Box Top 100	11

=== All-time charts ===
Chart (1958–2018)	Position
US Billboard Hot 100	443

== Sales and certifications ==
Region	Certification	Certified units/sales
United Kingdom (BPI)	Gold	500,000^{^}
United States (RIAA)	Platinum	2,000,000^{^}
Worldwide	—	11,000,000
^{^} Shipments figures based on certification alone.

== Track listing ==
1. "Kung Fu Fighting" – 3:15
2. "Gamblin' Man" – 3:03

== Bus Stop version ==
"Kung Fu Fighting"

Single by Bus Stop featuring Carl Douglas

from the album Ticket to Ride
- Released: 11 May 1998
- Genre: Eurodance
- Length: 3:45
- Label: All Around the World (UK)
- Songwriter: Carl Douglas
- Producers: Graham Turner; Mark Hall

Bus Stop singles chronology
"Kung Fu Fighting" (1998)	"You Ain't Seen Nothin' Yet" (1998)

British dance act Bus Stop reached number eight on the UK Singles Chart with their 1998 remix single of "Kung Fu Fighting", which sampled the original vocals by Carl Douglas and added rap verses. In Australia, the single received a gold certification from ARIA. The song was featured in the 1999 film Bowfinger and 2001 film Shaolin Soccer.

=== Charts ===
==== Weekly charts ====
Chart (1998)	Peak position
Australia (ARIA)	15
Belgium (Ultratop 50 Flanders)	39
Belgium (Ultratop 50 Wallonia)	22
Canada Dance/Urban (RPM)	11
Denmark (IFPI)	10
Estonia (Eesti Top 20)	4
Europe (Eurochart Hot 100)	50
France (SNEP)	25
Ireland (IRMA)	12
New Zealand (Recorded Music NZ)	1
Scottish Singles Sales (Official Charts)	6
Sweden (Sverigetopplistan)	20
UK Singles (Official Charts)	8

==== Year-end charts ====
Chart (1998)	Position
Australia (ARIA)	40
New Zealand (Recorded Music NZ)	7

=== Sales and certifications ===
Region	Certification	Certified units/sales
Australia (ARIA)	Gold	35,000^{^}
New Zealand (RMNZ)	Platinum	10,000^{*}
United Kingdom (BPI)	Gold	400,000^{^}
^{*} Sales figures based on certification alone.^{^} Shipments figures based on certification alone.

== See also ==
- List of 1970s one-hit wonders in the United States
- List of Top 25 singles for 1974 in Australia
- List of Dutch Top 40 number-one singles of 1974
- List of number-one singles of 1974 (Canada)
- List of number-one singles of 1974 (France)
- List of number-one hits of 1974 (Germany)
- List of number-one singles of 1974 (Ireland)
- List of number-one singles in 1974 (New Zealand)
- List of UK Singles Chart number ones of the 1970s
- List of Billboard Hot 100 number-one singles of 1974
- List of Cash Box Top 100 number-one singles of 1974
- List of number-one R&B singles of 1975 (U.S.)
- List of number-one singles from the 1990s (New Zealand)
