= Sundown (Gordon Lightfoot song) =

Single by Gordon Lightfoot

from the album Sundown
- B-side: "Too Late for Prayin'"
- Released: March 25, 1974
- Recorded: November 1973
- Studio: Eastern Sound, Toronto
- Genre: Folk rock; country rock
- Length: 3:37
- Label: Reprise
- Songwriter: Gordon Lightfoot
- Producer: Lenny Waronker

Gordon Lightfoot singles chronology
| "Can't Depend on Love" (1973) | "Sundown" (1974) | "Carefree Highway" (1974) |

Audio
- "Sundown" on YouTube

"Sundown" is a song by Canadian folk artist Gordon Lightfoot, from the titular album, released as a single in March 1974.

"Sundown" reached number one on the U.S. Billboard Hot 100 and easy listening charts and number 13 on the Hot Country singles chart, as well as number one in Canada on RPM's national singles chart. It was Lightfoot's only single to reach number one on the Hot 100.

== Content ==
The lyrics describe a troubled romantic relationship (often cited as Cathy Smith), with the narrator recounting an affair with a "hard-loving woman [who's] got me feeling mean".

In a 2008 interview, Lightfoot said:

I think my girlfriend was out with her friends one night at a bar while I was at home writing songs. I thought, 'I wonder what she’s doing with her friends at that bar!' It's that kind of a feeling. 'Where is my true love tonight? What is my true love doing?'

Red Shea recorded the lead guitar and solo parts on his tobacco sunburst 1969 Gibson Les Paul Custom with Bigsby vibrato bar into a cranked Fender Silverface Twin Reverb with the tremolo on a low setting.

== Personnel ==
Engineered by Lee Herschberg
Recorded at Eastern Sound Studios, Toronto, Ontario, Canada

- Gordon Lightfoot: lead and backing vocals, twelve-string acoustic guitar
- Red Shea: electric lead guitar
- Terry Clements: acoustic lead guitar
- John Stockfish: bass guitar
- Jim Gordon: drums

== Chart performance ==
=== Weekly charts ===
Weekly chart performance for "Sundown"
| Chart (1974) | Peak position |
|---|---|
| Australia (Kent Music Report) | 4 |
| Canadian RPM Top Singles | 1 |
| Canadian RPM Adult Contemporary | 2 |
| Canadian RPM Country Tracks | 4 |
| Germany (GfK) | 30 |
| Ireland (IRMA) | 14 |
| Netherlands | 16 |
| New Zealand (Listener) | 2 |
| South Africa (Springbok Radio) | 1 |
| UK Singles Chart | 33 |
| US Billboard Hot 100 | 1 |
| US Easy Listening (Billboard) | 1 |
| US Hot Country Songs (Billboard) | 13 |
| Yugoslavian Singles Chart | 2 |

2023 weekly chart performance for "Sundown"
| Chart (2023) | Peak position |
|---|---|
| US Hot Rock & Alternative Songs (Billboard) | 11 |

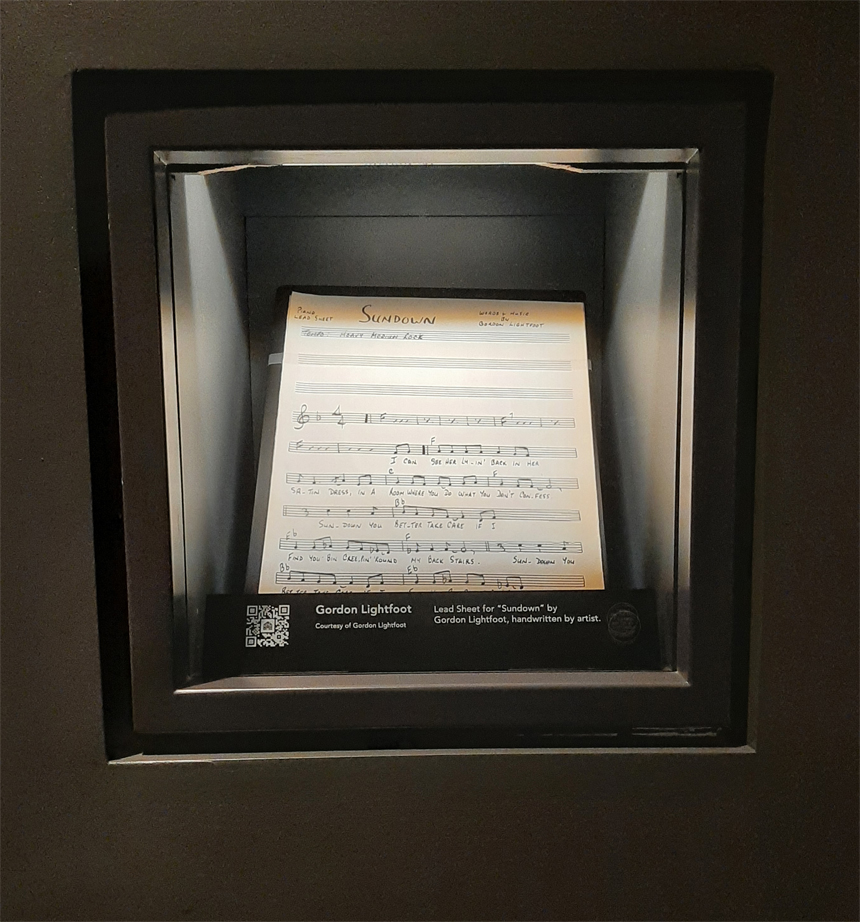
The handwritten lead sheet for the song (now located in Massey Hall)

=== Year-end charts ===
Year-end chart performance for "Sundown"
| Chart (1974) | Rank |
|---|---|
| Australia (Kent Music Report) | 35 |
| Canadian RPM Top Singles | 3 |
| South Africa | 4 |
| US Billboard Hot 100 | 27 |
| US Cashbox Top 100 | 32 |

== Certifications ==
| Region | Certification | Certified units/sales |
|---|---|---|
| United States (RIAA) | Gold | 1,000,000^{^} |
^{^} Shipments figures based on certification alone.

== Other notable versions ==
- American country music singer Deryl Dodd's version of the song peaked at number 59 on Billboard's Hot Country Singles and Tracks chart in 1999. It was later included on his album, Pearl Snaps (2002).
- The musical project/collaboration of singer-songwriters Elwood covered the song in 2000. This version peaked at number 33 on the Billboard Modern Rock Tracks chart on July 8, 2000.

== See also ==
- List of Hot 100 number-one singles of 1974 (U.S.)
- List of number-one adult contemporary singles of 1974 (U.S.)
- List of RPM number-one singles of 1974
