= Sunshine on My Shoulders =

1973 single by John Denver

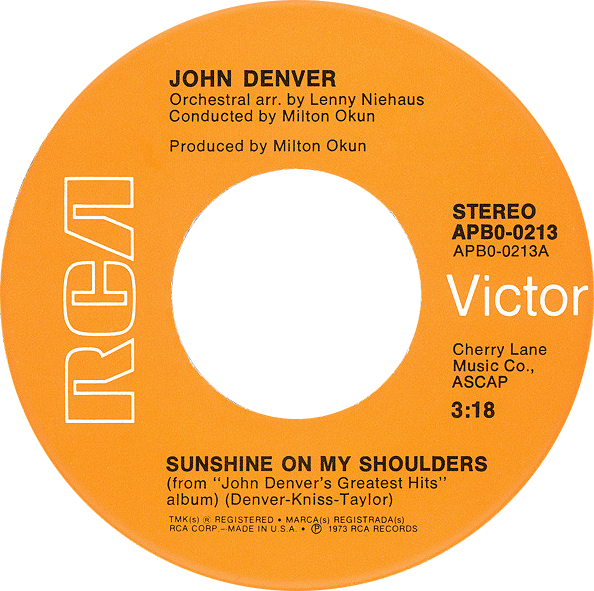
- Side A of 1974 US single release

Single by John Denver

from the album Poems, Prayers & Promises
- A-side: "I'd Rather Be a Cowboy" (original)
- B-side: "Around and Around" (reissue)
- Released: May 1973
- Recorded: 1971
- Genre: Folk; country; soft rock
- Length: 3:18 (Single version); 5:12 (Album version)
- Label: RCA Records
- Songwriters: John Denver; Dick Kniss; Mike Taylor
- Producer: Milt Okun

John Denver singles chronology
"Rocky Mountain High" (1973)	"Sunshine on My Shoulders" (1973)	"Annie's Song" (1974)

"Sunshine on My Shoulders" (sometimes titled simply "Sunshine") is a song recorded and co-written by the American singer-songwriter John Denver. It was originally released as an album track on 1971's Poems, Prayers & Promises and later, as a single in 1973. The song went to No. 1 on the Billboard Hot 100 chart in the U.S. in early 1974.

== Song history ==
Denver described how he wrote "Sunshine on My Shoulders": "I wrote the song in Minnesota at the time I call 'late winter, early spring'. It was a dreary day, gray and slushy. The snow was melting and it was too cold to go outside and have fun, but God, you're ready for spring. You want to get outdoors again and you're waiting for that sun to shine, and you remember how sometimes just the sun itself can make you feel good. And in that very melancholy frame of mind I wrote 'Sunshine on My Shoulders'."

The song was slightly remixed for single release, with the addition of strings and woodwinds to enhance the background of the song. The album version features an extra verse, not heard on the Singles charts, due to the song's length. In addition to Denver's first verse describing if he had a day and a song, the second verse mentions his describing if he had a tale and a wish. The song ends with the words "Sunshine almost always" (instead of "Sunshine always"), being held on until the song's end. The full-length single mix with the second verse has been released on most of Denver's hits compilations.

The song was originally the B-side of one of Denver's earlier songs, "I'd Rather Be a Cowboy". As the Vietnam War came to an end, the song took on a new significance and began to receive airplay on adult contemporary radio stations. It entered the Billboard Hot 100 at number 90 on January 26, 1974, and topped the charts for a week. The song also topped the adult contemporary chart for two weeks in 1974. Billboard ranked it as the No. 18 song for 1974. Cash Box said "Soft, tender ballad receives a treatment equal to the task and the pretty lyrics come shining through as a result. A good remedy for relaxation in these troubled times." Record World said that "Denver scores with this ballad which will send him back home to the top of the charts."

== Personnel ==
- John Denver – 6 & 12-string acoustic guitars, vocals
- Mike Taylor – acoustic guitar
- Richard Kniss – double bass
- Frank Owens – piano

The song also features strings and winds, including oboes.

== In popular culture ==
A 2 1/2-hour made-for-television movie titled Sunshine, which aired on CBS in 1973, used the song as a theme. The movie starred Cliff DeYoung and Cristina Raines. It told the story of a young mother dying from cancer. High ratings prompted a TV series (also Sunshine) which ran for three months during the summer of 1974. The short-lived series began where the movie left off with the young, widowed father (DeYoung) raising his stepdaughter (Elizabeth Cheshire).

In the John Denver biographical film Take Me Home: The John Denver Story (2000) it is played when Denver (Chad Lowe) takes his new glider out for a test flight. This final scene is based on the real life event that killed Denver in the year 1997. The 1996 re-recorded version is the one that is played.

The Jamaican producer Duke Reid had a hit with a reggae cover of "Sunshine on My Shoulders" in 1974, sung by Pat Kelly. This was Reid's final hit as he died the same year.

== Chart performance ==
Chart (1974)	Peak position
Canada Top Singles (RPM)	1
Canada Adult Contemporary (RPM)	2
US Billboard Hot 100	1
US Adult Contemporary (Billboard)	1
US Hot Country Singles (Billboard)	42

== Certifications ==
Region	Certification	Certified units/sales
Brazil (Pro-Música Brasil)	Gold	100,000
United States (RIAA)	Gold	1,000,000^{^}
^{^} Shipments figures based on certification alone.

== Carly Rae Jepsen version ==
"Sunshine on My Shoulders"

Promotional single by Carly Rae Jepsen

from the album Tug of War
- Released: June 16, 2008
- Length: 3:35
- Label: Fontana North; MapleMusic
- Songwriters: John Denver; Dick Kniss; Mike Taylor
- Producer: Ryan Stewart

Audio video
- "Sunshine on My Shoulders" on YouTube

The song was covered by Canadian singer-songwriter Carly Rae Jepsen as the promotional single from her debut studio album, Tug of War, released on June 16, 2008.

== See also ==
- List of RPM number-one singles of 1974
- List of Hot 100 number-one singles of 1974 (U.S.)
- List of number-one adult contemporary singles of 1974 (U.S.)

== Bibliography ==
- The Billboard Book of Top 40 Hits, Billboard Books, 9th edition, 2010, ISBN 978-0823085545
