= Annie's Song =

1974 single by John Denver

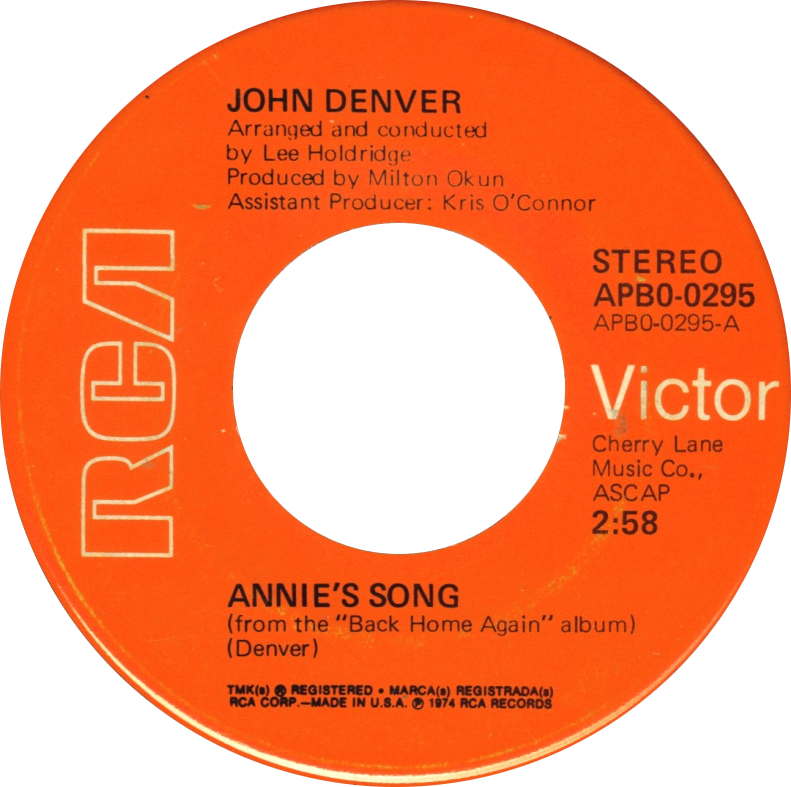
- Side A of 1974 US vinyl single

Single by John Denver

from the album Back Home Again
- B-side: "Cool an' Green an' Shady"
- Released: June 1974
- Genre: Country
- Length: 2:58
- Label: RCA
- Songwriter: John Denver
- Producer: Milt Okun

John Denver singles chronology
| "Sunshine on My Shoulders" (1973) | "Annie's Song" (1974) | "Back Home Again" (1974) |

Alternative cover
- 1976 Dutch vinyl picture sleeve

"Annie's Song" (also known as "Annie's Song (You Fill Up My Senses)") is a song written and recorded by American singer-songwriter John Denver. Released as the lead single from his eighth studio album Back Home Again, it was his second number-one song in the United States, occupying that spot for two weeks in July 1974. The song also went to number one on the Easy Listening chart. Billboard ranked it as the No. 25 song for 1974.

The song went to number one in the United Kingdom, where it was Denver's only major hit single. Four years later, an instrumental version also became flautist James Galway's only major British hit.

== Background ==
"Annie's Song" was written as an ode to Denver's wife at the time, Annie Martell Denver. Denver "wrote this song in January 1973 in about ten-and-a-half minutes one day on a ski lift" to the top of Aspen Mountain in Aspen, Colorado, as the physical exhilaration of having "just skied down a very difficult run" and the feeling of total immersion in the beauty of the colors and sounds that filled all senses inspired him to think about his wife. Annie Denver recalls the beginnings: "It was written after John and I had gone through a pretty intense time together and things were pretty good for us. He left to go skiing and he got on the Ajax chair on Aspen mountain and the song just came to him. He skied down and came home and wrote it down... Initially it was a love song and it was given to me through him and yet for him it became a bit like a prayer."

Milt Okun stated: "The first time I heard 'Annie's Song,' I told John it had the same melody as Tchaikovsky's Fifth Symphony, Second Movement. He walked over to the piano, sat for an hour and came back and the only thing remaining from Tchaikovsky was the first five notes. It was fantastic."

== Critical reception ==
Shawn M. Haney of Allmusic noted the song's expressive emotionality, calling it an "ever so romantic tearjerker". Haney praised "Annie's Song" as "one of Denver's finest achievements". Billboard called it a "fine love song." Record World said that this "folk ballad, subtle and sweet, glows with a continental flair that should take it to all the right places."

== Charts ==
=== Weekly charts ===
| Chart (1974) | Peak position |
|---|---|
| Australia (Kent Music Report) | 5 |
| Canadian RPM Top Singles | 1 |
| Canadian RPM Adult Contemporary | 1 |
| Canadian RPM Country Tracks | 3 |
| Ireland (IRMA) | 1 |
| South Africa (Springbok Radio) | 11 |
| UK Singles (Official Charts) | 1 |
| US Billboard Hot 100 | 1 |
| US Adult Contemporary (Billboard) | 1 |
| US Hot Country Songs (Billboard) | 9 |

| Chart (1976) | Peak position |
|---|---|
| Netherlands (Single Top 100) | 12 |

=== Year-end charts ===
| Chart (1974) | Rank |
|---|---|
| Australia (Kent Music Report) | 51 |
| Canada | 19 |
| UK | 15 |
| US Billboard Hot 100 | 25 |
| US Billboard Adult Contemporary | 5 |

== Certifications ==
| Region | Certification | Certified units/sales |
|---|---|---|
| New Zealand (RMNZ) | Platinum | 30,000^{‡} |
| United Kingdom (BPI) | Platinum | 600,000^{‡} |
| United States (RIAA) | Gold | 1,000,000^{^} |
^{^} Shipments figures based on certification alone.^{‡} Sales+streaming figures based on certification alone.

== Ville Valo cover ==
"Olet mun kaikuluotain"

Single by Ville Valo
- B-side: Freeman – "Olet mun kaikuluotain"
- Released: July 4, 2016
- Length: 3:26
- Label: Love
- Songwriters: John Denver, Hector

On July 4, 2016, Ville Valo released a cover version of "Annie's Song" in Finnish, titled "Olet mun kaikuluotain" ("You're My Sonar"). The lyrics were by Hector and the song had previously been recorded in 1976 by Freeman. Ville Valo's version was released as a tribute to Finnish label Love Records, who celebrated their 50th anniversary in 2016. Valo's version was also the first release from the label in over 30 years. Valo commented on the song, stating: "Kaikuluotain is a childhood favorite of mine, to the beat of which many a sleepless night ended up in tears. To this day it gives me cold shivers and goosebumps." The song would go on to reach number one on the Finnish Download Chart.

Valo's version also received a music video, directed by Ykä Järvinen. Released on July 11, 2016, the video features scenes of Valo walking around Helsinki, done in tribute to Aki Kaurismäki's film Calamari Union. The video received the Emma Award for Video of the Year in 2017.

== Adaptations ==
The Egan band performed Bilintx's song "Loiolan Jai Jai" with this tune, which became the common tune for the song.

A parody version of the first few bars of the song is included on Monty Python's Contractual Obligation Album, but was removed and replaced with an apology on later pressings of the album on legal advice.

=== Usage in sports ===
Sung to the tune of "Annie's Song", the "Greasy Chip Butty Song" is a common soccer chant in British sports that was created originally by the supporters of Rotherham United and later adopted, with local tweaks to the lyrics, by supporters of Burton Albion, Grimsby Town, Sheffield United and the St Helens rugby club, among others.

The amended lyrics were initially written in the late 1970s by a Rotherham United supporter named Terry Moran. The song quickly grew in popularity among Sheffield United supporters from the early 1980s, and is now considered the club's anthem. In 2020, Sheffield musician Max Restaino recorded a version of the song in aid of the Sheffield Hospitals Charity.

The lyrics to the Sheffield United version of the song are as follows:

You light up my senses,
Like a gallon of Magnet,
Like a packet of Woodbines,
Like a good pinch of snuff,
Like a night out in Sheffield,
Like a greasy chip butty,
Oh Sheffield United,
Come thrill me again.

— A version from 1997.

== See also ==
- List of RPM number-one singles of 1974
- List of number-one singles of 1974 (Ireland)
- List of number-one singles from the 1970s (UK)
- List of Hot 100 number-one singles of 1974 (U.S.)
- List of number-one adult contemporary singles of 1974 (U.S.)
