= I Shot the Sheriff =

Bob Marley & The Wailers song

- German vinyl release

Single by Bob Marley and the Wailers

from the album Burnin'
- Released: 12 February 1973
- Studio: Harry J Studio (Kingston, Jamaica)
- Genre: Reggae
- Length: 4:41
- Label: Tuff Gong; Island
- Songwriter: Bob Marley
- Producers: Chris Blackwell; The Wailers

Bob Marley and the Wailers singles chronology
"Keep On Moving" (1972)	"I Shot the Sheriff" (1973)	"Concrete Jungle" (1973)

Audio
- "I Shot the Sheriff" by Bob Marley and the Wailers on YouTube

Live video
- "I Shot the Sheriff" (1977 live) by Bob Marley and the Wailers on YouTube

"I Shot the Sheriff" is a song written by Jamaican reggae musician Bob Marley and released in 1973 with his band the Wailers.

== Background ==
The song was first released in 1973 on the Wailers' album Burnin'. Marley explained his intention as follows: "I want to say 'I shot the police' but the government would have made a fuss so I said 'I shot the sheriff' instead... but it's the same idea: justice."

In 1992, with the controversy surrounding the Ice-T song "Cop Killer", Marley's song was often cited by Ice-T's supporters as evidence of his detractors' hypocrisy, considering that the older song was never similarly criticised despite having much the same theme.

In 2012, Marley's former girlfriend Esther Anderson claimed that the lyrics, "Sheriff John Brown always hated me / For what, I don't know / Every time I plant a seed / He said, 'Kill it before it grow'" are actually about Marley being very opposed to her use of birth control pills; Marley supposedly replaced the word "doctor" with sheriff.

== Certifications ==
Region	Certification	Certified units/sales
New Zealand (RMNZ)	Platinum	30,000^{‡}
United Kingdom (BPI)	Silver	200,000^{‡}
^{‡} Sales+streaming figures based on certification alone.

== Eric Clapton version ==
"I Shot the Sheriff"
- A-side of the original 1974 UK vinyl release

Single by Eric Clapton

from the album 461 Ocean Boulevard
- B-side: "Give Me Strength"
- Released: 1974
- Genre: Blues rock; reggae rock
- Length: 6:50 (full-length version); 4:26 (album version); 3:30 (single version)
- Label: RSO
- Songwriter: Bob Marley
- Producer: Tom Dowd

Eric Clapton singles chronology
"Let It Rain" (1972)	"I Shot the Sheriff" (1974)	"Willie and the Hand Jive" (1974)

Audio
- "I Shot the Sheriff" (album version) by Eric Clapton on YouTube
- "I Shot the Sheriff" (full-length version) by Eric Clapton on YouTube

Live video
- "I Shot the Sheriff" (2010 live) by Eric Clapton on YouTube

Eric Clapton recorded a cover version that was included on his 1974 album 461 Ocean Boulevard. His performance of the song adds soft rock to the reggae sound. Billboard described this version as being "a catchy goof of a winner" despite not containing a guitar solo. Cash Box called it a "smooth bluesy rocker with lots of guitar, keyboards and strong background harmonies". Record World said that Clapton is "firing straight from the hip, both vocally and riff-wise". Faring better in the charts, it peaked at number one on the Billboard Hot 100, his only US number one to date. In 2003, Clapton's version was inducted into the Grammy Hall of Fame. In 2018, a longer version was released on the soundtrack to the documentary Eric Clapton: Life in 12 Bars. This version extends the instrumental bridge following the vocals.

=== Charts ===
==== Weekly charts ====
Chart (1974)	Peak position
Australia (Kent Music Report)	11
Austria (Ö3 Austria Top 40)	19
Belgium (Ultratop 50 Flanders)	7
Canada Top Singles (RPM)	1
Netherlands (Dutch Top 40)	5
Netherlands (Single Top 100)	5
New Zealand	1
Norway (VG-lista)	3
South Africa (Springbok)	9
Spain (AFYVE)	12
UK Singles (Official Charts)	9
US Billboard Hot 100	1
US Hot Soul Singles (Billboard)	33
US Cash Box Top 100	1
US Record World Singles	1
West Germany (GfK)	4

Chart (1982)	Peak position
Ireland (IRMA)	23
UK Singles (Official Charts)	64

==== Year-end charts ====
Chart (1974)	Position
Australia (Kent Music Report)	97
Belgium (Ultratop 50 Flanders)	58
Canada Top Singles (RPM)	11
Netherlands (Dutch Top 40)	50
US Billboard Hot 100	76

=== Certifications ===
Region	Certification	Certified units/sales
New Zealand (RMNZ)	Gold	15,000^{‡}
United States (RIAA)	Gold	1,000,000^{^}
^{^} Shipments figures based on certification alone.^{‡} Sales+streaming figures based on certification alone.

== Other versions ==
- In 1997, rapper Warren G interpolated and sampled the song on his hit of the same name.
- In 2012, New York based reggae band Island Head did an instrumental version on their debut album, Punky Reggae Party. This version features saxophonist Timmy Cappello who is known for playing with Tina Turner for 14 years and for his role in the film The Lost Boys. It was produced by Island Head drummer Billy Messinetti and also features Mikey Chung, Andy Bassford and keyboard player David Frank of the System.
- In 2025, Island Head released a vocal version. Using the 2012 recording, vocalist Billy Messinetti followed the lead saxophone performance played by Timmy Cappello.

== See also ==
- List of Billboard Hot 100 number-one singles of 1974
- List of Cash Box Top 100 number-one singles of 1974
- List of number-one singles of 1974 (Canada)
- List of number-one singles from the 1990s (New Zealand)
