= The Streak (song) =

Single by Ray Stevens

from the album Boogity Boogity
- B-side: "You've Got the Music Inside"
- Released: February 1974
- Recorded: 1973
- Genre: Country; novelty; comedy
- Length: 3:18
- Label: Barnaby
- Songwriter: Ray Stevens
- Producer: Ray Stevens

Ray Stevens singles chronology
"Love Me Longer" (1973)	"The Streak" (1974)	"The Moonlight Special" (1974)

"The Streak" is a country/novelty song written, produced, and sung by Ray Stevens. It was released in February 1974 as the lead single to his album Boogity Boogity. "The Streak" capitalized on the then-popular craze of streaking.

One of Stevens' most successful recordings, "The Streak" was his second number-one hit on the Billboard Hot 100 singles chart in the US, spending three weeks at the top in May 1974, as well as reaching number three on the Billboard Hot Country Singles chart. A major international hit, it also reached number one on the UK Singles Chart, spending a single week at the top of the chart in June 1974. In total it sold over five million copies internationally and ranked on Billboard′s top hits of 1974 at number 8.

== Origin ==
Stevens has stated that he first got the idea for the song while reading a news magazine on an airplane. The magazine included a brief item about streaking, and Stevens thought that it was a "great idea for a song" and started writing notes; later, he wrote some lines after returning home from his trip, but did not complete the song at that time. Some time later, Stevens says he "woke up and it was all over the news. Everywhere you turned, people were talking about streakers". Stevens then rushed to complete and record the song and have it released. According to Stevens, 15 other songs already had been released about streaking by the time his was released, with 35 to 40 such records overall. Stevens had released the song less than a week before the televised 46th Academy Awards, during which Robert Opel created an uproar after he streaked across the stage behind host David Niven.

== Content ==
Each of the three verses starts with a news reporter, played by Stevens, reporting on disturbances at a supermarket, a service station, and a high school gymnasium during a basketball playoff. The reporter interviews a witness at each disturbance, who turns out to be the same man every time (also played by Stevens), describing what he saw and how he tried to warn his wife Ethel to avert her eyes ("Don't look, Ethel!"), but was always too late. After each interview, a chorus is sung by multiple voices, though the chorus is the only part of the song that is actually sung, while the rest is spoken. After the third interview, the man sees the Streak again, and to his horror, Ethel is streaking, too, with the witness yelling: "You get your clothes on", and "Say it isn't so". During and after each chorus, Ray Stevens blows a siren whistle. The laughter was from a recorded laughing machine.

== Music video ==
In 1992, about 18 years after the song's original release, Stevens, using a newly produced version, starred in a music video of "The Streak" as part of a video album called Ray Stevens Comedy Video Classics. The music video remains faithful to the original song's story line, and Stevens again portrays the news reporter and Ethel's husband. An animated version of the Streak (a caricature of Stevens) is featured, while an unidentified actor playing the Streak is briefly shown from the knees down.

The video features "behind the scenes" segments before and after the song: A prim and prudish woman, depicted as being from Standards and Practices (S&P), sternly warns Stevens not to do anything in the video that has to be censored. At the end, after nearly everyone winds up disrobing and joining in with the Streak and (an animated version of) Ethel, the S&P woman, worse for wear, grudgingly admits that Stevens "barely" managed to stay within the confines of decency; after she storms away, Stevens looks into the camera, and imitating Ethel's husband, mutters, "Yeah, I did."

== Belton Richard cover version ==
In 1974, Cajun accordionist and vocalist Belton Richard released "Cajun Streak", a cover version of the song with the lyrics and spoken-word passages translated into Cajun French.

== Remix ==
In 2013, Stevens performed a remix version of "The Streak" live in concert.

== Charts ==
=== Weekly charts ===
Chart (1974)	Peak position
Australia (Kent Music Report)	2
Canadian RPM Top Singles	1
Canadian RPM Country Tracks	1
Canadian RPM Adult Contemporary Tracks	1
Danish Singles Chart	26
German Media Control Charts	43
Irish Singles Chart	2
New Zealand (Listener)	1
UK Singles Chart	1
US Billboard Hot 100	1
US Billboard Hot Country Singles	3
US Billboard Hot Adult Contemporary Tracks	12
US Cash Box Top 100	1

=== Year-end charts ===
Chart (1974)	Rank
Australia (Kent Music Report)	17
Canada	2
UK	23
US Billboard Hot 100	8
US Cash Box Top 100	29

== Certifications ==
Region	Certification	Certified units/sales
United States (RIAA)	Gold	1,000,000^{^}
^{^} Shipments figures based on certification alone.
