= Carl Douglas =

Jamaican-British singer (born 1942)

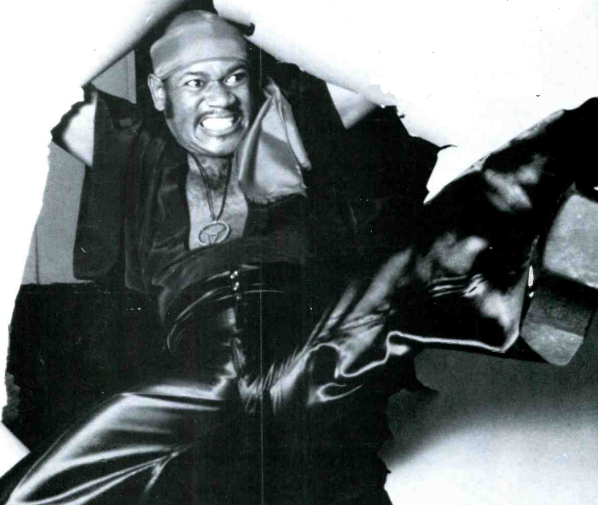
- Douglas in 1974

Background information
- Born: Carlton George Douglas; 10 May 1942 (age 84); Kingston, Colony of Jamaica
- Genres: Disco; soul; novelty
- Occupations: Singer; songwriter
- Instrument: Vocals
- Years active: 1964–present
- Labels: Pye; 20th Century

Carlton George Douglas (born 10 May 1942) is a British-Jamaican singer best known for his 1974 disco single "Kung Fu Fighting". During his career, Douglas released three studio albums, including Kung Fu Fighting and Other Great Love Songs (1974), which peaked at No. 37 on the US Billboard 200 and peaked at the top of the Top R&B/Hip-Hop Albums chart. He also recorded the single "Dance the Kung Fu", and was featured on a remix of "Kung Fu Fighting" by fellow British act Bus Stop. His songs have been covered by Jack Black and CeeLo Green, and have been sampled by Kanye West and Nas.

== Early life ==
Carlton George Douglas was born on 10 May 1942 in Kingston. He later lived in the U.S. state of California before relocating to London as a teenager. He spent his childhood in England playing football, and vocal training. In his youth, he developed a passion for soul music (citing Sam Cooke and Otis Redding as his biggest influences) and a trained tenor voice, which he would display in church singing various religious songs.

== Career ==
=== 1964–1972: Career beginnings ===
In 1964, Douglas released his debut single with the Big Stampede, "Crazy Feeling". Upon its release, the single charted at number 55 on the UK Breakers List. Four years later, in 1968, Douglas released his second single and first single as a solo artist, "Serving a Sentence of Life". The song was followed by "Eeny Meeny" in 1969 and "Somebody Stop This Madness" in 1972. None of the three follow-up singles ever charted.

=== 1974–1975: "Kung Fu Fighting" and Kung Fu Fighting and Other Great Love Songs ===
In August 1974, Douglas released the lead single for his then-upcoming debut studio album, "Kung Fu Fighting", produced by British-Indian songwriter, composer, and producer Biddu. Upon its release, the single was a commercial success. It topped numerous charts worldwide, including the Billboard Hot 100 in the United States and the Official Singles Chart in the United Kingdom. The single sold 11 million copies worldwide, making it one of the best-selling singles of all time. The single was later certified gold by the Recording Industry Association of America on the 27th of November, 1974. It was also certified Gold by the British Phonographic Industry (BPI). The single, which is a homage to martial arts films, overshadowed the rest of Douglas' career, and has led to his appearance on other artists' versions of the song. In the United States, Douglas is considered a one-hit wonder, since he is commonly known only for "Kung Fu Fighting".

The single was followed by the release of Douglas' debut studio album, Kung Fu Fighting and Other Great Love Songs, on the 16th of November, 1974. Upon its release, the album charted at number 37 on the Billboard 200, number 40 on the Australian Albums Chart, and number 48 on the Canadian Albums Chart, and peaked at the top of the Top R&B/Hip-Hop Albums chart. The album was promoted with two more singles. The first, "Dance the Kung Fu", served as a follow-up to "Kung Fu Fighting", and fared only modestly successful, peaking within the top 10 of charts in Belgium, Germany, the Netherlands, and the United States, the latter on their Hot R&B/Hip-Hop Songs chart. The third and final single, "Blue Eyed Soul", only charted at number 25 on the Belgium Singles Chart. Around this time, Douglas was briefly managed by Eric Woolfson, who later became the primary songwriter behind The Alan Parsons Project.

==== Further activities ====
Douglas recorded the song, "Don't You Mess with Cupid", a Steve Cropper and Eddie Floyd composition, which was backed with "Good Hard Worker". Both songs were produced by Pierre Tubbs. The single was released in the UK on the United Artists label in 1975. It was also released in Germany on Bellaphon BF 18 298.

=== 1977–present: Post-"Kung Fu Fighting" ===
In 1977, Douglas released his second studio album, Love Peace and Happiness. The album was accompanied by two singles, including "Shanghai'd" and "Run Back". The latter charted at number 45 on the GfK Entertainment charts and peaked at number 25 on the UK singles chart. Love Peace and Happiness was followed up by Douglas' third studio album, Keep Pleasing Me, in 1978. Douglas remained musically inactive until 1998, when he featured on a re-recording of "Kung Fu Fighting", performed by British dance act Bus Stop. The single was commercially successful, charting at number 8 on the UK singles chart and peaking at the top of the New Zealand singles chart.

"Dance the Kung Fu" was sampled on "Cuda nie widy" from the 2001 album Nibylandia by Polish group Ego, and later by DJ Premier on his 2007 remix of Nike's 25th Air Force One anniversary single "Classic (Better Than I've Ever Been)", featuring American rappers Kanye West, Nas, KRS-One, and Rakim. "Kung Fu Fighting" was later covered by Jack Black and CeeLo Green for the 2008 film Kung Fu Panda. The song would also be covered by The Vamps for the franchise's third installment in 2016. Douglas is currently represented by music publisher Schacht Musikverlage (SMV) in Hamburg, Germany.

== Discography ==
=== Studio albums ===
| Year | Title | Chart positions | | | |
| Year | Title | US | US R&B | AUS | CAN |
|---|---|---|---|---|---|
| 1974 | Kung Fu Fighting and Other Great Love Songs | 37 | 1 | 40 | 48 |
| 1977 | Love Peace and Happiness | — | — | — | — |
| 1978 | Keep Pleasing Me | — | — | — | — |
| 2008 | Return of the Fighter | — | — | — | — |
"—" denotes a recording that did not chart or was not released in that territory.

=== Singles ===
| Year | Title | Chart positions | | | | | | | | | | | | | | | Certifications |
| Year | Title | AUS | AUT | BEL | CAN | FRA | GER | IRE | ITA | NLD | NOR | NZL | SWI | UK | US | US R&B | Certifications |
|---|---|---|---|---|---|---|---|---|---|---|---|---|---|---|---|---|---|
| 1964 | "Crazy Feeling" (with The Big Stampede) | — | — | — | — | — | — | — | — | — | — | — | — | 55 (Note: Chart position is from the official UK "Breakers List".) | — | — | |
| 1968 | "Serving a Sentence of Life" | — | — | — | — | — | — | — | — | — | — | — | — | — | — | — | |
| 1969 | "Eeny Meeny" | — | — | — | — | — | — | — | — | — | — | — | — | — | — | — | |
| 1972 | "Somebody Stop This Madness" | — | — | — | — | — | — | — | — | — | — | — | — | — | — | — | |
| 1974 | "Kung Fu Fighting" | 1 | 1 | 1 | 1 | 1 | 1 | 1 | 3 | 1 | 3 | 1 | 2 | 1 | 1 | 1 | BPI: Gold; RIAA: Gold |
| 1974 | "Dance the Kung Fu" | — | 19 | 8 | — | — | 5 | — | — | 7 | — | — | — | 35 | 48 | 8 | |
| 1974 | "Blue Eyed Soul" | — | — | 25 | — | — | — | — | — | — | — | — | — | — | — | — | |
| 1977 | "Shanghai'd" | — | — | — | — | — | — | — | — | — | — | — | — | — | — | — | |
| 1977 | "Run Back" | — | — | — | — | — | 45 | — | — | — | — | — | — | 25 | — | — | |
| 1998 | "Kung Fu Fighting" (re-issue with Bus Stop) | 15 | — | 22 | — (Note: Although the single did not chart on the Canadian Hot 100, it did peak at number 11 on the Canada Dance/Urban chart.) | 25 | — | 12 | — | — | — | 1 | — | 8 | — | — | ARIA: Gold; BPI: Silver; RMNZ: Platinum |
"—" denotes a recording that did not chart or was not released in that territory.

== See also ==
- List of artists who reached number one on the UK singles chart
- List of artists who reached number one in the United States
- List of artists who reached number one on the Australian singles chart
- List of 1970s one-hit wonders in the United States
