= The Essential John Denver =

Compilation album by John Denver
- Released: February 2007
- Recorded: 1969–1995
- Genre: Folk; country; pop; rock
- Length: 2:16:25
- Label: Legacy
- Producer: Milt Okun, Susan Ruskin, John Snyder, Larry Butler, Barney Wyckoff, John Denver, Roger Nichols

John Denver compilations chronology
16 Biggest Hits (2006)	The Essential John Denver (2007)

Professional ratings
Review scores
Source	Rating
AllMusic	4.5/5 stars

The Essential John Denver is a compilation album of John Denver's songs. Composed of two discs, each containing 18 songs, the album was released in February 2007 as part of The Essential series by Sony BMG. A limited edition was eventually released.

The album peaked at No. 55 on the Billboard Top Country Albums chart.

== Track listing ==
Disc one
No.	Title	Writer(s)	Originally from	Length
1.	"Leaving on a Jet Plane"	John Denver	Rhymes & Reasons (1969)	3:40
2.	"Rhymes & Reasons"	John Denver	Rhymes & Reasons (1969)	3:17
3.	"Take Me Home, Country Roads"	Bill Danoff, John Denver, Taffy Nivert	Poems, Prayers & Promises (1971)	3:12
4.	"Poems, Prayers and Promises"	John Denver	Poems, Prayers & Promises (1971)	4:07
5.	"I Guess He'd Rather Be in Colorado"	Bill Danoff	Poems, Prayers & Promises (1971)	2:09
6.	"Friends with You"	Bill Danoff, Taffy Nivert	Aerie (1971)	3:24
7.	"Rocky Mountain High"	John Denver, Mike Taylor	Rocky Mountain High (1972)	4:45
8.	"Goodbye Again"	John Denver	Rocky Mountain High (1972)	3:38
9.	"I'd Rather Be a Cowboy (Lady's Chains)"	John Denver	Farewell Andromeda (1973)	4:27
10.	"Farewell Andromeda (Welcome to My Morning)"	John Denver	Farewell Andromeda (1973)	4:05
11.	"Sunshine on My Shoulders"	John Denver, Dick Kniss, Mike Taylor	Poems, Prayers & Promises (1971)	5:13
12.	"Back Home Again"	John Denver	Back Home Again (1974)	4:46
13.	"Matthew"	John Denver	Back Home Again (1974)	3:44
14.	"Thank God I'm a Country Boy"	John Martin Sommers	An Evening with John Denver (1975) (Note: The song originally appears in the 1974 album Back Home Again. A live version appears in the 1975 album An Evening with John Denver.)	3:44
15.	"Annie's Song"	John Denver	Back Home Again (1974)	3:02
16.	"Sweet Surrender"	John Denver	Back Home Again (1974)	5:30
17.	"Looking for Space"	John Denver	Windsong (1975)	4:01
18.	"I'm Sorry"	John Denver	Windsong (1975)	3:31

Disc two
No.	Title	Writer(s)	Originally from	Length
1.	"Calypso"	John Denver	Windsong (1975)	3:38
2.	"Fly Away"	John Denver	Windsong (1975)	4:11
3.	"Baby, You Look Good to Me Tonight"	Bill Danoff	Spirit (1976)	2:49
4.	"Like a Sad Song"	John Denver	Spirit (1976)	3:44
5.	"How Can I Leave You Again"	John Denver	I Want to Live (1977)	3:10
6.	"It Amazes Me"	John Denver	I Want to Live (1977)	2:39
7.	"I Want to Live"	John Denver	I Want to Live (1977)	3:49
8.	"My Sweet Lady"	John Denver	Poems, Prayers & Promises (1971)	4:50
9.	"Autograph"	John Denver	Autograph (1980)	3:39
10.	"Some Days Are Diamonds (Some Days Are Stone)"	Dick Feller	Some Days Are Diamonds (1981)	4:01
11.	"The Cowboy and the Lady"	Bobby Goldsboro	Some Days Are Diamonds (1981)	4:38
12.	"Seasons of the Heart"	John Denver	Seasons of the Heart (1982)	3:50
13.	"Shanghai Breezes"	John Denver	Seasons of the Heart (1982)	3:14
14.	"Perhaps Love" (with Plácido Domingo)	John Denver	Seasons of the Heart (1982)	2:58
15.	"Wild Montana Skies" (with Emmylou Harris)	John Denver	It's About Time (1983)	4:05
16.	"Love Again" (with Sylvie Vartan)	John Denver	John Denver's Greatest Hits, Volume 3 (1984)	2:54
17.	"Dreamland Express"	John Denver	Dreamland Express (1985)	4:05
18.	"Is It Love?"	John Denver	The Wildlife Concert (1995)	4:15

Disc three (Limited Edition 3.0)
No.	Title	Writer(s)	Originally from	Length
1.	"Daydreams"	John Denver	Rhymes & Reasons (1969)	2:54
2.	"Everyday"	John Denver	Aerie (1971)	3:15
3.	"For Baby (For Bobbie)"	John Denver	Rocky Mountain High (1972)	2:57
4.	"Grandma's Feather Bed"	Jim Connor	Back Home Again (1974)	2:15
5.	"Aspenglow"	John Denver	Take Me to Tomorrow (1970)	2:06
6.	"It Makes Me Giggle"	John Denver	Spirit (1976)	3:16
7.	"Bet On the Blues"	Tom Paxton	I Want to Live (1977)	3:50
8.	"This Old Guitar"	John Denver	Back Home Again (1974)	2:50

== Charts ==
Chart (2009)	Peak position
Australian Albums (ARIA Charts)	81
