= The Rocky Mountain Collection =

1996 greatest hits album by John Denver

Greatest hits album by John Denver
- Released: April 16, 1996
- Genre: Folk
- Length: 1:12:31
- Label: RCA

John Denver chronology
The John Denver Collection (1995)	The Rocky Mountain Collection (1996)	Reflection: Songs of Love and Life (1997)

The Rocky Mountain Collection is a greatest hits album by the American folk singer John Denver.

== Reception ==
Professional ratings
Review scores
Source	Rating
The Encyclopedia of Popular Music	4/5 stars
MusicHound Rock: The Essential Album Guide	3.5/5 stars

AllMusic reviewer Stephen Thomas Erlewine said the album "features all of John Denver's greatest hits" while also noting that "For those who want to dig deeper than the greatest-hits collections, or want to pass by those individual volumes in favor of one set, The Rocky Mountain Collection is an ideal purchase."

== Track listing ==
All tracks are written by John Denver, except where noted:

Disc one:

1. Leaving on a Jet Plane – 3:37
2. Rhymes & Reasons – 3:13
3. Follow Me – 2:26
4. Aspenglow – 2:08
5. Sunshine on My Shoulders (John Denver, Dick Kniss, Michael Taylor) – 5:11
6. My Sweet Lady – 4:25
7. Take Me Home, Country Roads (Bill Danoff, John Denver, Taffy Nivert) – 4:05
8. Poems, Prayers and Promises – 3:08
9. The Eagle and the Hawk (John Denver, Mike Taylor) – 2:07
10. Starwood in Aspen – 3:04
11. Friends With You (Bill Danoff, Taffy Nivert) – 3:22
12. Goodbye Again – 3:37
13. Rocky Mountain High (John Denver, Mike Taylor) – 4:43
14. I'd Rather Be a Cowboy (Lady's Chains) – 4:23
15. Farewell Andromeda (Welcome to My Morning) – 4:01
16. Back Home Again – 4:42
17. Annie's Song – 2:58
18. Thank God I'm a Country Boy (John Martin Sommers) – 3:07
19. Sweet Surrender – 5:26
20. This Old Guitar – 2:48

Disc two:

1. Fly Away – 4:09
2. Looking for Space – 3:58
3. Windsong (John Denver, Joe Henry) – 3:58
4. Calypso – 3:34
5. I'm Sorry – 3:30
6. Like a Sad Song – 3:41
7. Come and Let Me Look in Your Eyes (John Denver, Joe Henry) – 3:46
8. How Can I Leave You Again – 3:08
9. Thirsty Boots (Eric Andersen) – 4:36
10. It Amazes Me – 2:36
11. I Want to Live (David Byrne, John Denver) – 3:45
12. Autograph – 3:36
13. Some Days Are Diamonds (Some Days Are Stones) (John Denver, Dick Feller) – 3:59
14. Seasons of the Heart – 3:48
15. Shanghai Breezes – 3:11
16. Perhaps Love (John Denver, Plácido Domingo) – 2:56
17. Wild Montana Skies (John Denver, Emmylou Harris) – 4:03
18. Love Again – 2:50
19. Flying for Me – 5:37

== Charts ==
Chart (1997–1998)	Peak position
Australian Albums (ARIA)	49
Belgian Albums (Ultratop Flanders)	38
Dutch Albums (Album Top 100)	18
New Zealand Albums (RMNZ)	19
Scottish Albums (OCC)	9
UK Albums (OCC)	19
UK Physical Albums (OCC)	19
UK Country Compilation Albums (OCC)	1
US Top Catalog Albums (Billboard)	22
US Top Country Albums (Billboard)	50

== Certifications ==
Region	Certification	Certified units/sales
United Kingdom (BPI)	Gold	100,000^{^}
United States (RIAA)	Platinum	1,000,000^{^}
^{^} Shipments figures based on certification alone.

== The Best of the Rocky Mountain Collection ==
The Best of the Rocky Mountain Collection

Greatest hits album by John Denver
- Released: November 28, 2000
- Genre: Folk
- Length: 1:15:33
- Label: RCA

John Denver chronology
John Denver Christmas (1999)	The Best of the Rocky Mountain Collection (2000)	The Very Best of John Denver (2001)

In 2000, a compilation was released to be a "best of" to The Rocky Mountain Collection. It is a single disc compilation that includes most of the biggest hits that are included on The Rocky Mountain Collection.

=== Reception ===
Professional ratings
Review scores
Source	Rating
AllMusic	3/5 stars

In a retrospective review for AllMusic, Al Campbell wrote that it "features several of John Denver's hits from the '70s", and that is a "perfect set for casual listeners."

=== Track listing ===
1. Annie's Song – 2:58
2. Leaving on a Jet Plane – 3:37
3. Take Me Home, Country Roads (Bill Danoff, John Denver, Taffy Nivert) – 3:08
4. Sunshine on My Shoulder (John Denver, Dick Kniss, Michael Taylor) – 5:11
5. Rocky Mountain High (John Denver, Mike Taylor) – 4:43
6. Follow Me – 2:26
7. Back Home Again – 4:42
8. Fly Away – 3:13
9. Rhymes & Reasons – 4:09
10. Starwood in Aspen – 3:04
11. Poems, Prayers & Promises – 4:05
12. This Old Guitar – 2:48
13. Goodbye Again – 3:37
14. Calypso – 3:34
15. I'm Sorry – 3:30
16. Farewell Andromeda (Welcome to My Morning) – 4:01
17. Sweet Surrender – 5:26
18. Love Again – 2:50
19. Thank God I'm a Country Boy (John Martin Sommers) – 3:07
20. Wild Montana Skies (John Denver, Emmylou Harris) – 4:03
