= 16 Biggest Hits (John Denver album) =

Greatest hits album by John Denver
- Released: September 5, 2006
- Genre: Country folk
- Label: Legacy

John Denver chronology
A Song's Best Friend (2004)	16 Biggest Hits (2006)	The Essential John Denver (2007)

Professional ratings
Review scores
Source	Rating
AllMusic	3/5 stars

16 Biggest Hits is a 2006 John Denver compilation album. It is part of a series of similar 16 Biggest Hits albums released by Legacy Recordings.

== Track listing ==
No.	Title	Writer(s)	Length
1.	"Annie's Song"	John Denver	3:03
2.	"Back Home Again"	Denver	4:47
3.	"Baby, You Look Good to Me Tonight"	Bill Danoff	2:50
4.	"Sunshine on My Shoulders"	Denver, Dick Kniss, Mike Taylor	5:15
5.	"Sweet Surrender"	Denver	5:31
6.	"Take Me Home, Country Roads"	Taffy Nivert, Danoff, Denver	3:12
7.	"Rocky Mountain High"	Denver, Taylor	4:46
8.	"I'm Sorry"	Denver	3:34
9.	"Fly Away"	Denver	4:12
10.	"Dreamland Express"	Denver	4:08
11.	"How Can I Leave You Again"	Denver	3:12
12.	"Looking for Space"	Denver	4:01
13.	"Thank God I'm a Country Boy (live)"	John Sommers	3:12
14.	"Leaving on a Jet Plane"	Denver	3:40
15.	"Wild Montana Skies" (Duet with Emmylou Harris)	Denver	4:06
16.	"Some Days Are Diamonds (Some Days Are Stone)"	Deena Kaye Rose	4:01

== Chart performance ==
16 Biggest Hits peaked at #61 on the U.S. Billboard Top Country Albums chart the week of February 24, 2007.

Chart (2006–2007)	Peak position
U.S. Billboard Top Country Albums	61
