= John Denver's Greatest Hits, Volume 3 =

John Denver's Greatest Hits Volume 3

Greatest hits album by John Denver
- Released: November 1984
- Genre: Pop
- Length: 38:17
- Label: RCA Victor
- Producer: John Denver, Barney Wyckoff, Milton Okun (executive)

John Denver chronology
It's About Time (1983)	John Denver's Greatest Hits Volume 3 (1984)	Dreamland Express (1985)

Singles from John Denver's Greatest Hits Volume 3
- 1. "Love Again" Released: October 19, 1984; 2. "The Gold And Beyond" Released: 1984

Professional ratings
Review scores
Source	Rating
Allmusic	4/5 stars

John Denver's Greatest Hits Volume 3 is a compilation album by American singer-songwriter John Denver, released in November 1984. "Love Again" and "The Gold and Beyond" were the new singles from this album.

== Track listing ==
All tracks written by John Denver except "The Gold and Beyond" by Denver and Lee Holdridge and "Some Days Are Diamonds" written by Dick Feller.

Side one
No.	Title	Length
1.	"How Can I Leave You Again?" (from I Want to Live, 1977)	3:10
2.	"Some Days Are Diamonds (Some Days Are Stones)" (from Some Days Are Diamonds, 1981)	4:04
3.	"Shanghai Breezes" (from Seasons of the Heart, 1982)	3:11
4.	"Seasons of the Heart" (from Seasons of the Heart)	3:47
5.	"Perhaps Love" (with Plácido Domingo; from Perhaps Love, 1981)	2:56
6.	"Love Again" (with Sylvie Vartan)	2:53
Total length:		20:01

Side two
No.	Title	Length
1.	"Dancing with the Mountains" (from Autograph, 1980)	3:59
2.	"Wild Montana Skies" (from It's About Time, 1983)	4:03
3.	"I Want to Live" (from I Want to Live)	3:46
4.	"The Gold and Beyond"	2:53
5.	"Autograph" (from Autograph)	3:35
Total length:		18:16
