= The John Denver Collection =

Compilation album by John Denver
- Released: 1995
- Genre: Folk
- Label: Delta

John Denver chronology
Different Directions (1991)	The John Denver Collection (1995)	The Rocky Mountain Collection (1996)

Professional ratings
Review scores
Source	Rating
Allmusic	2.5/5 stars

The John Denver Collection is a 5-CD compilation of the original songs performed by American singer-songwriter John Denver. It was released in 1995.

== Track listing ==
=== The John Denver Collection, Volume 1: Take Me Home, Country Roads ===
1. "Take Me Home, Country Roads" (Re-recording)
2. "Homegrown Tomatoes"
3. "Eagles And Horses"
4. "Ponies"
5. "High, Wide, and Handsome"
6. "Hold On To me"
7. "Whispering Jesse"
8. "Never A Doubt"
9. "Eagle And The Hawk"
10. "I Watch You Sleeping"
11. "For You"

=== The John Denver Collection, Volume 2: Annie's Song ===
1. "Windsong"
2. "Annie's Song" (Re-recording)
3. "Potter's Wheel"
4. "Two Different Directions"
5. "Chained To The Wheel"
6. "A Country Girl In Paris"
7. "All This Joy"
8. "Thanks To You"
9. "The Gift You Are"
10. "I Want To Live"

=== The John Denver Collection, Volume 3: Rocky Mountain High ===
1. "Rocky Mountain High" (Re-recording)
2. "To The Wild Country"
3. "The Chosen Ones"
4. "The Foxfire Suite"
5. "Higher Ground"
6. "Raven’s Child"
7. "Bread And Roses"
8. "Rocky Mountain Suite"
9. "Grandma’s Feather Bed"
10. "The Marvelous Toy"

=== The John Denver Collection, Volume 4: Sunshine on My Shoulders ===
1. "Sunshine on My Shoulders" (Re-recording)
2. "Deal With The Ladies"
3. "Amazon (Let This Be A Voice)"
4. "Eclipse"
5. "Earth Day Every Day (Celebrate)"
6. "Ancient Rhymes"
7. "Tenderly Calling"
8. "Falling Leaves (The Refugees)"
9. "Islands"
10. "Children of the Universe"

=== The John Denver Collection, Volume 5: Calypso ===
1. "Calypso"
2. "The Flower That Shattered The Stone"
3. "American Child"
4. "Postcard From Paris"
5. "In A Far Away Land"
6. "A Little Further North"
7. "Sing Australia"
8. "Alaska And Me"
9. "Stonehaven Sunset"
10. "Potter’s Wheel (Recorded live at Red Rocks Amphitheatre in Denver, Colorado)"
11. "The Flower that Shattered the Stone (Reprise)"
