= Some Days Are Diamonds =

Some Days Are Diamonds may refer to:

- Some Days Are Diamonds (album), a 1981 album by John Denver
- "Some Days Are Diamonds (Some Days Are Stone)", a 1976 song written by Dick Feller
