= Perhaps Love =

Perhaps Love may refer to:

== Film and television ==
- Perhaps Love (1987 film), an Australian film directed by Lex Marinos
- Perhaps Love (2005 film), a Chinese film directed by Peter Chan
- Perhaps Love (2021 film), a South Korean film
- Perhaps Love (TV series), a Chinese reality show
- "Perhaps Love ...," a 1990 episode of A Different World

== Music ==
- Perhaps Love (album), an album by Plácido Domingo with collaboration from John Denver
  - "Perhaps Love" (song), a song by John Denver and title song from the album Perhaps Love
- "Perhaps Love", theme song by Jacky Cheung from the Chinese film Perhaps Love
- "Perhaps Love", a Korean song by Jang Na-ra from her album Sweet Dream
- "Perhaps Love (사랑인가요 [Sarang In Ga Yo])", ending theme song of Princess Hours
