= An Evening with John Denver =

Album by John Denver

Live album by John Denver
- Released: January 29, 1975
- Recorded: August 26–September 1, 1974
- Venue: Universal Amphitheatre (Los Angeles, California)
- Genre: Country; Folk
- Length: 1:24:37
- Label: RCA Victor
- Producer: Milton Okun

John Denver chronology
Back Home Again (1974)	An Evening with John Denver (1975)	Windsong (1975)

Singles from An Evening with John Denver
- 1. "Sweet Surrender" Released: December 1974; 2. "Thank God I'm a Country Boy" Released: March 1975

Professional ratings
Review scores
Source	Rating
Allmusic	4/5 stars

An Evening with John Denver is the first live album by American singer and songwriter John Denver. It was recorded at the Universal Amphitheatre in Los Angeles, California, in August and September 1974. He was backed by an orchestra conducted by Lee Holdridge. Denver's manager, Milton Okun, was the album's music producer.

== Track listing ==
All tracks written by John Denver, except where noted.

Side one
No.	Title	Writer(s)	Length
1.	"The Music Is You"		1:02
2.	"Farewell Andromeda (Welcome to My Morning)"		3:40
3.	"Mother Nature's Son"	Lennon–McCartney	4:37
4.	"Summer"	Denver; Mike Taylor; Dick Kniss	3:02
5.	"Today"	Randy Sparks	4:40
6.	"Saturday Night in Toledo, Ohio"	Sparks	4:08
Total length:			21:09

Side two
No.	Title	Writer(s)	Length
1.	"Matthew"		3:42
2.	"Rocky Mountain Suite (Cold Nights in Canada)"		3:13
3.	"Sweet Surrender"		5:02
4.	"Grandma’s Feather Bed"	Jim Connor	2:37
5.	"Annie's Song"		3:32
6.	"The Eagle and the Hawk"	Denver; Taylor	2:22
Total length:			20:28

Side three
No.	Title	Writer(s)	Length
1.	"My Sweet Lady"		4:55
2.	"Annie's Other Song"		3:05
3.	"Boy from the Country"	Michael Martin Murphey; Owens Castleman	5:00
4.	"Rhymes & Reasons"		3:17
5.	"Forest Lawn"	Tom Paxton	2:58
Total length:			19:15

Side four
No.	Title	Writer(s)	Length
1.	"Pickin’ the Sun Down"	John Sommers; Steve Weisberg	2:17
2.	"Thank God I’m a Country Boy"	Sommers	3:40
3.	"Take Me Home, Country Roads"	Denver; Bill Danoff; Taffy Nivert	3:17
4.	"Poems, Prayers and Promises"		4:40
5.	"Rocky Mountain High"	Denver; Taylor	5:04
6.	"This Old Guitar"		4:47
Total length:			23:45

== Personnel ==
Musicians

- John Denver — vocals, 6- and 12-string guitar
- Dick Kniss — bass
- Herb Lovelle — drums
- Steve Weisberg — lead guitar, pedal steel guitar, resonator guitar
- John Sommers — rhythm guitar, banjo, fiddle, mandolin
- Hal Blaine — percussion

Orchestra

- Lee Holdridge — conductor
- Kris O'Connor — concert director
- Murray Adler
- Samuel Boghossian
- Denyse Buffum
- Gene Cipriano
- Buddy Collette
- Vincent DeRosa
- Assa Drori
- David Duke
- Jesse Ehrlich
- Ronald Folsom
- Allan Harshman
- Richard Kaufman
- Raymond Kelley
- Jerome Kessler
- Milton Kestenbaum
- William Kurasch
- Joy Lyle
- Richard Maximoff
- Peter Mercurio
- Wilbert Nuttycombe
- Jay Rosen
- Ralph Schaeffer
- Sidney Sharp
- Harry Shlutz
- David Schwartz
- Mari Tsumura
- David Turner
- Tibor Zelig

== Charts ==
=== Weekly charts ===
Chart (1975)	Peak position
Australia Albums (Kent Music Report)	4
Dutch Albums (Album Top 100)	20
New Zealand Albums (RMNZ)	1
UK Albums (Official Charts)	31
US Billboard 200	2
US Top Country Albums (Billboard)	1
Chart (1992)	Peak position
Australian Albums (ARIA)	35

=== Year-end charts ===
Chart (1975)	Position
Australia Albums (Kent Music Report)	9
New Zealand Albums (RMNZ)	6
US Billboard 200	7
US Top Country Albums (Billboard)	7
Chart (1976)	Position
New Zealand Albums (RMNZ)	28
