= Out of This World (Johnny Mercer song) =

Single by Jo Stafford with Paul Weston and his Orchestra
- Released: 1945
- Recorded: September 1944
- Genre: Popular song
- Composer: Harold Arlen
- Lyricist: Johnny Mercer

"Out of This World" is an American popular song composed by Harold Arlen, with lyrics written by Johnny Mercer. It was first recorded by Jo Stafford with Paul Weston and his Orchestra in 1944.

It was introduced in the film Out of This World (1945) by Bing Crosby dubbing in for the voice of the main character played by Eddie Bracken.

Alec Wilder describes the Arlen melody as creating a modal feeling (E-flat Dorian) that achieves an unearthly effect. It is unlike his other lyric ballads in that it is one of Arlen's most direct and deliberately unrhythmic melodies—altogether a strong song with splendid support from the Johnny Mercer lyric.

== Notable recordings ==
- Jo Stafford with Paul Weston and his Orchestra - recorded September 1944, released 1945 and reached he Billboard charts with a peak position of No. 9.
- Bing Crosby - recorded December 4, 1944 with John Scott Trotter and His Orchestra.
- Tommy Dorsey and His Orchestra (vocal by Stuart Foster). This charted briefly in 1945.
- Gerry Mulligan - The Concert Jazz Band (1960)
- John Coltrane - Coltrane (1962)
- Cal Tjader (arr. Clare Fischer) - Cal Tjader Plays Harold Arlen (recorded 1960, released 1962; reissued 2002 on CD as Cal Tjader Plays Harold Arlen and West Side Story)
- The Three Sounds - Out of This World (1962 album)
- Sammy Davis Jr. - for his album As Long as She Needs Me (1963)
- Tony Bennett - For Once in My Life (1967)
- Rosemary Clooney - Sings the Music of Harold Arlen (1983)
- Mel Tormé - A Vintage Year (1987)
- Julie Andrews - Love, Julie (1987)
- Tina May – Fun (1993)
- Nancy LaMott - Listen to My Heart (1995 album)
- Roz Corral -Telling Tales (2005)
- Rachael MacFarlane - Hayley Sings (2012)
- Jane Ira Bloom - Sixteen Sunsets (2013)
