= Thought of You =

Thought of You may refer to:

- "Thought of You", a 1983 song by John Denver from his album It's About Time
- "Thought of You", a 2016 song by John Park
- "Thought of You", a 2012 song by Justin Bieber from his album Believe
