= Makin' Whoopee =

1928 song by Gus Kahn and Walter Donaldson

- Sheet music, 1928

Song
- Published: 1928 by Donaldson, Douglas & Gumble
- Released: 1928
- Genre: Traditional pop
- Composer: Walter Donaldson
- Lyricist: Gus Kahn

"Makin' Whoopee" is a song first popularized by Eddie Cantor in the 1928 musical Whoopee!. Gus Kahn wrote the lyrics and Walter Donaldson composed the music for the song as well as for the entire musical.

The title refers to celebrating a marriage. Eventually "making whoopee" became a euphemism for intimate sexual relations. The song has been called a "dire warning", largely to men, about the "trap" of marriage. "Makin' Whoopee" begins with the celebration of a wedding, honeymoon and marital bliss, but moves on to babies and responsibilities, and ultimately on to affairs and possible divorce, ending with a judge's advice.

The original lyrics and music of the song entered the public domain in the United States in 2024.

== Other versions ==
- 1928 Bing Crosby recorded the song on December 22, 1928 with the Paul Whiteman Orchestra. It made #8 on the Billboard charts.
- 1964 Ray Charles released the song as a single on ABC-Paramount, improvising new lyrics and asides.
- 1973 Harry Nilsson recorded the song on his album A Little Touch of Schmilsson in the Night.
- 1980 Yoko Ono under the title "Yes, I'm Your Angel" and with altered lyrics, on the album Double Fantasy.
- 1989 Dr. John and Rickie Lee Jones performed "Makin' Whoopee" on Dr. John's album In a Sentimental Mood. It was released by Warner Bros. Records, earning a Grammy Award in 1989.
- 1989 Branford Marsalis performed a cover in 1989 for his album Trio Jeepy. It would later be the first song that was ever played on VH1 Smooth on August 1, 1998.
- 1989 In a provocative scene from the film The Fabulous Baker Boys, Michelle Pfeiffer accompanied by Jeff Bridges character, performed the song while seductively lying across a grand piano. In reality, the piano was played by Dave Grusin.
- 1996 Cookie Monster performed a parody cover of the song titled “Eating Cookie” in a Season 27 episode of Sesame Street
- 2011 In the Family Guy episode Lottery Fever, Peter makes Joe and Quagmire perform a musical duet of the song for his entertainment while he shoots them with a BB gun.
- 2012 Rachael MacFarlane sang the song on the album Hayley Sings. It was also on an episode of American Dad!

=== Advertising ===
- Pepsi used the melody of "Makin' Whoopee" with new lyrics, sung by Joanie Sommers, for its advertising campaign "Now It's Pepsi -- For Those Who Think Young" starting in 1961.
- Heinz created a 1993 commercial in which a bottle of ketchup and a bottle of salsa "make whoopee" in a refrigerator, resulting in a salsa-style ketchup.
