= I Want to Live =

I Want to Live may refer to:

== Film and TV ==
- I Want to Live!, 1958 film starring Susan Hayward
  - I Want to Live! (1983 film), television remake of the 1958 film, starring Lindsay Wagner
- I Want to Live (1953 film), Mexican crime film
- I Want to Live (1976 film), Austrian film
- I Want to Live (1982 film), Croatian film
- I Want to Live (2015 film), Kurdish film
- I Want to Live (2018 film), Lithuanian film
- I Want to Live (TV series), a 2021 Iranian television series

== Music ==
- I Want to Live (album), a 1977 album by John Denver
- "I Want to Live" (John Denver song), the title song of the John Denver album
- "I Want to Live" (Josh Gracin song), a 2004 song by Josh Gracin
- "I Want to Live" (Skillet song), a 2016 song by Skillet
- "I Want to Live", a song by Gavin Friday from Adam 'n' Eve, later covered by Grace and Naomi Campbell
- "I Want to Live", a song written by Johnny Mandel, from the soundtrack of the 1958 film
- "I Want to Live", a hit single by Greek band Aphrodite's Child 1969

== Other ==
- I Want to Live, a novel by Lurlene McDaniel
- I Want to Live (hotline), a Ukrainian hotline created for Russian soldiers wishing to surrender during the 2022 Russian invasion of Ukraine
