= Love Me Tender (Julie Andrews album) =

Studio album by Julie Andrews
- Released: 1982
- Studio: Sound Emporium Studios
- Genre: Country
- Label: Peach River Records
- Producer: Larry Butler

Julie Andrews chronology
Victor/Victoria (1982)	Love Me Tender (1982)	Love, Julie (1987)

Singles from Love Me Tender
- 1. "Love Me Tender" Released: 1982; 2. "Some Days Are Diamonds" Released: 1983

Love Me Tender is a studio album released in 1982 by English singer Julie Andrews. The album was produced in Nashville by Larry Butler while the artist briefly paused filming The Man Who Loved Women. It was first released in England by Peach River Records with fourteen tracks, while the American edition included ten songs and the Japanese release featured sixteen.

The project began when Julie Andrews' husband, Blake Edwards, suggested a country album as a departure from her usual repertoire. Recorded with Nashville session musicians, it was released by a small label in 1983. The album included the single "Some Days Are Diamonds", which charted in Canada, and a duet with Johnny Cash ("Love Me Tender"), though contractual issues affected its release.

The album reached number 63 in the UK and number 41 in Australia, while selling over 60,000 copies in South Africa. Critical reception varied, with some noting its unconventional pairing of Andrews with country music. She later described the recording process as an enjoyable experience.

== Background and release ==
The project was initiated by Andrews' husband, filmmaker Blake Edwards, who suggested a country-inspired album when the singer revealed she wanted to record an album unlike her past repertoire, moving beyond show tunes and theatrical songs. Andrews was reportedly insecure about how she would be received as a country singer and chose to keep the recording process relatively quiet. The fact that the album was released by a small independent label particularly pleased the singer, who said: "They've given the album the kind of personal attention that I know it would probably have missed had it been released by a major company".

Larry Butler produced the album in Nashville, earlier that year when she briefly stepped away from filming The Man Who Loved Women in Los Angeles. Andrews did not adopt an American Southern accent in the songs, though her vocal performances incorporated stylistic elements associated with country music, such as dropping the final "g" in certain words and using colloquial grammatical constructions, contrasting with the precise pronunciation and clipped British phrasing for which she was known.

The album was first released in England by Peach River Records and distributed by PRT, and includes fourteen songs, the American release by Bainbridge Records offered only ten of the cuts, while the Japanese issue features sixteen songs.

In June 1983, Andrews has flown to London from her Switzerland home for some low-key promotion of the album, about which she had been saying remarkably little. The promotion includes the release of two singles: "Some Days Are Diamonds", a radio only single, which peaked at number 10 on the Canadian RPM Adult Contemporary chart, and the title track, a duet with Johnny Cash, which came about spontaneously when Cash was recording in a neighboring studio. Andrews expressed interest in releasing it as the first single, but contractual issues with Cash's label, CBS Records, prevented it. The "Love Me Tender" single released in UK (BBPR 5) includes two b-sides, "Love Is A Place Where Two People Fall" and "I Still Miss Someone".

When the singer released her ninth studio album, Love, Julie (1987), she talked about the experience with Love Me Tender: "That one is hidden away somewhere (...) But I had a ball doing it. Working with those Nashville musicians was very good for me, a wonderul experience. We just went into the studio and made music".

== Critical reception ==
Professional ratings
Review scores
Source	Rating
AllMusic	3/5 stars
Music Week	2/5 stars

The critic William Ruhlmann of AllMusic called it a "true curiosity" as Julie Andrews' first non-holiday solo album in 20 years and her foray into country music. He wrote that Andrews avoids a Southern accent but adapts to the genre's informal lyrics, showcasing her "beautiful" voice with "calm, distanced affection".

Music Week magazine's critic wrote that although the singer's combination with the country music style may sound strange, she appears on the album with Nashville's best session players.

== Commercial performance ==
Commercially, Love Me Tender peaked at number 63 on the UK Albums Chart, and at number 41 on the Australia's Kent Music Report chart. By 1983, it sold over 60,000 copies in South Africa and was certified triple gold in the country.

== Track listing ==
US edition
No.	Title	Writer(s)	Length
1.	"Crazy"	Willie Nelson	2:45
2.	"Some Days Are Diamonds"	Deena Rose	3:20
3.	"See The Funny Little Clown"	Bobby Goldsboro	3:05
4.	"When I Dream"	Sandy Mason Theoret	3:35
5.	"Another Somebody Done Somebody Wrong Song"	Larry Butler, Chips Moman	2:51
6.	"Love Me Tender" (featuring Johnny Cash)	George R. Poulton, Ken Darby	3:35
7.	"I Wish I Could Hurt That Way Again"	Curly Putman, Rafe Van Hoy, Don Cook	2:50
8.	"The Valley That Time Forgot"	Larry Keith, Mike Snow	3:05
9.	"Blanket on the Ground"	Roger Bowling	3:25
10.	"Love Is A Place Where Two People Fall"		2:55

UK Edition
No.	Title	Writer(s)	Length
1.	"Crazy"	Willie Nelson	2:45
2.	"Some Days Are Diamonds"	Deena Rose	3:20
3.	"See The Funny Little Clown"	Bobby Goldsboro	3:05
4.	"When I Dream"	Sandy Mason Theoret	3:35
5.	"Another Somebody Done Somebody Wrong Song"	Larry Butler, Chips Moman	2:51
6.	"It Was Time"		4:03
7.	"You Don't Bring Me Flowers"	Neil Diamond, Alan and Marilyn Bergman	3:13
8.	"Love Me Tender" (featuring Johnny Cash)	George R. Poulton, Ken Darby	3:35
9.	"I Wish I Could Hurt That Way Again"	Curly Putman, Rafe Van Hoy, Don Cook	2:50
10.	"The Valley That Time Forgot"	Larry Keith, Mike Snow	3:05
11.	"Blanket on the Ground"	Roger Bowling	3:25
12.	"Love Is A Place Where Two People Fall"		2:55
13.	"We Love Each Other"		2:40
14.	"Lyin' In My Arms"		2:58

Japanese edition
No.	Title	Writer(s)	Length
7.	"I Still Miss Someone"	Johnny Cash, Roy Cash	3:38
8.	"You Don't Bring Me Flowers"	Neil Diamond, Alan and Marilyn Bergman	3:13
9.	"Love Me Tender" (featuring Johnny Cash)	George R. Poulton, Ken Darby	3:35
10.	"I Wish I Could Hurt That Way Again"	Curly Putman, Rafe Van Hoy, Don Cook	2:50
11.	"The Valley That Time Forgot"	Larry Keith, Mike Snow	3:05
12.	"Blanket on the Ground"	Roger Bowling	3:25
13.	"Love Is A Place Where Two People Fall"		2:55
14.	"We Love Each Other"		2:40
15.	"We Don't Make Love Anymore"		3:36
16.	"Lyin' In My Arms"		2:58

== Personnel ==
Credits adapted from the liner notes of Love Me Tender record.

- Produced by Larry Butler
- Arranged by Bill Justis
- Engineered by Billy Sherrill, Harold Lee
- Executive-Produced by Gerald T. Nutting
- Backing vocals by James "Buzz" Cason, Dennis Wilson, Diane Tidwell, The Jordanaires, Wendy Suits
- Photographed (album cover) by Greg Gorman

Instrumental

- Bass by Bob Moore, Mike Leech
- Bass guitar by Leon Rhodes, Tommy Allsup
- Drums by Gene Chrisman, Haywood Bishop, Larry London
- Guitar by Billy Sanford, Jerry Shook, Jimmy Capps, Pete Wade, Ray Edenton
- Piano by Bobby Woods, Hargus "Pigg" Robins*
- Steel Guitar by Pete Drake
- Strings by The Nashville String Machine, The Shelly Kurland Strings

== Charts ==
Weekly chart performance for Love Me Tender
Chart (1983)	Peak position
Australian Albums (Kent Music Report)	41
UK Albums (OCC)	63

== Certifications and sales ==
Region	Certification	Certified units/sales
South Africa	3× Gold	60,000
