= Where the Columbines Grow =

State Song of Colorado

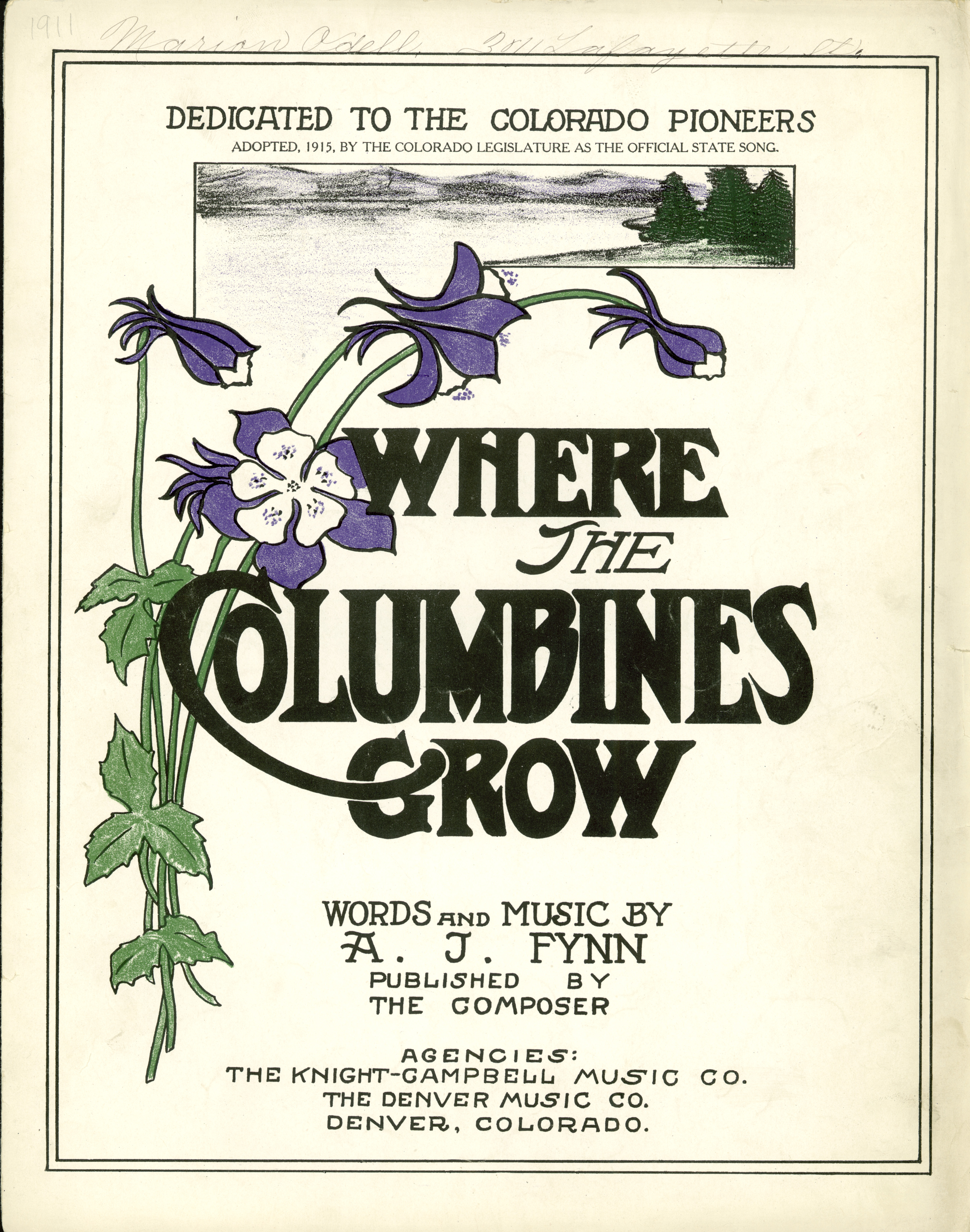
- State song of Colorado
- Lyrics: Arthur John Fynn, 1911
- Music: Arthur John Fynn, 1911
- Adopted: May 8, 1915; 110 years ago
- Succeeded by: Rocky Mountain High (equal status, added 2007)

Audio sample
- Performance of Where the Columbines Grow (first verse and chorus), featuring piano and voice: file; help

Where the Columbines Grow is one of the two official state songs of the U.S. state of Colorado. It was written and composed by Dr. Arthur John Fynn in 1911, and was adopted on May 8, 1915. In the early to mid-2000s, there was debate over replacing Where the Columbines Grow with John Denver's Rocky Mountain High or Merle Haggard's rare song Colorado. In 2007, the Colorado legislature named Rocky Mountain High as Colorado's second official state song, paired with Where the Columbines Grow.

In October 1978, Dave Beadles, then the music director for 740 KSSS in Colorado Springs, petitioned Governor Richard Lamm to temporarily change the state song for Country Music Month to Colorado, written by Dave Kirby. The petition was successful and Kirby was flown to Colorado for the occasion.

== Lyrics ==
Verse 1
Where the snowy peaks gleam in the moonlight,
Above the dark forests of pine,
And the wild foaming waters dash onward,
Toward lands where the tropic stars shine;
Where the scream of the bold mountain eagle,
Responds to the notes of the dove,
Is the purple robed West, the land that is best,
The pioneer land that we love.

Chorus
Tis the land where the columbines grow,
Overlooking the plains far below,
While the cool summer breeze in the evergreen trees,
Softly sings where the columbines grow.

Verse 2
The bison is gone from the upland,
The deer from the canyon has fled,
The home of the wolf is deserted,
The antelope moans for his dead,
The war whoop re-echoes no longer,
The Indian's only a name,
And the nymphs of the grove in their loneliness rove,
But the columbine blooms just the same.

Verse 3
Let the violet brighten the brookside,
In sunlight of earlier spring,
Let the fair clover bedeck the green meadow,
In days when the orioles sing,
Let the goldenrod herald the autumn,
But, under the midsummer sky,
In its fair Western home, may the columbine bloom,
Till our great mountain rivers run dry.

Verse 4 (Note: This verse was written by Fynn in 1921, responding to criticism that the song as originally published did not mention the name Colorado. It has a substantially different voice, perspective, and theme from the first three verses, and is rarely published.)
From the far eastern prairie and lakeland,
From still farther lands by the sea,
Over perilous paths to our mountains,
Came the pioneers, fearless and free.
They came with the bold resolution
A commonwealth here to create,
And the watchword they bore was the name we adore,
Colorado, the columbine state.

== See also ==
- Bibliography of Colorado
- Geography of Colorado
- History of Colorado
- Index of Colorado-related articles
- List of Colorado-related lists
- Outline of Colorado
