= List of Billboard Easy Listening number ones of 1976 =

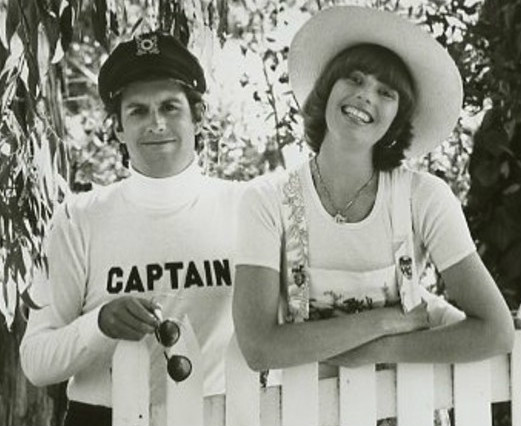
Captain & Tennille had three number ones in 1976.

In 1976, Billboard magazine published a chart ranking the top-performing songs in the United States in the easy listening or middle of the road market. The chart, which in 1976 was entitled Easy Listening, has undergone various name changes and has been published under the title Adult Contemporary since 1996. In 1976, 40 singles topped the chart, then published under the title Easy Listening. Through the issue of Billboard dated February 14, the header of the chart stated that it listed "best-selling middle-of-the-road singles compiled from national retail sales and radio station airplay". In the following week's issue, the reference to retail sales was removed and the header stated that the chart was based on radio airplay only.

Captain & Tennille, John Denver and Olivia Newton-John tied for the most number-one singles in 1976, each achieving three chart-toppers. Captain & Tennille's total of six weeks at number one was the most by any act, and the duo's song "Muskrat Love" had the highest number of weeks at number one by a single, spending four non-consecutive weeks in the top spot; no song spent more than two consecutive weeks at number one during the year. The husband-and-wife duo Captain & Tennille were at the peak of their success in 1976, reaching the top 10 of Billboard's pop chart, the Hot 100, with three singles, extending their run of consecutive Easy Listening number ones to five, and hosting their own variety show on the ABC television network. Their career would go into decline shortly afterwards, however, and they would achieve no further Easy Listening chart-toppers.

A number of Easy Listening number ones of 1976 also topped the Hot 100, including "50 Ways to Leave Your Lover" by Paul Simon and John Sebastian's "Welcome Back", the theme from the television show Welcome Back, Kotter. "Silly Love Songs" by Wings and "Don't Go Breaking My Heart" by Elton John and Kiki Dee topped both charts and were named the top two songs in Billboard's year-end chart of pop singles, although the magazine noted that the soft sounds which had been popular on pop music radio in recent years were beginning to be displaced by the "funkier" sounds of disco and soul. Frankie Avalon was one artist who embraced the increasingly-popular disco style but still received sufficient plays on relevant radio stations to top the Easy Listening chart, as he reached number one with a disco-influenced re-recording of his own 1959 hit "Venus". The final Easy Listening number one of the year was "Torn Between Two Lovers" by Mary MacGregor, which would go on to top the Hot 100 early the following year.

== Chart history ==
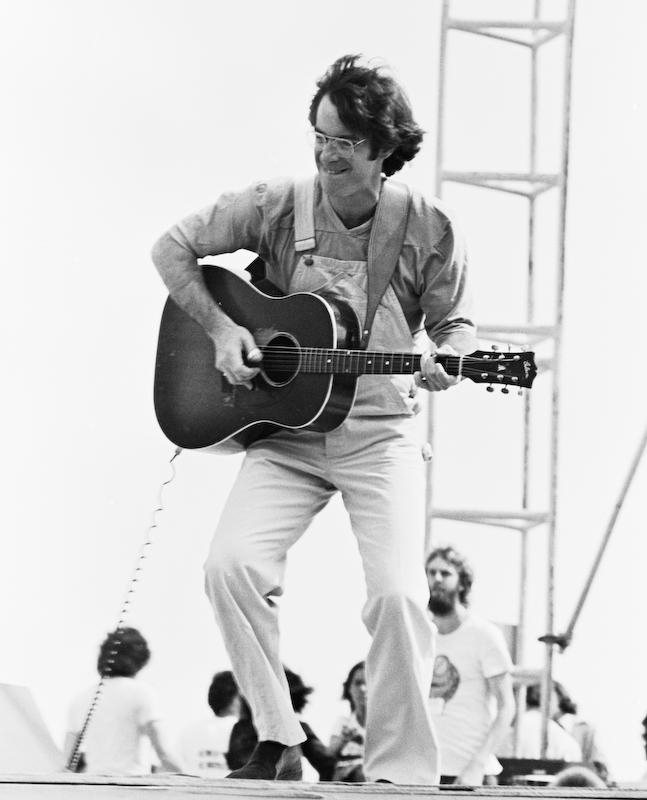
John Sebastian topped the chart with "Welcome Back", the theme from the television show Welcome Back, Kotter.

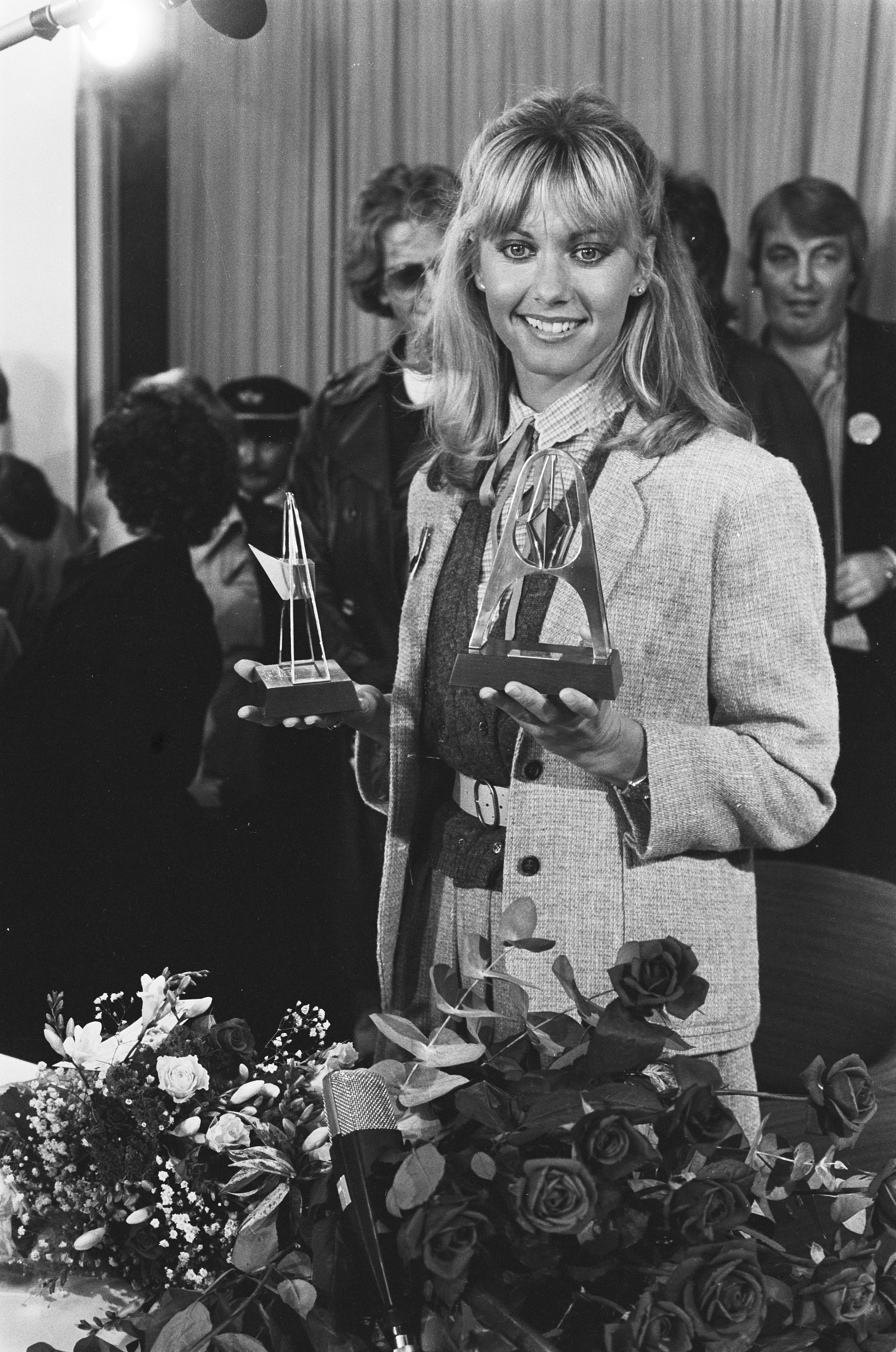
Olivia Newton-John topped the chart with three different singles in 1976.

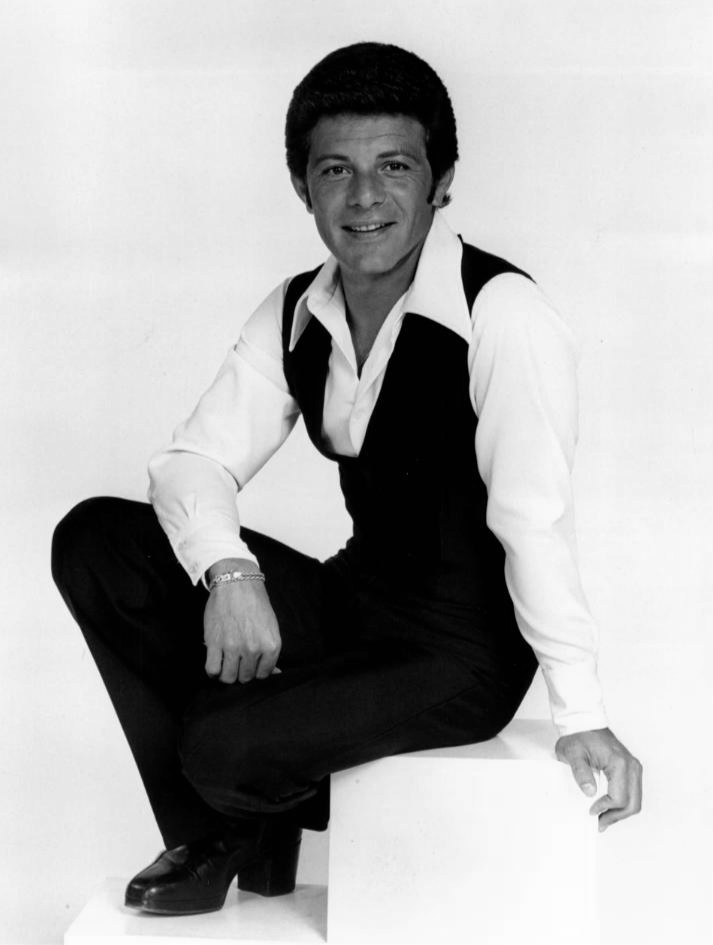
Frankie Avalon reached number one with a re-recording of his 1959 hit "Venus".

Chart history
Issue date	Title	Artist(s)	Ref.
January 3	"Times of Your Life"	Paul Anka	
January 10	"Fly Away"	John Denver	
January 17	"Let It Shine" / "He Ain't Heavy, He's My Brother"^{[a]}	Olivia Newton-John	
January 24	"Let It Shine" / "He Ain't Heavy, He's My Brother"^{[a]}	Olivia Newton-John	
January 31	"Fly Away"	John Denver	
February 7	"Breaking Up Is Hard to Do"	Neil Sedaka	
February 14	"Paloma Blanca"	George Baker Selection	
February 21	"Break Away"	Art Garfunkel	
February 28	"50 Ways to Leave Your Lover"	Paul Simon	
March 6	"50 Ways to Leave Your Lover"	Paul Simon	
March 13	"Lonely Night (Angel Face)"	Captain & Tennille	
March 20	"Venus"	Frankie Avalon	
March 27	"Only Love Is Real"	Carole King	
April 3	"There's a Kind of Hush"	The Carpenters	
April 10	"There's a Kind of Hush"	The Carpenters	
April 17	"Looking for Space"	John Denver	
April 24	"Come On Over"	Olivia Newton-John	
May 1	"Tryin' to Get the Feeling Again"	Barry Manilow	
May 8	"Don't Pull Your Love/Then You Can Tell Me Goodbye"^{[b]}	Glen Campbell	
May 15	"Welcome Back"	John Sebastian	
May 22	"Welcome Back"	John Sebastian	
May 29	"Silly Love Songs"	Wings	
June 5	"Shop Around"	Captain & Tennille	
June 12	"Save Your Kisses for Me"	Brotherhood of Man	
June 19	"Never Gonna Fall in Love Again"	Eric Carmen	
June 26	"Today's the Day"	America	
July 3	"Today's the Day"	America	
July 10	"I Need to Be in Love"	The Carpenters	
July 17	"If You Know What I Mean"	Neil Diamond	
July 24	"I'm Easy"	Keith Carradine	
July 31	"You'll Never Find Another Love Like Mine"	Lou Rawls	
August 7	"Let 'Em In"	Wings	
August 14	"If You Know What I Mean"	Neil Diamond	
August 21	"I'd Really Love to See You Tonight"	England Dan & John Ford Coley	
August 28	"Shower the People"	James Taylor	
September 4	"Summer"	War	
September 11	"Don't Go Breaking My Heart"	Elton John and Kiki Dee	
September 18	"Don't Stop Believin'"	Olivia Newton-John	
September 25	"If You Leave Me Now"	Chicago	
October 2	"I Can't Hear You No More"	Helen Reddy	
October 9	"Like a Sad Song"	John Denver	
October 16	"Fernando"	ABBA	
October 23	"Fernando"	ABBA	
October 30	"Muskrat Love"	Captain & Tennille	
November 6	"Muskrat Love"	Captain & Tennille	
November 13	"This One's for You"	Barry Manilow	
November 20	"Muskrat Love"	Captain & Tennille	
November 27	"Muskrat Love"	Captain & Tennille	
December 4	"After the Lovin'"	Engelbert Humperdinck	
December 11	"After the Lovin'"	Engelbert Humperdinck	
December 18	"Sorry Seems to Be the Hardest Word"	Elton John	
December 25	"Torn Between Two Lovers"	Mary MacGregor	

a. Double A-sided single
b. Medley of two songs

== See also ==
- 1976 in music
- List of artists who reached number one on the U.S. Adult Contemporary chart
