= Love, Julie =

Love, July

Studio album by Julie Andrews
- Released: 3 September 1987
- Genre: Middle of the Road
- Label: USA Music Group
- Producer: Bob Florence

Julie Andrews chronology
Love Me Tender (1982)	Love, July (1987)	A Little Bit of Broadway (1988)

Love, Julie is the ninth studio album by English singer and actress Julie Andrews, released in 1987 by USA Music Group. It marked Andrews' first solo album in five years, with work on the LP beginning two years earlier.

The album originated as a private birthday gift for Julie Andrews' husband, director Blake Edwards, before expanding into a full release at his suggestion. Featuring classic love songs and show tunes with minimal arrangements, it was produced by Bob Florence. Some tracks were incorporated into her 1987 tour setlist.

Critics noted Andrews' strong vocal delivery and the album's intimate warmth, with one praising her live performance of its material. While it didn't chart on Billboard, the album sold over 50,000 copies by 1988, prompting label president Martin Braude to highlight its success as proof of MOR (Middle of the Road) music's commercial viability.

== Background and release ==
The project began as a deeply personal endeavor—a birthday gift for her husband, director Blake Edwards, who turned 65 on July 26, 1987. Reflecting on its evolution, Andrews explained: "The album was originally recorded as a birthday gift for Blake. However, several people heard it and encouraged me. It just kind of grew from there". She added, "Blake suggested fleshing it out a little, and I think some radio stations have picked it up, which is lovely. It's a happy accident."

The album features a collection of show tunes and love songs, including "Come Rain or Come Shine", "Where or When" and "Tea for Two", performed with minimal accompaniment, allowing Andrews' voice to take center stage. Andrews created the album in collaboration with arranger-musical director Bob Florence. An extended version of Florence's original piece, "A Soundsketch", can be heard in the track entitled "Jewels" on his album called Trash Can City. A selection of songs from the album was added in the setlist of the tour the singer was performing that same year.

In 1999, the British budget record label Hallmark Music & Entertainment re-released the album with a new cover and renamed it Tea for Two (catalog No. 309522).

== Critical reception ==
Professional ratings
Review scores
Source	Rating
AllMusic	3.5/5 stars

The critic William Ruhlmann from AllMusic described Love, Julie as "a very warm and intimate record", highlighting Andrews' sincerity and taste as a performer. He noted that, at 52, she is "still in good voice", even when navigating arrangements that may sound "odd to many of her fans". Ruhlmann concluded that the album would make "an excellent Valentine's Day or anniversary present".

Commenting on Andrews's performance at the Chicago Theatre, critic Larry Kart mentioned the album in his column for the Chicago Tribune: "Mightily impressed by Andrews' recent album, "Love, Julie", on which she sings some of the best American popular songs (including "Come Rain or Come Shine") with a caressing intimacy and warmth, this listener votes for the present. And that choice was bolstered by the way she sang "Come Rain" Thursday night-giving an extra little nudge of emphasis to the final word in the line "I'm gonna love you," which suffused the performance with a lovely personal glow".

== Commercial performance ==
Commercially, the album did not chart on Billboard but sold over 50,000 units by July 1988, generating a profit for USA Music Group. Label president Martin Braude wrote that, even with limited airplay and strong competition from youth-oriented genres, its performance served as proof that MOR music could still be commercially viable.

== Track listing ==
No.	Title	Writer(s)	Length
1.	"Out of This World"	Harold Arlen / Johnny Mercer	4:48
2.	"Come Rain or Come Shine"	Harold Arlen / Johnny Mercer	6:24
3.	"Love"	Ralph Blane / Hugh Martin	2:57
4.	"Tea for Two"	Irving Caesar / Vincent Youmans	4:34
5.	"How Deep Is the Ocean?"	Irving Berlin	3:47
6.	"My Lucky Day"	Lew Brown / Buddy DeSylva / Ray Henderson	3:41
7.	"The Island"	Alan Bergman / Marilyn Bergman / Ivan Lins / Vitor Martins	5:14
8.	"A Soundsketch"	Bob Florence	4:01
9.	"So in Love"	Cole Porter	3:20
10.	"Where or When"	Lorenz Hart / Richard Rodgers	3:15
11.	"What Are You Doing the Rest of Your Life?"	Alan Bergman / Marilyn Bergman / Michel Legrand	5:19
12.	"Nobody Does It Better/Nobody Does It Better (Reprise)"	Marvin Hamlisch / Carole Bayer Sager	3:58

== Personnel ==
Credits adapted from the liner notes of the album Love, Julie.

- Executive producer: Martin Braude
- Produced by: Bob Florence
- Arranged by: Bob Florence
- Engineered by: Garry Ulmer
- Recorded at: Village Recorders, Record Plant
- Mastered by: Brian Gardner, Bernie Grundman Mastering

Musicians

- Keyboards: Bob Florence
- Bass: Tom Warrington, Bob Badgley
- Drums/percussion: Nick Ceroli, Mike Stephans
- Guitar: Dennis Budimir
- Cover photos: Zoë Dominic
- Graphic design: PS Design
