= Arthur Sager =

American javelin thrower (1904–2000)

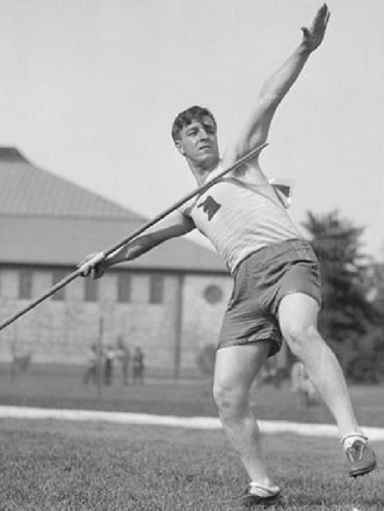
- Sager at Olympic tryouts in the Harvard Stadium in 1928

Personal information
- Born: Arthur Woodbury Sager; July 4, 1904 Gardiner, Maine, U.S.
- Died: January 17, 2000 (aged 95) Boxford, Massachusetts, U.S.
- Relatives: Seth MacFarlane (grandson); Rachael MacFarlane (granddaughter)

Arthur Woodbury Sager (July 4, 1904 – January 17, 2000) was an American track and field athlete who competed in the 1928 Summer Olympics. He finished tenth in the javelin throw competition.

== Early life ==
Sager was born on July 4, 1904, in Gardiner, Maine.

== Career ==
He worked at the Governor Dummer Academy and wrote a book titled Speak Your Way to Success.

He competed in the 1928 Summer Olympics. He finished tenth in the javelin throw competition.

== Personal life and death ==
Sager is the maternal grandfather of Family Guy creator Seth and Rachael MacFarlane through his daughter Ann Perry Sager.

He died on January 17, 2000, in Boxford, Massachusetts.
