= Hayley Sings =

Studio album by Rachael MacFarlane
- Released: September 25, 2012
- Recorded: 2012
- Genres: Smooth jazz; easy listening; soft rock; vocal jazz
- Length: 56:16
- Labels: Girl Singer, Concord
- Producer: Allen Sviridoff

Hayley Sings is the debut album by Rachael MacFarlane, younger sister of Family Guy creator Seth MacFarlane. Produced by veteran producer Allen Sviridoff, the album was released on September 25, 2012. The album's title is an homage to MacFarlane's best-known voice-acting role as Hayley Smith in her brother's series American Dad!. The cover itself also features Hayley.

== Background ==
As a child, both of MacFarlane's parents were music aficionados, passing it on to her and her brother Seth. However, several years ago Rachael had given up her dream of singing professionally, deciding that animation and voice acting would be her primary career and singing would be for her own amusement.

However, during the recording sessions for her brother's future Grammy-nominated debut Music Is Better Than Words, MacFarlane encountered veteran producer Allen Sviridoff (coincidentally, Sviridoff had been the longtime manager for MacFarlane's favorite singer, Rosemary Clooney). Shortly after sending her demo tape, MacFarlane was signed to Concord Records, where she would soon begin work on Hayley Sings.

== Conception and production ==
In addition to the traditional jazz standards MacFarlane has sung for decades, the album contains several songs that MacFarlane "thought about what kind of music Hayley would listen to."

"She's a hippie, a child of the '60s and '70s. When I was growing up, my dad introduced me to groups like Simon and Garfunkel and The Beatles and Crosby, Stills, and Nash. So we decided to run with the idea of re-imagining music from my childhood, which would be appropriate for Hayley to sing."

== Promotion ==
Two songs from the album were heard on American Dad!'s ninth-season premiere "Love, AD Style" that aired on Fox two days prior to the album's release. Nearly four minutes in the episode, Hayley is heard singing "Someone to Watch Over Me" in the shower. However, she is interrupted by Roger barging in; her voice inspires him to hire her as a singer for the attic bar he is opening up. When the performance night comes, Hayley sings another song "Makin' Whoopee!" to the audience's ever-increasing adoration.

== Critical reception ==
Professional ratings
Review scores
Source	Rating
AllMusic	2.5/5 stars
Edge	mixed

The album was met with mixed reviews by critics. In his AllMusic review, Mark Deming, while praising MacFarlane's vocal ability (in particular her simple renditions of "Since You Asked" and "Loneliness"), described most of the selections as being sung with a melodrama which is "embarrassing and overbearing," as well as noting that if the album was truly Hayley Smith singing, it would either "be dominated either by Ani DiFranco tunes, hipster indie rock in the manner of the Arcade Fire, noodle-dance-friendly jam band material, or some combination thereof." Bill Bliss for Edge, while again praising MacFarlane's voice as having "all the qualities associated with a fine chanteuse, a stylish big band vocalist or theatre-trained ingénue," criticized the album's fifteen-track length, as "there is hardly time to zero in on one aspect of her voice before the next selection veers off into another zone of musical territory...Sliced down to seven or eight tracks, 'Hayley Sings' would have kept the animation of Rachael MacFarlane’s true talent intact."

== Track listing ==
No.	Title	Writer(s)	Length
1.	"Makin' Whoopee!"	Walter Donaldson, Gus Kahn	4:09
2.	"Feelin' Groovy (The 59th Street Bridge Song)"	Paul Simon	2:57
3.	"Sooner or Later"	Ray Gilbert, Charles Wolcott	3:33
4.	"Someone to Watch Over Me"	George Gershwin, Ira Gershwin	4:51
5.	"One Fine Day"	Carole King, Gerry Goffin	4:18
6.	"Out of This World"	Harold Arlen, Johnny Mercer	5:09
7.	"Loneliness"	Paul Williams, Kenneth Ascher	3:22
8.	"Never Never Land"	Jule Styne, Betty Comden, Adolph Green	3:57
9.	"Do You Want to Dance?"	Bobby Freeman	3:45
10.	"I'm Glad There Is You"	Jimmy Dorsey, Paul Madeira	2:10
11.	"Up on the Roof"	Goffin, King	3:41
12.	"Since You've Asked"	Judy Collins	3:42
13.	"Time in a Bottle"	Jim Croce	3:45
14.	"All My Loving"	Lennon–McCartney	3:39
15.	"Secret Agent Man"	Steve Barri, P. F. Sloan	3:18
Total length:			56:16
