= Morley Nelson =

American falconer and educator

Morlan "Morley" Nelson (October 5, 1916 – February 12, 2005) was an American falconer and educator. He is best known as a seminal influence on raptor conservation in the Western United States.

== Early life ==
Morlan W. Nelson was born in Barnes County, North Dakota. He was raised on the Sheyenne River, north of Valley City, North Dakota. His parents were from Scandinavian heritage and raised corn, grain, hay, and cattle on a 1,200-acre farm. Nelson became interested in raptors at an early age, especially the peregrine falcon. He graduated from North Dakota State University with a degree in soil science in 1938. During World War II, Nelson was a captain in the 87th Mountain Infantry of the 10th Mountain Division and received a Silver Star, Bronze Star Medal, and a Purple Heart for his bravery and leadership.

== Raptor protection ==
After the War, Nelson continued his work with raptors, and, after relocating to Idaho, became interested in the golden eagle. In 1958, he influenced the Idaho Legislature to enact a law protecting raptors in that state. He worked with many electrical power companies to modify their transmission lines to prevent large raptors like the eagle from electrocuting themselves. He worked on numerous films with Walt Disney, including Ida, the Offbeat Eagle in 1964.

In the 1970s, ABC television and John Denver produced a one-hour documentary with Nelson on eagles and hawks titled The Eagle and the Hawk. The title song was on Denver's album Aerie.

In 1980, he was instrumental in establishing the Snake River Birds of Prey National Conservation Area.

On March 30, 2009, President Barack Obama signed the Omnibus Public Lands Management Act of 2009, PL 111–11, section 2301 of which formally recognized Nelson's contributions by renaming the Conservation Area as the Morley Nelson Snake River Birds of Prey National Conservation Area. Nelson also influenced the establishment of the World Center for Birds of Prey in Boise, Idaho.

Throughout his life, Morley Nelson rehabilitated injured raptors brought to him, including many exotic species. His home in the foothills of Boise was well known as a place to see and learn about all sorts of birds of prey, and he would talk for hours about his passion to anyone who showed interest.

== Partial filmography ==
- Ida, The Offbeat Eagle at IMDB.
- The Vertical Environment by Idaho Public Television.
- PBS Nature (TV program) "John Denver: Let This Be a Voice" final program of John Denver 1997.

== Other sources ==
- Stuebner, Stephen, Cool North Wind: Morley Nelson's Life with Birds of Prey, Caxton Press (September 10, 2002) ISBN 978-0-87004-426-7
