= Aerie (album) =

Studio album by John Denver
- Released: November 1971
- Genre: Country folk
- Length: 38:54
- Label: RCA Victor
- Producer: Milton Okun

John Denver chronology
Poems, Prayers & Promises (1971)	Aerie (1971)	Rocky Mountain High (1972)

Singles from Aerie
- 1. "Friends with You" Released: October 29, 1971; 2. "Everyday" Released: February 18, 1972

Professional ratings
Review scores
Source	Rating
AllMusic	3.5/5 stars
The Village Voice	D

Aerie is the fifth studio album by American singer-songwriter John Denver. It debuted on the Billboard 200 album charts on December 4, 1971, hitting No. 75.

"The Eagle and the Hawk" was used as the title theme music for an ABC documentary of the same name, featuring Denver alongside noted conservationist Morley Nelson.This documentary is in storage at ABC, but it has not been repeated nor released by ABC. Denver's piloting skills in sail planes was shown.

== Track listing ==
Side one
No.	Title	Writer(s)	Length
1.	"Starwood in Aspen"	John Denver	3:04
2.	"Everyday"	Buddy Holly; Norman Petty	3:15
3.	"Casey's Last Ride"	Kris Kristofferson	4:55
4.	"City of New Orleans"	Steve Goodman	3:16
5.	"Friends with You"	Bill Danoff; Taffy Nivert	3:22
6.	"60 Second Song for a Bank, with the Phrase "May We Help You Today?""	Denver	1:03

Side two
No.	Title	Writer(s)	Length
1.	"Blow Up Your TV (Spanish Pipe Dream)"	John Prine	2:21
2.	"All of My Memories"	Denver	4:55
3.	"She Won't Let Me Fly Away"	Bill Danoff	3:40
4.	"Readjustment Blues"	Bill Danoff	4:50
5.	"The Eagle and the Hawk"	Denver; Mike Taylor	2:10
6.	"Tools"	Denver	1:37

== Personnel ==
=== Musicians ===
- John Denver – 6- and 12-string guitar, vocals, arrangements
- Kenneth Boaz – vocals
- Gary Chester – drums, percussion
- Eric Weissberg – banjo, fiddle, pedal steel guitar
- Paul Griffin – piano, organ
- Richard Kniss – bass, arrangements
- George Marge – woodwind
- Paul Prestopino – banjo, dobro, guitar
- Al Rogers – percussion
- Mike Taylor – guitar, dobro, arrangements
- Toots Thielemans – harmonica
- Paula Ballan – vocals
- Diane Kniss – vocals
- Turnpike Tom – vocals
- Alec White – vocals
- Mary Angela White – vocals
- Barbara Carlson – vocals
- Andromeda Quasar – vocals
- Bill Danoff – vocals
- Keith Lane – vocals
- Candy Ledbetter – vocals
- Ron Ledbetter – vocals
- Elizabeth Lindsay – vocals
- Steve Mandell – vocals
- Anne Denver – vocals
- Taffy Nivert – vocals

=== Production ===
- Pat Benson – album photography
- Tom Brown – recording technician
- Jim Crotty – recording engineer
- Ray Hall – mixer, recording engineer
- Pat Martin – recording technician
- Gus Mossler – recording technician
- Milton Okun – producer
- Joe Stelmach – album cover design

== Charts ==
Chart (1972)	Peak position
Australia (Kent Music Report)	48
US Billboard Top LPs	75
