= Windsong =

Studio album by John Denver
- Released: September 19, 1975
- Recorded: July 1975
- Studio: RCA (Hollywood, California)
- Genre: Folk; country
- Length: 42:48
- Label: RCA Victor
- Producer: Milton Okun

John Denver chronology
An Evening with John Denver (1975)	Windsong (1975)	Rocky Mountain Christmas (1975)

Singles from Windsong
- 1. "Calypso/ I'm Sorry" Released: July 1975; 2. "Fly Away" Released: November 1975; 3. "Looking for Space" Released: February 1976

Professional ratings
Review scores
Source	Rating
AllMusic	4/5 stars
Rolling Stone	(mixed)
The Village Voice	C−

Windsong is the ninth studio album recorded by American singer-songwriter John Denver, which was released in September 1975. Denver's popularity was at its peak by this time.

The album contained the songs "I'm Sorry" and "Calypso," which comprised a two-sided hit for Denver in the fall of 1975. "Looking for Space" was dedicated to Werner Erhard, "Two Shots" to Michael P. Shore, "Fly Away", featuring the backup vocals from Olivia Newton-John, and "Calypso" to Captain Jacques-Yves Cousteau and all those who served on his ship, Calypso.

== Track listing ==
=== Side one ===
1. "Windsong" (Denver, Joe Henry) – 3:57
2. "Cowboy’s Delight" (Bob Carpenter, David James Holster) – 3:05
3. "Spirit" (Denver, Henry) – 3:33
4. "Looking for Space" (Denver) – 3:56
5. "Shipmates and Cheyenne" (Denver, Henry) – 3:22
6. "Late Nite Radio" (Bill Danoff, Taffy Danoff) – 2:44

=== Side two ===
1. "Love Is Everywhere" (John Sommers, Denver, Henry, Steve Weisberg) – 3:30
2. "Two Shots" (Denver) – 3:29
3. "I'm Sorry" (Denver) – 3:29
4. "Fly Away" (Denver) – 4:08
5. "Calypso" (Denver) – 3:32
6. "Song of Wyoming" (Kent Lewis) – 3:19

== Personnel ==
- John Denver – vocals, 6 and 12-string acoustic guitars
- Hal Blaine – drums, percussion
- Dick Kniss – double bass
- John Sommers – banjo, acoustic guitar, mandolin, fiddle, backing vocals
- Steve Weisberg – electric and acoustic guitars, pedal steel guitar, electric and acoustic dobros, backing vocals
- Byron Berline – mandolin, fiddle on "Love is Everywhere"
- Mary Ann Duffy – vocals on "Late Nite Radio" and "Love is Everywhere"
- Olivia Newton-John – backing vocals on "Fly Away"
- Jesse Ehrlich – cello on "Windsong"
- John Ellis – oboe on "Windsong"
- Jimmie Fadden – harmonica on "Song of Wyoming"
- Lee Holdridge – arranger, conductor

== Charts ==
=== Weekly charts ===
Chart (1975–1976)	Peak position
Australian Albums (Kent Music Report)	1
Dutch Albums (Album Top 100)	2
New Zealand Albums (RMNZ)	5
UK Albums (OCC)	14
US Billboard 200	1
US Top Country Albums (Billboard)	1

=== Year-end charts ===
Chart (1975)	Position
New Zealand Albums (RMNZ)	15
Chart (1976)	Position
Dutch Albums (Album Top 100)	7
New Zealand Albums (RMNZ)	33
US Billboard 200	26
US Top Country Albums (Billboard)	9

== Certifications ==
Region	Certification	Certified units/sales
Australia (ARIA)	Gold	20,000^{^}
United States (RIAA)	Platinum	1,000,000^{^}
^{^} Shipments figures based on certification alone.
