= Back Home Again (John Denver album) =

Studio album by John Denver
- Released: June 15, 1974
- Studio: RCA (Hollywood, California)
- Genre: Country folk
- Length: 38:08
- Label: RCA Victor
- Producer: Milton Okun

John Denver chronology
John Denver's Greatest Hits (1973)	Back Home Again (1974)	An Evening with John Denver (1975)

Singles from Back Home Again
- 1. "Annie's Song" Released: June 1974; 2. "Back Home Again" Released: September 1974

Professional ratings
Review scores
Source	Rating
AllMusic	4.5/5 stars
Creem	C+

Back Home Again is the eighth studio album by American singer-songwriter John Denver, released in June 1974.

The multi-platinum album reached the top position on the Billboard 200 and contained the hit singles "Annie's Song" (#1 pop, No. 1 adult contemporary), and "Back Home Again" (#5 pop, No. 1 AC, No. 1 country). In addition, the studio versions of "Thank God I'm a Country Boy" and "Sweet Surrender" appear on this album.

The song "Grandma's Feather Bed" was written by banjoist Jim Connor, of the New Kingston Trio, based on a verse he wrote for his grandmother. Denver first heard Connor playing the song in 1968. Connor played on Denver's recording, and toured with the singer.

The song "The Music Is You" is a bonus track on the 1998 reissue of Rocky Mountain Christmas.

On the cover, John is shown with his then-wife Annie Martell.

== Track listing ==
All tracks written by John Denver, except where noted.

Side one
No.	Title	Writer(s)	Length
1.	"Back Home Again"		4:42
2.	"On the Road"	Carl Franzen	2:33
3.	"Grandma's Feather Bed"	Jim Connor	2:15
4.	"Matthew"		3:43
5.	"Thank God I'm a Country Boy"	John Sommers	3:06
6.	"The Music Is You"		1:26

Side two
No.	Title	Writer(s)	Length
1.	"Annie's Song"		2:58
2.	"It's Up to You"	Steve Weisberg	2:26
3.	"Cool an' Green an' Shady"	Denver; Joe Henry	3:07
4.	"Eclipse"		3:41
5.	"Sweet Surrender"		5:29
6.	"This Old Guitar"		2:50

== Personnel ==
- John Denver – 6 & 12-string acoustic guitars, vocals
- Buddy Collette – clarinet
- Jim Gordon – drums, percussion
- Hal Blaine – drums, percussion
- Jim Connor – banjo, harmonica, vocals
- Julie Connor – vocals
- Glen Hardin – piano
- Lee Holdridge – orchestral arrangements
- David Jackson – bass
- Dick Kniss – bass
- John Sommers – banjo, acoustic guitar, mandolin, fiddle, backing vocals
- Steve Weisberg – acoustic guitar, dulcimer, dobro, backing vocals, arranger

== Charts ==
=== Weekly charts ===
Chart (1974–76)	Peak Position
Australia Albums (Kent Music Report)	2
Dutch Albums (Album Top 100)	3
New Zealand Albums (RMNZ)	14
UK Albums (OCC)	3
US Billboard 200	1
US Top Country Albums (Billboard)	1

=== Year-end charts ===
Chart (1974)	Position
Australia Albums (Kent Music Report)	13
US Billboard 200	90
US Top Country Albums (Billboard)	10
Chart (1975)	Position
Australia Albums (Kent Music Report)	25
New Zealand Albums (RMNZ)	18
US Billboard 200	4
US Top Country Albums (Billboard)	1
Chart (1976)	Position
Dutch Albums (Album Top 100)	42

== Certifications ==
Region	Certification	Certified units/sales
Canada (Music Canada)	Gold	50,000^{^}
United Kingdom (BPI)	Gold	100,000^{^}
United States (RIAA)	3× Platinum	3,000,000^{^}
^{^} Shipments figures based on certification alone.
