= Shanghai Breezes =

Single by John Denver

from the album Seasons of the Heart
- B-side: "What One Man Can Do"
- Released: February 1982
- Genre: Country pop
- Length: 3:12
- Label: RCA
- Songwriter(s): John Denver
- Producer(s): John Denver, Barney Wyckoff

John Denver singles chronology
| "Perhaps Love" (1982) | "Shanghai Breezes" (1982) | "Seasons of the Heart" (1982) |

"Shanghai Breezes" is the title of a popular song by the American singer-songwriter John Denver. Released as a single from his 1982 album Seasons of the Heart, "Shanghai Breezes" would become Denver's fifteenth and final Top 40 hit on the Billboard Hot 100 chart, peaking at No. 31 during the spring of 1982. It also became the singer's ninth and last No. 1 song on the adult contemporary chart.

Record World said that "Denver's light vocals and the playful keyboard accompaniment bespeak a refreshing childlike innocence."

Denver was inspired to write the song while visiting Shanghai, China in the early 1980s.

== Chart performance ==
| Chart (1982) | Peak position |
|---|---|
| Canadian RPM Adult Contemporary Tracks | 1 |
| U.S. Billboard Hot 100 | 31 |
| U.S. Cashbox Top 100 | 25 |
| U.S. Billboard Hot Adult Contemporary Tracks | 1 |

== See also ==
- List of number-one adult contemporary singles of 1982 (U.S.)
