= Perhaps Love (album) =

Studio album by Plácido Domingo
- Released: 1981
- Genres: Pop, opera crossover
- Length: 32:28
- Label: Columbia/CBS
- Producer: Milton Okun

Plácido Domingo chronology
Plácido Domingo Sings Tangos (1981)	Perhaps Love (1981)	Gala Opera Concert (1981)

Singles from Perhaps Love
- 1. "Perhaps Love" Released: 1981; 2. "An American Hymn" Released: 1986

Perhaps Love is a 1981 crossover album by operatic tenor Plácido Domingo. First released in the United States in October 1981, within half a year it had achieved gold record status. It was certified as platinum by the end of the decade. The title song is a vocal duet between Domingo and its composer John Denver. It was released as a single, peaking at #22 on the U.S. Billboard Adult Contemporary chart and #59 on the Hot 100 chart. Never going out of print, the song sold almost four million copies by 2008. The album was released on CD in 1990 and again in 2008.

== Background and impact ==
The album's producer, Milton Okun, encouraged Domingo, a famous Spanish opera singer, to try his hand at recording popular English-language songs. Domingo later recalled, "Milton is the first person who believed I could do that kind of music." The producer also suggested the idea that the tenor collaborate with folksinger John Denver on the album's most successful number, "Perhaps Love." Domingo and Okun went on to make several more recordings together, but Perhaps Love remained the tenor's best-selling album of pop music.

Domingo credited the success of the album with increasing his fanbase, including drawing more new people to his opera performances. He said in 2008: "As an opera singer, you never think of the Billboard list. Without any doubt, it really helped my following records." The album's conductor, Lee Holdridge, considered Domingo and Denver's collaboration on "Perhaps Love" to be the start of the modern operatic pop phenomenon.

== Track listing ==
1. "He Couldn't Love You More"
2. "Sometimes a Day Goes By" (from Woman of the Year)
3. "Annie's Song"
4. "Time After Time"
5. "To Love"
6. "Perhaps Love"
7. "Now While I Still Remember How"
8. "Yesterday"
9. "My Treasure"
10. "An American Hymn" (from East of Eden)

== Charts ==
Chart	Peak position
Netherlands	20
New Zealand	24
UK	17
US	18

== Sales and certifications ==
Region	Certification	Certified units/sales
Austria (IFPI Austria)	Platinum	50,000
Brazil (Pro-Música Brasil)	Platinum	250,000^{*}
Canada (Music Canada)	2× Platinum	200,000^{^}
Chile	Gold	15,000
United Kingdom (BPI)	Gold	100,000^{^}
United States (RIAA)	Platinum	1,000,000^{^}
^{*} Sales figures based on certification alone.^{^} Shipments figures based on certification alone.

== Personnel ==
- Plácido Domingo - vocals
- John Denver - vocals (on "Perhaps Love"), guitar (on "Annie's Song" and "Perhaps Love")
- Lee Holdridge - conductor
