= It's About Time (John Denver album) =

Studio album by John Denver
- Released: November 15, 1983
- Recorded: 1983
- Studio: Criteria (Miami)
- Genre: Country; soft rock; folk rock
- Length: 46:51
- Label: RCA Records
- Producer: John Denver, Barney Wyckoff

John Denver chronology
Rocky Mountain Holiday (1983)	It's About Time (1983)	John Denver's Greatest Hits, Volume 3 (1984)

Professional ratings
Review scores
Source	Rating
Allmusic	3/5 stars

It's About Time is the seventeenth studio album by American singer-songwriter John Denver recorded at Criteria Recording Studios in Miami and released in November 1983. The album featured several notable supporting vocalists, including Patti Austin, Rita Marley (and The Wailers), and Emmylou Harris. "Wild Montana Skies" was the single from this album; members of the Western Writers of America chose it as one of the Top 100 Western songs of all time.

It contains the following dedication from John Denver: "This album is dedicated with great love and respect to the memory of my father, Lt. Col. (Ret.) H.J. "Dutch" Deutschendorf."

== Track listing ==
All tracks composed by John Denver; except where indicated

=== Side One ===
1. "Hold on Tightly" – 4:00
2. "Thought of You" – 4:02
3. "Somethin' About" – 3:44
4. "On the Wings of a Dream" – 5:01
5. "Flight (The Higher We Fly)" (Adapted from the Poem by John Gillespie Magee Jr.; Words: John Gillespie Magee Jr., John Denver and Joe Henry; Music: Lee Holdridge) – 3:16

=== Side Two ===
1. "Falling Out of Love" – 4:56
2. "I Remember Romance" – 5:25
3. "Wild Montana Skies" – 4:02
4. "The Way I Am"^{1}
5. "World Game" – 4:58
6. "It's About Time" (Denver, Glen D. Hardin) – 3:42

^{1}Not featured on cassette version or on original LP.

== Personnel ==
The following information is from the CD insert.

=== Musicians ===
All personnel in this section are credited along with John Denver as arrangers.

- Jerry Carrigan – drums and percussion
- Jerry Scheff – bass
- Glen Hardin – piano, Rhodes, B-3
- James Burton – lead guitars (electric and acoustic)
- Jim Horn – saxophone, flute, recorder

=== Additional musicians ===
- Larry Fast – synthesizer
- Fred Wickstrom – marimbas

==== Muscle Shoals Horns ====
- Harvey Thompson – tenor saxophone
- Charles Rose – trombone
- Harrison Calloway, Jr. – trumpet
  - with Jim Horn – baritone saxophone

=== Background vocals ===
- Patti Austin
- Ullanda McCullough
- Conrad Reeder
- Emmylou Harris on "Wild Montana Skies"

=== Musicians from "World Game" ===
- The Wailers
  - Aston "Family Man" Barrett – bass
  - Carlton "Carli" Barrett – drums
  - Steve Stewart – piano
  - Earl "Wire" Lindo – organ
  - Alvin Patterson – percussion
  - Lloyd "Gits" Willis – guitar
- The I Threes
  - Rita Marley
  - Marcia Griffiths

=== Arrangers ===
- Lee Holdridge – strings
- Patti Austin – background vocals

=== Engineers ===
- Roger Nichols – Recording And Mixing Engineer
- John Slywka – Assistant Engineer
- Patrice Carroll-Levinsohn – Assistant Engineer

== Chart performance ==
Chart (1983)	Peak position
Australia (Kent Music Report)	19
U.S. Billboard Top Country Albums	55
U.S. Billboard 200	61
Canadian RPM Top Albums	92
