= Like a Sad Song =

Single by John Denver

from the album Spirit
- B-side: "Pegasus"
- Released: August 1976
- Genre: Country
- Length: 3:41
- Label: RCA Records
- Songwriter: John Denver
- Producer: Milton Okun

John Denver singles chronology
"It Makes Me Giggle" (1976)	"Like a Sad Song" (1976)	"Baby, You Look Good to Me Tonight" (1976)

"Like a Sad Song" is a song written and performed by the American singer-songwriter John Denver, released as a single from his 1976 album, Spirit. Although it only reached No.36 on the Billboard Hot 100 singles chart, "Like a Sad Song" became Denver's eighth single to reach No.1 on the easy listening chart within the span of three years.

Cash Box said that "Denver handles the ballad on acoustic guitar with sensitive string backing." Record World called it "a soft spoken love song" in which "[Denver's] vocal grabs your attention and holds on until the song's end."

== Chart performance ==
Chart (1976)	Peak position
Canadian RPM Top Singles	63
Canadian RPM Adult Contemporary	4
Canadian RPM Country Tracks	8
U.S. Billboard Hot 100	36
U.S. Billboard Easy Listening	1
U.S. Billboard Hot Country Singles	34

== See also ==
- List of number-one adult contemporary singles of 1976 (U.S.)
