= I'm Sorry (John Denver song) =

Single by John Denver

from the album Windsong
- B-side: "Calypso"
- Released: July 1975 (US)
- Recorded: 1975
- Genre: Country
- Length: 3:32
- Label: RCA Victor
- Songwriter: John Denver
- Producer: Milton Okun

John Denver singles chronology
"Thank God I'm a Country Boy" (1975)	"I'm Sorry" / "Calypso" (1975)	"Fly Away" (1975)

"I'm Sorry" is a song written and recorded by American country-folk singer-songwriter John Denver and released in 1975. It was the final number-one pop hit released during his career. The flip side of "I'm Sorry" was "Calypso", and, like its A-side, enjoyed substantial radio airplay on Top 40 stations.

"I'm Sorry" is an apology for forsaken love. In the lyrics, the singer's love interest has left him and he's still broken up about it weeks later. Even though he tells them he's doing fine, their mutual friends know he's not. The singer confesses "I can't believe you went away." Cash Box said it "is replete with the classic Denver touches: sweet arrangement by Lee Holdridge, and emotive lyrics."

== Chart performance ==
"I'm Sorry" reached number one on the Billboard Hot 100 chart on September 27, 1975, and scored number one on the Easy Listening chart. In Canada, it also reached number one.

Six weeks after topping the US pop charts, the song was Denver's third and final number one on the Billboard Hot Country Singles chart. Billboard ranked it at number 77 on its Hot 100 singles of 1975.

== Charts ==
=== Weekly charts ===
Chart (1975)	Peak position
Australia (Kent Music Report)	7
Canada Top Singles (RPM)	1
Canada Adult Contemporary Tracks (RPM)	1
Canada Country Tracks (RPM)	4
South Africa (Springbok)	8
US Billboard Hot 100	1
US Hot Adult Contemporary Tracks (Billboard)	1
US Hot Country Singles (Billboard)	1

=== Year-end charts ===
Chart (1975)	Position
Australia (Kent Music Report)	60
