= Seasons of the Heart (album) =

Studio album by John Denver
- Released: May 4, 1982
- Genre: Folk-pop
- Label: RCA Victor
- Producer: John Denver, Barney Wyckoff

John Denver chronology
Some Days Are Diamonds (1981)	Seasons of the Heart (1982)	Rocky Mountain Holiday (1983)

Professional ratings
Review scores
Source	Rating
AllMusic	2/5 stars

Seasons of the Heart is the sixteenth studio album by American singer-songwriter John Denver, released in 1982. The singles were "Shanghai Breezes" / "What One Man Can Do" and "Seasons of the Heart."

The album cover is a self-portrait of Denver entering the Purple Cloud Cave in Hangzhou, China.

The singer-songwriter dedicated the album to his estranged wife, Annie, and the album was created as a love poem to her. They divorced the following year

== Track listing ==
All tracks composed by John Denver; except where indicated

=== Side one ===
1. "Seasons of the Heart" – 3:48
2. "Opposite Tables" – 3:56
3. "Relatively Speaking" (Denver, lyrics: Arthur Hancock) – 3:33
4. "Dreams" (Stephen Geyer) – 3:02
5. "Nothing But a Breeze" (Jesse Winchester) – 4:45
6. "What One Man Can Do" – 3:04

=== Side two ===
1. "Shanghai Breezes" – 3:12
2. "Islands" – 3:49
3. "Heart to Heart" – 3:55
4. "Perhaps Love" – 1:53
5. "Children of the Universe" (Denver, Joe Henry) – 4:05

== Personnel ==
- John Denver – vocals, guitar, flute, saxophone
- Musicians: James Burton, Jerry Scheff, Glen Hardin, Jerry Carrigan, Jim Horn, Russell Powell, Denice Brooks, Herb Pedersen, Renée Armand

== Chart performance ==
Chart (1982)	Peak position
Australia (Kent Music Report)	65
U.S. Billboard Top Country Albums	18
U.S. Billboard 200	39
