= Mike Taylor (guitarist) =

American guitarist, songwriter and arranger

Michael C. Taylor (July 21, 1948 – September 5, 2010) was an American guitarist, songwriter, and arranger. After a successful musical career, he became a historian, archaeologist and preservationist. He is widely remembered as a performer and co-writer on John Denver's song "Rocky Mountain High".

== Early life ==
Taylor was born in Fayetteville, North Carolina, the son of Katie Steed and George F. Taylor. As a boy, he and his father collected native American arrowheads and similar artifacts around the area where they lived. As a teenager, he taught himself to play the acoustic guitar. By his late teens and early twenties, he had become the lead guitarist for folk singers in both Fayetteville and New York.

== Musical career ==
Taylor rose quickly in the music world, serving as lead guitarist for Joni Mitchell and similar artists, all before his 21st birthday. Herb Metoyer was one of his early influences and mentors.

He joined The John Denver Band in 1969, and was involved in writing, arranging, and performing such songs as "Rocky Mountain High", "Sunshine on My Shoulders", and "The Eagle and the Hawk".

== "Rocky Mountain High" ==
Taylor was given songwriting and performing credit for this John Denver hit, which is one of the two state songs of Colorado. In an interview, Denver said of the song's creation "Mike sat down and showed me this guitar lick and suddenly the whole thing came together. It was just what the piece needed. When I realized what I had — another anthem, maybe; a true expression of one's self, maybe — we changed the sequencing of the album we'd just completed, and then we changed the album title."

== Historian, archaeologist and preservationist ==
In the early 1970s, he moved to Hilton Head, South Carolina, where his interest in the past was rekindled. He enrolled in the University of South Carolina, studying archaeology and anthropology. He became a research fellow in those fields at the university, and changed his career focus to those areas. In 1985, he and a group of Hilton Head residents began creating what is now called the Coastal Discovery Museum. Taylor became its first director in 1988. He later wrote and narrated Mike Taylor’s History of Hilton Head Island, an audiocassette feature in Southern Living magazine, and a video series about Hilton Head that aired on the History Channel, as well as several similar projects.

In 2002, Taylor was named Executive Director of the South Carolina Battleground Preservation Trust. Among the many accomplishments during his tenure were the preservation of Battery White, a Civil War Confederate fortification near Georgetown; and the confirmation and preservation of Fort Pemberton, a Confederate site on James Island.

Taylor died on September 5, 2010, in Hilton Head, South Carolina at age 62.
