= Some Days Are Diamonds (album) =

Studio album by John Denver
- Released: June 1981
- Studio: Sound Emporium (Nashville, Tennessee)
- Genre: Country folk
- Label: RCA Victor
- Producer: Larry Butler

John Denver chronology
Autograph (1980)	Some Days Are Diamonds (1981)	Seasons of the Heart (1982)

Singles from Some Days Are Diamonds
- 1. "Some Days Are Diamonds (Some Days Are Stone)" Released: May 1981

Professional ratings
Review scores
Source	Rating
Allmusic	3/5 stars

Some Days Are Diamonds is the fifteenth studio album by American singer-songwriter John Denver released in June 1981. The singles released from this album are "Some Days Are Diamonds (Some Days Are Stone)"/"Country Love" and "The Cowboy and the Lady".

== Track listing ==
=== Side one ===
1. "Some Days Are Diamonds (Some Days Are Stone)" (Deena Kaye Rose)
2. "Gravel on the Ground" (Debbie Hupp, Bob Morrison)
3. "San Francisco Mabel Joy" (Mickey Newbury)
4. "Sleepin' Alone" (John Denver)
5. "Easy, on Easy Street" (Johnny Slate, Larry Keith)

=== Side two ===
1. "The Cowboy and the Lady" (Bobby Goldsboro)
2. "Country Love" (John Denver)
3. "Till You Opened My Eyes" (Alan Rush, Randy Cullers, Dennis Linde)
4. "Wild Flowers in a Mason Jar (The Farm)" (Linde)
5. "Boy from the Country" (Michael Martin Murphey, Owen Castleman)

== Personnel ==
- John Denver – vocals, acoustic guitar
- Bill Sanford – electric guitar, mandolin
- Jerry Shook, Jimmy Capps, Ray Edenton – acoustic guitar
- Bob Moore, Leon Rhodes – bass
- Chuck Cochrane, Hargus "Pig" Robbins, Larry Butler – keyboards
- Eddie Bayers, Gene Chrisman, Jerry Carrigan – drums, percussion
- Bobby Taylor – oboe
- Russ Powell - guitar
- Bergen White, Buzz Cason, Diane Tidwell, Sherilyn Huffman – backing vocals
- The Shelly Kurland Strings; arranged by Bill Justis

Technical

- Billy Sherrill, Charlie Tallent – engineer
- Barney Wyckoff, Nancy Michon – production assistance
- Harry Langdon – photography

== Chart performance ==
Chart (1981)	Peak position
Australia (Kent Music Report)	20
U.S. Billboard Top Country Albums	7
U.S. Billboard 200	32
