= Rachael MacFarlane =

American voice actress and singer

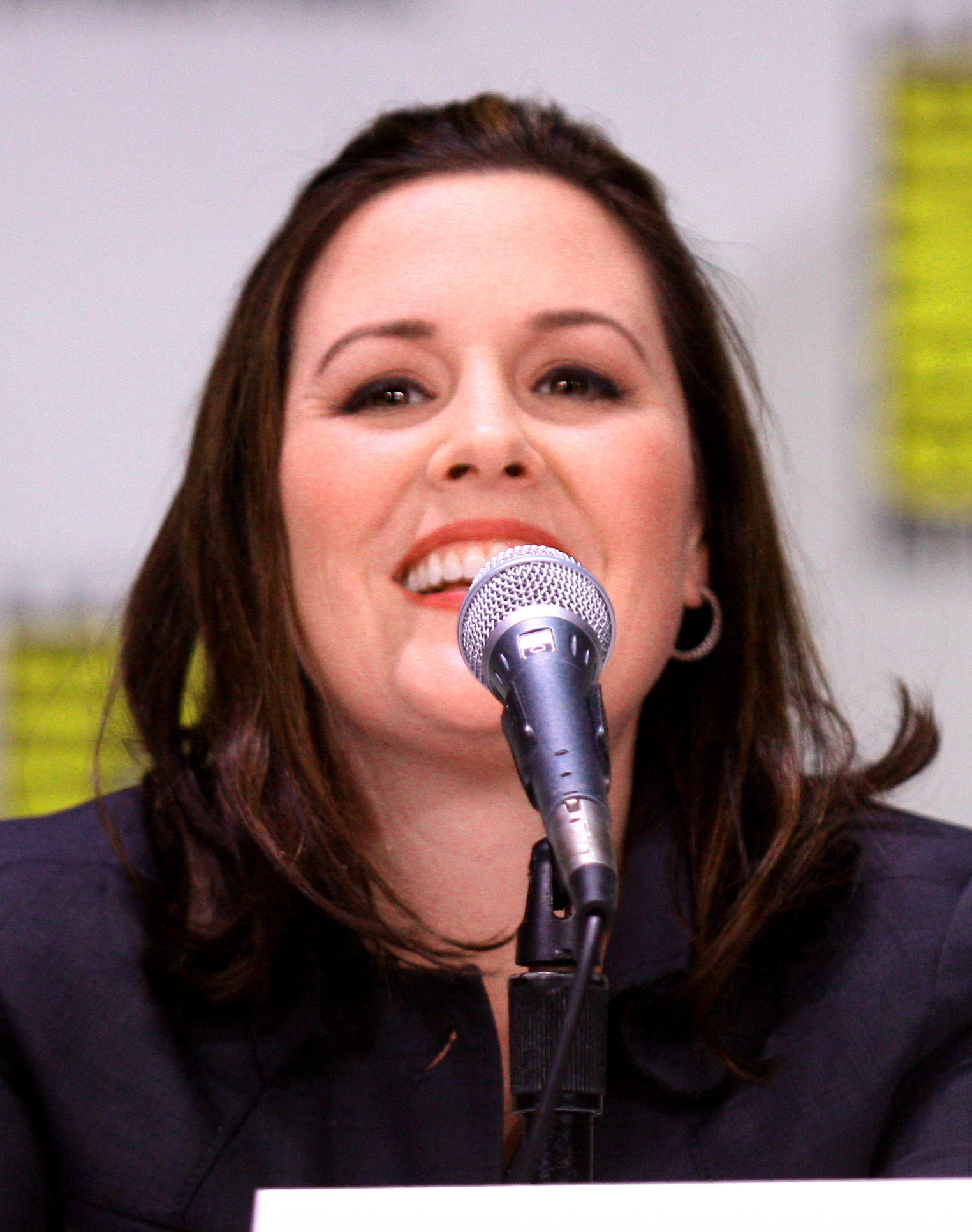
- MacFarlane at the 2011 San Diego Comic-Con
- Born: Rachael Ann MacFarlane; March 21, 1976 (age 50); Kent, Connecticut, U.S.
- Occupation: Voice actress
- Years active: 1997–present
- Spouse: Spencer Laudiero (m. 2008)
- Children: 2
- Relatives: Seth MacFarlane (brother); Arthur Sager (grandfather)

Rachael Ann MacFarlane (born March 21, 1976) is an American voice actress, singer, and author. Her voice credits include Hayley Smith on the animated television show American Dad!, Supreme Leader Numbuh 362 in the television series Codename: Kids Next Door, and Kate Lockwell in the video game StarCraft II. Her older brother is American Dad! co-creator and Family Guy creator Seth MacFarlane.

In addition to voice acting, MacFarlane has also been involved in other aspects of animation, such as being a production manager for The Grim Adventures of Billy & Mandy and Welcome to Eltingville, and she wrote an episode of The Grim Adventures of Billy & Mandy, titled "Educating Grim".

== Early life ==
MacFarlane was born Rachael Ann MacFarlane in Kent, Connecticut on March 21, 1976. Her parents, Ronald Milton MacFarlane (b. 1946) and Ann Perry (née Sager; 1947–2010), were born in Newburyport, Massachusetts. Her older brother is filmmaker, animator, and actor Seth MacFarlane (b. 1973). Her maternal grandfather, Arthur Sager, competed in the 1928 Summer Olympics in track and field. MacFarlane's parents met in 1970, when they both lived and worked in Boston, Massachusetts, and married later that year. The couple moved to Kent in 1972, where Ann began working in the Admissions Office at South Kent School. She later worked in the College Guidance and Admissions Offices at the Kent School, a selective college preparatory school where Ronald also was a teacher.

MacFarlane went to Boston Conservatory but did not graduate before moving to Los Angeles to begin a career in voice acting.

== Career ==
MacFarlane first started voicing characters on Hanna-Barbera shows including Johnny Bravo when she moved to Los Angeles, California. Then after her work with Hanna-Barbera ended, MacFarlane began voicing many characters on Cartoon Network.

In addition to voice acting, MacFarlane has also been involved in other aspects of animation, such as being a production manager for The Grim Adventures of Billy & Mandy and Welcome to Eltingville, and wrote an episode of The Grim Adventures of Billy & Mandy, titled "Educating Grim" – where she also met her husband. Seth MacFarlane asked her to help him with his new pilot for the Fox Broadcasting Company, which would become Family Guy. She remained an incidental cast member on Family Guy for several years, as well as working for both The Walt Disney Company and Cartoon Network. In 2005, she was cast in American Dad!, where she voices Hayley Smith, protagonist Stan Smith’s rebellious teenage daughter.

MacFarlane also continues to contribute to Family Guy on a regular basis. In September 2012, she released her first album Hayley Sings, which is a jazz vocal tribute to Hayley Smith, her character on American Dad!.

MacFarlane and her husband, Spencer Laudiero, have also published picture books for children.

== Personal life ==
MacFarlane married her husband Spencer Laudiero in 2008. Together they have two daughters.

== Filmography ==
=== Film ===
Year	Title	Role	Notes
2005	Inside the CIA	Hayley Smith	Short film
2005	Stewie Griffin: The Untold Story	Katie Couric, Britney Spears	Voice, direct-to-video
2006	Codename: Kids Next Door: The Movie: Operation Z.E.R.O.	Numbuh 362	Voice, television film
2007	Billy & Mandy's Big Boogey Adventure	Two-Headed Parrot	Voice, television film
2007	Billy & Mandy: Wrath of the Spider Queen	Mindy, Velma's Mom, Eris	Voice, television film
2008	Underfist: Halloween Bash	Mindy	Voice, television film
2009	Superman/Batman: Public Enemies	Nightshade	Voice
2010	Lego Atlantis: The Movie	Samantha Rhodes	Voice
2013	I Know That Voice	Herself	Documentary
2014	Elf: Buddy's Musical Christmas	Emily Hobbs	Voice, television film
2015	Ted 2	Meighan Assistant	
2017	Lego DC Super Hero Girls: Brain Drain	Artemiz	Voice, direct-to-video
2017	Top Cat Begins	Lady at Speaker	Voice, English dub

=== Television ===
Year	Title	Role	Notes
1997–2004	Johnny Bravo	Various voices	5 episodes
1999–present	Family Guy	Various voices	Recurring role
2001–2003	Grim & Evil	Mindy, Eris, various voices	Recurring role
2002	The Powerpuff Girls	Girl #1 and #2, Boy	Episode: "Keen on Keane/Not So Awesome Blossom"
2002–2004	Fillmore!	Enid Quintara, Luella Spear	2 episodes
2003–2008	Codename: Kids Next Door	Numbuh 362, Various voices	12 episodes
2003–2007	The Grim Adventures of Billy & Mandy	Mindy, Eris, various voices	Recurring role; also production coordinator
2003	Dexter's Laboratory	Miss Salinger, Cheerleader, Girl	Episode: "Sis-Tem Error/Bad Cable Manners/Dexter's Library"
2003	Static Shock	Nina Crocker / Time-Zone	Episode: "Flashback"
2004	Megas XLR	Gina	Episode: "Dude, Where's My Head?"
2004	Samurai Jack	Mom	Episode: "Jack and the Baby"
2005	What's New, Scooby-Doo?	Connie Crunch, Sugar, Sheila	2 episodes
2005–present	American Dad!	Hayley Smith, various voices	Main role
2007	The Batman	Jane Blazedale	Episode: "White Heat"
2007	The Grim Adventures of the Kids Next Door	Numbuh 362, Mindy	Television special
2008	Can You Teach My Alligator Manners?	Mom, Librarian	2 episodes
2008–2009	Seth MacFarlane's Cavalcade of Cartoon Comedy	Various voices	4 episodes
2011	Winx Club	Chimera	6 episodes; Nickelodeon dub
2011–2022	Robot Chicken	Various voices	5 episodes
2013	Fish Hooks	Wimmamina, Noelle	Episode: "Milo vs. Milo/Everything But the Chicken Sink"
2014	The Tom and Jerry Show	Hildie, Mummy	2 episodes
2015	Turbo FAST	Thora, Queen Tarsa, Abominable Oyster	2 episodes
2016–2018	Sofia the First	Cordelia, Azurine, Mother Fairy, Elfabelle	6 episodes
2017–2019	The Orville	Orville Computer	7 episodes
2018	Fancy Nancy	Madame Lucille	Episode: "La Danse of Friendship/Shoe La La"
2018	Star Wars Resistance	Lin Gaava	Episode: "Fuel for the Fire"
2020–2023	The Owl House	Odalia Blight	6 episodes
2020	Animaniacs	Elizabeth Cady Stanton, Dot's Assistant, Nancy, Urchin, Boss, Jean Gravy	5 episodes
2021	Carmen Sandiego	Madame Goldlove	Episode: "The Big Bad Ivy Caper" (credited as Rachel McFarlane)
2021	Bless the Harts	Dispatcher	Episode: "When You Lose, You Win"
2022–2023	Beavis and Butt-Head	Additional voices	2 episodes
2024–present	Krapopolis	Aphrodite	7 episodes
2024	Ted	Operator	Episode: "Subways, Bicycles and Automobiles"

=== Video games ===
Year	Title	Voice
2006	The Grim Adventures of Billy & Mandy	Eris
2006	Family Guy Video Game!	Various voices
2008	The Incredible Hulk	Vapor
2010	Crackdown 2	Various voices
2010	StarCraft II: Wings of Liberty	Kate Lockwell
2012	Family Guy: Back to the Multiverse	Various voices
2013	StarCraft II: Heart of the Swarm	Kate Lockwell
2014	Family Guy: The Quest for Stuff	Hayley Smith, Various voices
2014	Lightning Returns: Final Fantasy XIII	Olga the Diva
2014	Zorbit's Math Adventure	Serena
2016	StarCraft II: Nova Covert Ops	Kate Lockwell
2022	The Elder Scrolls Online	Guild Magister Valessea
2022	Warped Kart Racers	Hayley Smith (archived recordings)
2023	The Elder Scrolls Online: Necrom	Guild Magister Valessea
2024	The Elder Scrolls Online: Gold Road	Guild Magister Valessea

== Discography ==
=== Studio albums ===
Title	
Hayley Sings	Release date: September 25, 2012; Label: Concord Records; Formats: CD, vinyl LP and digital download
"—" denotes releases that did not chart

== Bibliography ==
- Eleanor Wyatt, Princess and Pirate (Imprint, 2018, illustrated by Spencer Laudiero)
- Harrison Dwight, Ballerina and Knight (Imprint, 2019; illustrated by Spencer Laudiero)
