= Thank God I'm a Country Boy =

Single by John Denver

from the album Back Home Again & An Evening with John Denver
- B-side: "My Sweet Lady"
- Released: March 1975
- Recorded: August 26, 1974
- Genre: Country; soft rock
- Length: 3:13; 2:47 (single edit)
- Label: RCA Victor
- Songwriter: John Sommers
- Producer: Milton Okun

John Denver singles chronology
"Sweet Surrender" (1975)	"Thank God I'm a Country Boy" (1975)	"I'm Sorry" (1975)

Audio video
- "Thank God I'm a Country Boy" on YouTube

"Thank God I'm a Country Boy" is a song written by John Sommers and recorded by American singer/songwriter John Denver. The song was originally included on Denver's 1974 album Back Home Again. A version recorded live on August 26, 1974, at the Universal Amphitheatre in Los Angeles was included on his 1975 album An Evening with John Denver. The live version was released as a single and went to No. 1 on both the Billboard magazine Hot Country Singles and Billboard Hot 100 charts. The song topped both charts for one week each, first the country chart (on May 31), and the Hot 100 chart a week later. Thank God I'm a Country Boy also became the name of a variety special show hosted by Denver in 1977.

"Thank God I'm a Country Boy" was one of six songs released in 1975 that topped both the Billboard Hot 100 and Billboard Hot Country Singles charts. Denver's two-sided hit "I'm Sorry"/"Calypso" also received that distinction.

== Background ==
The song was written by John Sommers, a guitar/banjo/fiddle/mandolin player in Denver's backup band, on New Year's Eve 1973 when he was driving from his home in Aspen, Colorado to Los Angeles.

== Content ==
Sommers recalls that at the time he was feeling “peaceful, happy and content” with his lot in life, and started scribbling some notes about his blissful state along the way. They served as the inspiration for the song.

== Structure ==
The song is in cut (2/2) time that is typical of two-step. Both the verse and chorus comprise eight measures with 3/2 added between the first four measures and last three measures. The instrumental breaks in the song incorporate a violin playing the old-time fiddle tune "Sally Goodin", which is also referenced in the song's lyrics: "I'd play Sally Goodin all day if I could...."

== Charts ==
=== John Denver version ===
Chart (1975)	Peak position
Canada Top Singles (RPM)	1
Canada Adult Contemporary Tracks (RPM)	1
Canada Country Tracks (RPM)	1
US Billboard Hot 100	1
US Adult Contemporary (Billboard)	5
US Hot Country Songs (Billboard)	1
Yugoslavian Singles Charts	1

==== Year-end charts ====
Chart (1975)	Position
US Billboard Hot 100	11
US Hot Country Songs (Billboard)	44

== Certifications ==
Region	Certification	Certified units/sales
New Zealand (RMNZ) John Denver Version	Platinum	30,000^{‡}
^{‡} Sales+streaming figures based on certification alone.

=== Billy Dean version ===
Chart (2004)	Peak position
US Hot Country Songs (Billboard)	27

== Cover versions ==
- A cover version was released by country music artist Billy Dean in 2004; Dean's cover peaked at No. 27 on the Billboard U.S. Hot Country Singles & Tracks charts.
- A Western version was recorded by Alvin and the Chipmunks for their 1981 album Urban Chipmunk.
- Canadian country music artist Brad Johner did a cover on his 2003 album Free.
- Canadian Country rock group The Road Hammers recorded a version for their 2009 album The Road Hammers II.
- Hampton the Hampster performed a cover of the song on Hampsterdance Hits in 2001. It became Hampton's second top-20 hit in Australia, where it peaked at number 12 on the ARIA Singles Chart for two weeks in May and June 2001. It was Australia's 81st-most-successful single of 2001.
- Christian group Point of Grace has been performing a cover of the song in recent concerts, calling it "Thank God I'm a Country Girl."
- Australian Lee Kernaghan performs a cover of the song.
- Swedish eurodance/pop band Rednex recorded cover as B-side song for their 2008 single "Football Is Our Religion"
- Dolly Parton has occasionally performed a bluegrass arrangement of the song in her concerts; she also performed the song on an episode of her mid-70s variety show Dolly!
- The a cappella group Home Free released a cover of the song in 2016.

== In popular culture ==
- The song has been played during the seventh inning stretch at Baltimore Orioles home games beginning in the summer of 1975 and without interruption since 1994. Denver performed it in person atop the Orioles dugout in Game 1 of the 1983 World Series and again fourteen years later during a 12–8 victory over the Detroit Tigers on September 20, 1997, just 22 days prior to his death. The song is also played during the seventh-inning stretch at Atlanta Braves, Buffalo Bisons, and Vanderbilt Commodores games. It is also played regularly at Montana Grizzlies, Washington Glory, Calgary Flames, Ottawa Senators, Toronto Maple Leafs, Colorado Avalanche, St. Louis Blues, Spokane Chiefs, Hagerstown Suns, Delmarva Shorebirds and Spokane Indians home games.
- The American version Country Bear Vacation Hoedown has used the song "Thank God I'm a Country Bear" as the show's finale.
- In Stephen King's novel The Dead Zone, "Thank God I'm a Country Boy" is played at a televised rally for rising politician and antagonist Greg Stillson.
- Jim Nabors performed "Thank God I'm a Country Boy" when he appeared on The Muppet Show in 1976.
- Ann B. Davis performed "Thank God I'm a Country Boy" as "Thank God I'm a Country Girl" on The Brady Bunch Hour Episode 8, released on April 25, 1977.
- Loretta Lynn performed "Thank God I'm a Country Boy" as "Thank God I'm a Country Girl" on Fantasy Island Season 6 Episode 8, released on December 11, 1982.
- Featured in the stage musical, Priscilla Queen of the Desert – the Musical
- The song was parodied by the Capitol Steps during the Iran-Contra Scandal as "Thank God I'm A Contra Boy" featuring Oliver North.
- The song was used during a scene in Son in Law when Pauly Shore's character, "Crawl", has a combine go out of control and spell his name on the farmland while singing along to the 8-track tape playing in the cab.
- The song appears in a 2021 TV commercial for Airbnb.
- The song was used in the movie The Iron Claw.
