= I Want to Live (John Denver song) =

Single by John Denver

from the album I Want to Live
- B-side: "Tradewinds"
- Released: 1977
- Genre: folk
- Length: 3:48
- Label: RCA Victor
- Songwriter: John Denver

John Denver singles chronology
"How Can I Leave You Again" (1977)	"I Want to Live" (1977)	"Bet on the Blues" (1977)

Audio
- “I Want to Live” on YouTube

"I Want to Live" is a 1978 charting single by John Denver from the album of the same name. Denver wrote the song "I Want to Live" after with folk singer Harry Chapin promoting the idea to President Jimmy Carter for a President's Commission on World Hunger. Denver conceived that the song should be used as the commission's theme song, though the commission produced little more than a report. Denver's interest was spurred by seeing a documentary film by Keith Bloom called The Hungry Planet.
