= Sweet Surrender (John Denver song) =

Single by John Denver

from the album An Evening with John Denver (live version)
- B-side: "Summer"
- Released: December 1974
- Genre: Country
- Length: 2:50 (single version); 5:02 (album version)
- Label: RCA Records
- Songwriter(s): John Denver
- Producer(s): Milton Okun

John Denver singles chronology
"Back Home Again" (1974)	"Sweet Surrender" (1974)	"Thank God I'm a Country Boy" (1975)

"Sweet Surrender" is a song written and recorded by American singer-songwriter John Denver. It was originally recorded for his 1974 album Back Home Again, but was chosen as the lead single from the concert album An Evening with John Denver. "Sweet Surrender" reached No. 13 on the Billboard Hot 100 chart in February 1975, remaining in the Top 40 for eight weeks. It also became his fourth No. 1 on the adult contemporary chart (following "Sunshine on My Shoulders", "Annie's Song" and "Back Home Again").

Following a theme common to many of Denver's songs, the lyrics to "Sweet Surrender" deal with a journey of self-exploration tied to themes of nature and environment. The single version of "Sweet Surrender" has yet to appear on any compact disc or digital reissue, characterized by its lack of applause over the introduction. This can be determined by an audible comparison between RCA Victor PB-10148, the 45 rpm single issue vs. any compact disc containing the song. Compact discs contain either the studio version from the Back Home Again album or the complete, unedited "live" version from An Evening with John Denver. The single version of "Sweet Surrender" is identical to the version aired live on the John Denver TV Special A Family Event on December 1, 1974, on ABC. "Sweet Surrender" was the opening theme song of the 1974 Walt Disney movie The Bears and I. It was covered by the pop/folk band The Seekers and appeared on the Australian release of their 1975 self-titled album.

Billboard described "Sweet Surrender" as a "pretty, melodic cut." Cash Box said that "John Denver's high, clear voice, easy listening guitar stylings and sunny disposition should make this record another hit."

== Chart performance ==
Chart (1974–75)	Peak position
Australia (Kent Music Report)	38
Canadian RPM Top Singles	38
Canadian RPM Adult Contemporary Tracks	1
Canadian RPM Country Tracks	16
U.S. Billboard Hot 100	13
U.S. Billboard Hot Adult Contemporary Tracks	1
U.S. Billboard Hot Country Singles	7
