= Looking for Space =

1976 single by John Denver

Single by John Denver

from the album Windsong
- B-side: "Windsong"
- Released: February 1976
- Genre: Folk, country pop
- Length: 3:56
- Label: RCA Records
- Songwriter: John Denver
- Producer: Milton Okun

John Denver singles chronology
"Christmas for Cowboys" (1975)	"Looking for Space" (1976)	"It Makes Me Giggle" (1976)

"Looking for Space" is a song written and performed by the American singer-songwriter John Denver. Released as a single from his album Windsong, it peaked at No. 29 on the Billboard Hot 100 in April 1976. On the easy listening chart, the song reached No. 1 to become his seventh to top that chart.

Denver described the themes of the song to Billboard magazine: "It's about looking for the definition of who you are, by finding out where you are, not only physically, but mentally and emotionally." He has also credited his training in Erhard Seminars Training as inspiring the lyrics to the song. Denver dedicated this song to Werner Erhard, and it was the theme song for the EST organization.

The song experienced a brief resurgence in popularity in 1987 when it featured prominently in "Limbo," the last episode of Season 7 of the television series Magnum, P.I. The song played in its entirety over the last four minutes of the episode, which had originally been intended to serve as the series finale.

Olivia Newton-John recorded the song in 1976 for her album Don't Stop Believin'. The track remained unreleased until a 2010 Japanese re-issue of the album where it was included as a bonus track.

== Reception ==
Cash Box called the song "another hit" saying, "A self exploratory tune about looking for space, 'to find out who you are'. Denver is the master of this genre and the emotion of this carefully produced tune will appeal to pop, MOR and country radio." Record World said that the song "carries a very personal message that [Denver] conveys in a way that everybody can identify with."

== Chart performance ==
Chart (1976)	Peak position
Canadian RPM Top Singles	63
Canadian RPM Adult Contemporary	4
Canadian RPM Country Tracks	23
U.S. Billboard Hot 100	29
U.S. Billboard Easy Listening	1
U.S. Billboard Hot Country Singles	30

== See also ==
- List of number-one adult contemporary singles of 1976 (U.S.)
