= Back Home Again (song) =

Single by John Denver

from the album Back Home Again
- B-side: "It's Up to You"
- Released: September 1974
- Genre: Country
- Length: 4:42
- Label: RCA Records
- Songwriter: John Denver
- Producer: Milton Okun

John Denver singles chronology
"Annie's Song" (1974)	"Back Home Again" (1974)	"Sweet Surrender" (1974)

"Back Home Again" is a country song written and performed by the American singer-songwriter John Denver. "Back Home Again" was released as a single from his album of the same name in 1974.

== Background ==
"Back Home Again" peaked at number five on the Billboard Hot 100 chart in November of that year; it was Denver's fifth Top 10 hit on the pop chart. "Back Home Again" topped the adult contemporary chart for two weeks. The single was the first of three number ones on the country music chart where it stayed for a single week. The single was certified a gold record by the RIAA. The song won a CMA Award for Denver in 1975 in the category "Song of the Year"; he was also named "Entertainer of the Year" at the same ceremony, prompting country pop singer Charlie Rich to light the envelope on fire after reading that Denver had won—in an apparent insult to Denver's musical style and image.

== Reception ==
Cash Box called it a "laid back and mellow song, with some fine arranging by Lee Holdridge." Record World said it was "well-constructed."

== Chart performance ==
=== Weekly charts ===
Chart (1974–75)	Peak position
Australia (Kent Music Report)	20
U.S. Billboard Hot 100	5
U.S. Billboard Hot Adult Contemporary Tracks	1
U.S. Billboard Hot Country Singles	1
Canadian RPM Top Singles	10
Canadian RPM Adult Contemporary Tracks	1
Canadian RPM Country Tracks	1
South African Springbok Top 20	10

=== Year-end charts ===
Chart (1975)	Peak position
Australia (Kent Music Report)	91
