= Fly Away (John Denver song) =

Single by John Denver

from the album Windsong
- B-side: "Two Shots"
- Released: November 1975
- Genre: Country folk, soft rock
- Length: 4:13
- Label: RCA Records
- Songwriter: John Denver
- Producer: Milt Okun

John Denver singles chronology
"Calypso" (1975)	"Fly Away" (1975)	"Christmas for Cowboys" (1975)

"Fly Away" is a 1975 song written and performed by John Denver featuring vocals by Olivia Newton-John. Released as a single from the Windsong album, it peaked at No.13 on the Billboard Hot 100 chart and spent two weeks atop the adult contemporary chart in early-1976, Denver's sixth No.1 on this chart. The song also peaked at No.12 on the country chart.

== Background ==
The song is an ode to longing for simpler times and a simpler way of life. Record World said that "this ballad contains the unmistakable Denver vocal charm with the added bonus of Olivia Newton-John joining in on the chorus." Citing the song’s lyrics in the second verse, Paul Nelson in Rolling Stone remarked, "The singer acknowledges his average listener in 'Fly Away'."

== Chart performance ==
Chart (1975–76)	Peak position
U.S. Billboard Hot 100	13
U.S. Billboard Easy Listening	1
U.S. Billboard Hot Country Singles	12
Canadian RPM Top Singles	13
Canadian RPM Adult Contemporary	2
Canadian RPM Country Tracks	28

== See also ==
- List of number-one adult contemporary singles of 1976 (U.S.)
