= Calypso (John Denver song) =

Single by John Denver

from the album Windsong
- A-side: "I'm Sorry"
- B-side: "Calypso"
- Released: July 1975
- Genre: Folk, country, soundscape
- Length: 3:36
- Label: RCA Victor
- Songwriter: John Denver
- Producer: Milt Okun

John Denver singles chronology
"I'm Sorry" (1975)	"Calypso" (1975)	"Fly Away" (1975)

"Calypso" is a song written by John Denver in 1975 as a tribute to Jacques-Yves Cousteau and his research ship, the Calypso. It was featured on Denver's 1975 album Windsong.

Released as the B-side of "I'm Sorry", "Calypso" received substantial airplay, enabling it to chart on the Billboard Hot 100. After "I'm Sorry" fell out of the #1 position, "Calypso" began receiving more airplay than "I'm Sorry," thus causing Billboard to list "Calypso" as the new A-side, starting the week ending October 11, 1975. Hence, "Calypso" is itself considered a #2 hit on the Hot 100.

John Denver was a close friend of Cousteau. Calypso was the name of Cousteau's research boat that sailed around the world promoting ocean conservation.

This song features the sounds of ship bells, which is heard in the instrumental introductions before both two verses, in which Milton Okun's orchestral arrangement, featuring strings and winds, are heard mimicking the sounds of the oceans and seas.

== In popular culture ==
A filk song exists in Star Trek fandom (and has been quoted in Chapter 8 of Diane Duane's Star Trek novel The Wounded Sky), based on John Denver's "Calypso," but adapted to the voyages of the Enterprise: "To sail on a dream in the sun-fretted darkness, to soar through the starlight unfrightened alone...."

Additionally, Tom Smith wrote parody lyrics for the song, which he titled "Callisto," referring to a sexual desire for Callisto, originally a villainess in the TV show Xena: Warrior Princess and one of Xena's enemies. After Callisto was redeemed in the Xena stories, he wrote an extra verse and a variation on the refrain that attacked her for having stopped being evil.

In the episode titled "Molly's Out of Town" of Mike & Molly some of the characters sing "Calypso" while they are on the roof of a house.

The song is featured in the 2026 VisionQuest television miniseries from Marvel Television.

== Charts ==
=== Weekly charts ===
Chart (1975–1976)	Peak position
Australia (Kent Music Report)	7
Belgium (Ultratop 50 Flanders)	2
Belgium (Ultratop 50 Wallonia)	36
Netherlands (Dutch Top 40)	2
Netherlands (Single Top 100)	2
New Zealand (Recorded Music NZ)	5
US Billboard Hot 100 I'm Sorry / Calypso	2

=== Year-end charts ===
Chart (1975)	Position
Australia (Kent Music Report)	60
Netherlands (Dutch Top 40)	65
Netherlands (Single Top 100)	76

Chart (1976)	Position
Belgium (Ultratop Flanders)	74

=== All-time charts ===
Chart (1958–2018)	Position
US Billboard Hot 100	242
