= Wild Montana Skies =

1983 single by John Denver and Emmylou Harris

Single by John Denver and Emmylou Harris

from the album It's About Time
- Released: November 1983
- Genre: Country
- Length: 4:02
- Label: RCA
- Producers: John Denver, Barney Wyckoff

"Wild Montana Skies" is a single from John Denver's 1983 album It's About Time, featuring vocals from Emmylou Harris. The song is often highly rated as a Western and Montana-themed song.

== Reception ==
In 2010, the Western Writers of America rated "Wild Montana Skies" as one of the Top 100 Western songs of all time. In 2013, "Wild Montana Skies" won a poll as the "best song about Montana" run by the Great Falls Tribune.

Reception was not entirely positive; the New York Daily News rated the song as the second-worst song with the word "wild" in the title, second only to "Wildfire" by Michael Martin Murphey.
