= Perhaps Love (song) =

Single by Plácido Domingo and John Denver

from the album Perhaps Love
- Released: 1981
- Recorded: 1981
- Genre: Pop
- Label: CBS Masterworks
- Songwriter: John Denver
- Producer: Milton Okun

"Perhaps Love" is a song that John Denver wrote and recorded as a duet with Plácido Domingo. The song appeared on Domingo's 1981 album of the same title. "Perhaps Love" is the only song on the album with Denver's vocals alongside Domingo's. Denver also appears on the album's cover version of his composition "Annie's Song", where he accompanies Domingo on guitar. Released as a single with "Annie's Song" on the B side, "Perhaps Love" peaked at #22 on the U.S. Adult Contemporary chart and #59 on the Billboard Hot 100 in 1982. Remaining in print, the song sold almost four million copies by 2008.

== Background and influence ==
"Perhaps Love" was addressed to Denver's wife Annie Martell (the eponym of his #1 hit "Annie's Song") while they were separated and moving towards a divorce. In an interview the day after Denver's death in 1997, Annie said that this was her favorite song of his, rather than "Annie's Song" (which she also said she enjoyed).

Milt Okun, the album's producer, first suggested that Domingo, an opera singer, pair with the famous folk singer on the song. The producer worked hard to promote the song after its release. An independent radio promoter told Okun at the time, "It's very beautiful, but there's no chance at all of this getting on the air." To both men's surprise, one of the top five radio stations in the United States in Philadelphia began playing the song every hour on the hour, greatly contributing to its success and the willingness of other stations to play it. Okun discussed this with the station owner. The owner told the producer that his "wife was in love with the tenor" as explanation for repeatedly playing the opera singer's record.

Lee Holdridge, who conducted the music on the album, credited the pairing of Domingo and Denver with paving the way for recent "popera" phenomena like the Three Tenors, Josh Groban, and Andrea Bocelli.

== Release ==
"Perhaps Love" was the first single released by CBS Masterworks. Initially, the record company did not intend to release any singles from Perhaps Love, which first came out in September 1981, but decided to after the album unexpectedly sold half a million copies by December. Key representatives of the pop division of the associated company, Columbia Records, promoted the single, as well as the album.

== Later recordings ==
Denver recorded a solo version of the song for his 1982 album Seasons of the Heart. This version also appears as a bonus track on the 1998 reissue of Rocky Mountain Christmas.

Domingo recorded the number with his son, Placido Domingo Jr., on the 2013 album, Great Voices Sing John Denver. Okun and Holdridge collaborated again with the tenor (and other opera singers) on this newer album. The two Domingos also performed the song live at the 2014 iTunes Festival, which was shown on television. Additionally, the elder Domingo sang the duet with tenor Rolando Villazón during a televised concert at Schönbrunn Palace in 2008.

== Chart performance ==
Chart (1981)	Peak position
Canada RPM Adult Contemporary	1
U.S. Billboard Hot Adult Contemporary	22
U.S. Billboard Hot 100	59
UK Singles Chart	46
Irish Singles Chart	26
Dutch Top 40	16
New Zealand Singles Chart	15
South African top 20	11
Belgian Singles Chart (Flanders)	23

== Other versions ==
- An instrumental version of this song appears on flutist James Galway's 1988 album Greatest Hits.
- A duet by Denver and Lene Siel was recorded in 1996 and released on Siel's album Mine Favoritter.
- The song was covered by Jose Mari Chan in a duet with his daughter, Liza.
- Richard Clayderman has also performed an instrumental version of the song on piano.
- A Czech version of the song named "Láska prý" was performed by Karel Černoch and Slovak tenor Peter Dvorský with lyrics by Zdeněk Rytíř.
- The song is the title track of the second album by Jonathan and Charlotte.
- A German version of the song named "Liebe ist..." was performed both by Milva and Tony Holiday.
