= Deena Kaye Rose =

American country musician and songwriter (born 1943)

- Also known as: Dick Feller
- Born: January 2, 1943 (age 83); Bronaugh, Missouri, U.S.
- Genres: Country
- Occupation: Singer-songwriter
- Instruments: Vocals, guitar
- Years active: 1972–present
- Labels: United Artists, Asylum

Deena Kaye Rose (previously Dick Feller; born January 2, 1943) is an American country musician and songwriter. Beginning in the 1970s, she wrote and recorded music for United Artists Records. As an activist, she has given performances and lectures on her experiences as a transgender woman.

== Biography ==
=== Early life ===
Rose was born in Bronaugh, Missouri, United States. On her twelfth birthday, she got her first guitar from her grandfather that was bought at a garage sale. Although it only had one string, she immediately started to tune it. Some time later, she started taking guitar lessons by hitching rides with the local mailman to a neighboring town, and, at fifteen, was playing for dances with a local band. Graduating from high school, she played lead guitar in various rock and blues groups including The Sliders in Pittsburg, Kansas, and surrounding areas. In early 1964, she went to Los Angeles to play in a band and hone her songwriting skills. Having had no particular luck, she returned home to Missouri to continue playing with local bands.

=== Songwriting ===
In 1966, she moved to Nashville, Tennessee and toured with Mel Tillis' The Statesiders, Skeeter Davis, Stu Phillips, and Warner Mack, with whom she also recorded. After sending some songs to Johnny Cash's publishing company, House of Cash, she got a record contract with Columbia Records.

In 1971, Tex Williams recorded her song "The Night Miss Nancy Ann's Hotel for Single Girls Burned Down", which became a Top 30 single in the US. In 1972, Cash got a top five country hit with her "Any Old Wind That Blows".

Jimmy Dean's producer then asked her to write a song for Dean similar to what she wrote for Williams, which became "Lord, Mr. Ford". Dean did not record it, but she took the song to Jerry Reed's publishing company, Vector Music. Reed recorded the song, as well as two of her other songs: "The Lady is a Woman" and "One Sweet Reason". "Lord, Mr. Ford" was a number one hit for Reed in 1973.

=== Recording debut ===
In 1973, she made her own recording debut with the single "Biff, The Friendly Purple Bear", made it to the Top 25. She released her first album, Dick Feller Wrote... a few months later through United Artists. Her next single, the humorous "The Credit Card Song", peaked in the Top Ten. In 1974, she signed with Asylum Records. Her first release for the label was the single "Makin' the Best of a Bad Situation", which made it to the Top 15. These three records also crossed to the Billboard Hot 100 or Bubbling Under The Top 100, and Easy Listening Top 50.

She continued writing songs and playing guitar on the records of other contemporary artists, such as Jerry Jeff Walker, Guy Clark, and Mike Auldridge. At the same time, she also made some more of her own recordings. In 1975, she had her last chart entry as a performer, with the song "Uncle Hiram and His Homemade Beer", which made it to the Top 50.

She teamed up with Jerry Reed to write songs for the Smokey and the Bandit soundtrack in 1977, with Reed's vocal of "East Bound and Down" reaching No. 2 on the U.S. country chart.

Her first overseas tour was made in 1980, and, the next year, she played with The Kelvin Henderson Band and Country Couples in England, Scotland, and the Netherlands. In 1981, John Denver recorded a country pop hit with her "Some Days Are Diamonds (Some Days Are Stone)", which Bobby Bare had previously recorded.

Together with Don Schlitz, she composed songs for the movies Smokey and The Bandit 3 and Alamo Bay. For several years after, she wrote and toured with Lewis Grizzard as opening attraction for the Evening With Lewis Grizzard stage show. She wrote songs and backed Grizzard on 1991's Don't Believe I'da Told That (billed by Grizzard as "the Dick Feller Trio"), and also co-produced Grizzard's 1994 album Alimony: The Bill You Get, for the Thrill You Got.

She wrote many songs with Sheb Wooley on the album Kickin' Asphalt, which was released in November 1999. Del Reeves performed another Feller–Wooley composition on the same album.

Through the years, she has also written and performed a number of commercials for different companies and products, such as the Dodge television commercials "Do You Like Trucks?" and "Little Boy's Dream" and the Pepsi jingle "By Any Other Name". She has also made commercials for AT&T calling cards, Beech-Nut tobacco, Colgate-Palmolive, and Ponderosa Steakhouse.

=== Gender transition ===
In 2014, Rose published an autobiography, Some Days Are Diamonds, in which she came out publicly as a trans woman and adopted the name Deena Kaye Rose. Her book was rejected by the Nashville library system in 2019.

== Awards ==
Five of Rose's songs have won BMI Awards:

- "Any Old Wind That Blows"
- "The Credit Card Song"
- "East Bound and Down"
- "Lord, Mr. Ford"
- "Some Days Are Diamonds (Some Days Are Stone)"

== Discography ==
All music billed to Dick Feller.

=== Albums ===
| Year | Album | Peak positions | Label |
| Year | Album | US Country | Label |
|---|---|---|---|
| 1973 | Dick Feller Wrote | 41 | United Artists |
| 1974 | No Word on Me | 30 | Asylum |
| 1975 | Some Days Are Diamonds | 44 | Asylum |
| 1982 | Audiograph Alive | — | Indigo |
| 2001 | Centaur of Attention | — | Cyberphonic |
"—" denotes releases that did not chart

=== Singles ===
| Year | Single | Peak positions | | | | | Album |
| Year | Single | US Country | US | US AC | CAN Country | CAN AC | Album |
|---|---|---|---|---|---|---|---|
| 1972 | "The Sum of Marcie's Blues" | — | — | — | — | — | Dick Feller Wrote |
| 1973 | "Daisy Hill" | — | — | — | — | — | Dick Feller Wrote |
| 1973 | "Biff, the Friendly Purple Bear" | 22 | 101 | 36 | 17 | 59 | Dick Feller Wrote |
| 1974 | "Makin' the Best of a Bad Situation" | 11 | 85 | 33 | 38 | — | No Word on Me |
| 1974 | "The Credit Card Song" | 10 | 105 | 40 | 38 | — | Dick Feller Wrote |
| 1974 | "Cry for Lori" | — | — | — | — | — | No Word on Me |
| 1975 | "Uncle Hiram and the Homemade Beer" | 49 | — | — | — | — | Some Days Are Diamonds |
| 1976 | "Some Days Are Diamonds (Some Days Are Stone)" | — | — | — | — | — | Some Days Are Diamonds |
| 1982 | "Instant Glue" | — | — | — | — | — | Audiograph Alive |
"—" denotes releases that did not chart
