= Rocky Mountain High =

1972 single by John Denver

Single by John Denver

from the album Rocky Mountain High
- B-side: "Spring"
- Released: October 30, 1972
- Recorded: August 1972
- Genre: Country folk, country rock
- Length: 4:43
- Label: RCA Victor
- Songwriters: John Denver, Mike Taylor
- Producer: Milt Okun

John Denver singles chronology
"Please, Daddy" (1973)	"Rocky Mountain High" (1972)	"Sunshine on My Shoulders" (1973)

Audio video
- "Rocky Mountain High" on YouTube

- State song of Colorado
- Adopted: March 12, 2007; 19 years ago
- Preceded by: "Where the Columbines Grow" (equal status as of 2007, first adopted 1915)

"Rocky Mountain High" is a song written by John Denver and Mike Taylor and is one of the two official state songs of the U.S state of Colorado. Recorded by Denver in 1972, it is the title track of the 1972 album Rocky Mountain High, and rose to No. 9 on the US Hot 100 in 1973, where it ranked at number 29 for 1973's Hot 100 Year-End charts. Denver told concert audiences in the mid-1970s that the song took him an unusually long nine months to write. On April 10, 2017, the record was certified Gold by the Recording Industry Association of America for sales exceeding 500,000 digital downloads.

== Background and writing ==
"Rocky Mountain High" was primarily inspired by John Denver's move to Aspen, Colorado, three years before its writing, and by his love for the state. The seventh stanza makes reference to the destruction of the mountains' beauty by commercial tourism. The song was considered a major piece of 1970s pop culture and became a well-associated piece of Colorado history.

The song briefly became controversial that year when the U.S. Federal Communications Commission was permitted by a legal ruling to censor music deemed to promote drug abuse. Numerous radio stations cautiously banned it until Denver publicly explained that the phrase "everybody's high" was his innocent description of the sense of peace he found in the Rockies. In 1985, Denver testified before Congress in the Parents Music Resource Center hearings about his experience:

This was obviously done by people who had never seen or been to the Rocky Mountains, and also had never experienced the elation, celebration of life or the joy in living that one feels when he observes something as wondrous as the Perseid meteor shower on a moonless, cloudless night, when there are so many stars that you have a shadow from the starlight, and you are out camping with your friends, your best friends, and introducing them to one of nature's most spectacular light shows for the first time.

In late 2007, the John Denver Sanctuary in Aspen drew some controversy after the last lines of the song, which included the controversial lyric, were removed from the "Rocky Mountain High" stone.

Cash Box said that the song "sparkles with sincerity and beautiful lyrical images."

== In popular culture ==
After years as an unofficial anthem for Colorado, on March 12, 2007, the Colorado General Assembly made "Rocky Mountain High" one of two official state songs, sharing the honor with "Where the Columbines Grow".

The song was also heard in Final Destination as a premonition for the accident in the opening scene and later before another character is about to die.

American singer-songwriter Lana Del Rey referenced "Rocky Mountain High" in her 2023 single "The Grants".

== Chart performance ==
Chart (1972–1973)	Peak position
Australia (Kent Music Report)	39
Canada Top Singles (RPM)	8
Canada Adult Contemporary (RPM)	2
US Billboard Hot 100	9
US Adult Contemporary (Billboard)	3
US Cash Box Top 100	7

== Certifications ==
Region	Certification	Certified units/sales
New Zealand (RMNZ)	Gold	15,000^{‡}
^{‡} Sales+streaming figures based on certification alone.

== See also ==
- Bibliography of Colorado
- Geography of Colorado
- History of Colorado
- Index of Colorado-related articles
- List of Colorado-related lists
- Outline of Colorado
