= Some Days Are Diamonds (Some Days Are Stone) =

Single by John Denver

from the album Some Days Are Diamonds
- B-side: "Country Love"
- Released: May 1981
- Studio: Sound Emporium (Nashville, Tennessee)
- Genre: Country
- Length: 4:00
- Label: RCA Records
- Songwriter: Deena Rose
- Producer: Larry Butler

John Denver singles chronology
| "Dancing with the Mountains" (1980) | "Some Days Are Diamonds (Some Days Are Stone)" (1981) | "The Cowboy and the Lady" (1981) |

"Some Days Are Diamonds (Some Days Are Stone)" is a song written by Deena Kaye Rose (Note: Credited as Dick Feller; the song was written and released before Rose came out as transgender.) and quite different from the humorous and novelty songs for which she is best known. Rose recorded the song in 1976, but the original version failed to chart.

The song was covered by multiple artist including Bobby Bare and John Denver. Denver's version, released on the 1981 album Some Days Are Diamonds, was the album's first single. Denver's version peaked at number 10 on the Billboard Hot Country Singles chart and number 36 on the Billboard Hot 100. It also reached number one on the RPM Country Tracks chart in Canada. Julie Andrews included a cover version in her 1982's album, Love Me Tender, the song peaked at number 10 on the Canadian RPM Adult Contemporary chart.

== Content ==
In a 2016 interview with Outtake Media, writer Deena Kaye Rose stated that she wrote the song about her struggles with gender identity prior to her own coming out as a transgender woman. She stated that she felt that, being in the music industry, she often had to hide her desired identity from the music community and respectively used the images of diamonds and stone to reflect her feminine and masculine sides.

== Charts ==
| Chart (1981) | Peak position |
|---|---|
| U.S. Billboard Hot 100 | 36 |
| U.S. Billboard Hot Country Singles | 10 |
| U.S. Billboard Adult Contemporary | 12 |
| Canadian RPM Country Tracks | 1 |
| Canadian RPM Adult Contemporary | 1 |
