= List of acronyms: M =

This list contains acronyms, initialisms, and pseudo-blends that begin with the letter M.

For the purposes of this list:

- acronym = an abbreviation pronounced as if it were a word, e.g., SARS = severe acute respiratory syndrome, pronounced to rhyme with cars
- initialism = an abbreviation pronounced wholly or partly using the names of its constituent letters, e.g., CD = compact disc, pronounced cee dee
- pseudo-blend = an abbreviation whose extra or omitted letters mean that it cannot stand as a true acronym, initialism, or portmanteau (a word formed by combining two or more words).

(a) = acronym, e.g.: SARS – (a) severe acute respiratory syndrome
(i) = initialism, e.g.: CD – (i) compact disc
(p) = pseudo-blend, e.g.: UNIFEM – (p) United Nations Development Fund for Women
(s) = symbol (none of the above, representing and pronounced as something else; for example: MHz – megahertz)

Some terms are spoken as either acronym or initialism, e.g., VoIP, pronounced both as voyp and V-O-I-P.

(Main list of acronyms)

- m – (s) Metre – Milli
- M – (s) Mega- – One thousand (in Roman numerals)

== MA ==
- mA – (s) Milliampere
- Ma – (s) Megaannum
- MA
  - (s) Madagascar (FIPS 10-4 country code)
  - (i) Marijuana Anonymous
  - (i) Master of Arts
  - Massachusetts (postal symbol)
  - Megaampere
  - Morocco (ISO 3166 digram)
- MAA – (i) Mathematical Association of America
- MAAC – (a) Metro Atlantic Athletic Conference
- MAC
  - (s) Macau (ISO 3166 trigram)
  - (a) U.S. Military Airlift Command (1966–1992)
  - Mid-American Conference
- MACA – (i) Military aid to the civil authorities
- MACE – (a) Multi-agent computing environment
- MACHO – (p) Massive compact halo object
- MAD
  - (a) Magnetic anomaly detector
  - (s) Moroccan dirham (ISO 4217 currency code)
  - (a) Mutual assured destruction
- MADD
  - (a) Mothers Against Drunk Driving
  - Myoadenylate deaminase deficiency
  - (p) Multiply–add
- MAF – (i) Maintenance action form
- MAFF - (a) Ministry of Agriculture, Forestry and Fisheries (various countries)
- MAGIC – (a) Major Atmospheric Gamma-ray Imaging Cherenkov (telescope)
- MAGNETAR – (p) Metaprogrammable AGent NETwork ARchitecture
- MAGTF – (i) Marine Air-Ground Task Force
- mah – (s) Marshallese language (ISO 639-2 code)
- Mahasz – (p) Magyar Hanglemezkiadók Szövetsége (Hungarian, "Association of Hungarian Record Companies")
- mal – (s) Malayalam language (ISO 639-2 code)
- MALD – (a) Miniature Air-Launched Decoy
- MANPADS – (p) MAN-portable air defence system
- MANPRINT – (p) Mapower and personnel integration
- MAO
  - (i/a) Molėtų astronomijos observatorija (Molėtai Astronomical Observatory)
  - (p) Monoamine oxidase
- MAOI – (p) Monoamine oxidase inhibitor
- MAP – (a) Management action plan (corporate phrase)
- MAPP - (a) Medical assistance premium program
- MAPS – (a) Monitoring Avian Productivity and Survivorship
- MAQS – (a) Museum of the American Quilter's Society ("max")
- mar – (s) Marathi language (ISO 639-2 code)
- MAR – (s) Morocco (ISO 3166 trigram)
- MarBEF – (p) Marine biodiversity and ecosystem functioning
- MARC
  - (a) Machine readable cataloging (or machine readable code)
  - Mailing list archive
  - Maryland Area Regional Commuter train service
  - Massachusetts Animal Rights Coalition
  - Mid-America Regional Council
- MARCENT – (p) United States Marine Forces Central Command
- MARFORCC – (p) Marine Force Component Commander
- MARINE (acronym) Muscles Are Required, Intelligence Not Evaluated- Used by Enlisted and Officer Ranks in the USMC
- MARINES (acronym) My A** Rides In Navy Equipment, Sir! - Banter with Navy Personnel by Marines
- MARRS – (a) Martyn Young, Alex Ayuli, Rudy Tambala, Russell Smith, and Steve Young (British electronic music act)
- MAS – (i) NATO Military Agency for Standardization
- MASAS – (a) Monte Agliale Supernovae and Asteroid Survey
- Maser – (a) Microwave Amplification by Stimulated Emission of Radiation
- MASH – (a) Mobile Army Surgical Hospital
- MASINT – (p) Measurement And Signature Intelligence
- MATREX – (p) Modeling Architecture for Technology, Research & EXperimentation
- MATS – (a) U.S. Military Air Transport Service (1948–1966)
- MAVS – (a/i) Mobile Artillery Vehicle System
- MAW – (s) Malawi (IOC trigram, but not FIFA or ISO 3166)
- MAX – (i) Meta-reasoning Architecture for "X"

== MB ==
- MB
  - (s) Manitoba (postal symbol)
  - Martinique (FIPS 10-4 territory code)
  - Medal of Bravery (Canada)
- MBA
  - (i) Main Battle Area
  - Main Belt Asteroid
  - Master of Business Administration
- MBI – (i) Moody Bible Institute
- MBBL – (i) (U.S. Armor Center) Mounted Battlespace Battle Laboratory
- MBCC – (i) Migratory Bird Conservation Commission (U.S.)
- MBCS – (i) Multi-Byte Character Set
- MBE
  - (p) Member of the Order of the British Empire
  - (i) Multistate Bar Examination (U.S.)
- MBIDST – (i) Member of the British Institute of Dental and Surgical Technologists
- MBM – (i) Meat and Bone Meal
- MBR - (i) Master boot record
- MbS – (i) Mohammad bin Salman (current crown prince of Saudi Arabia)
- MBSE – (i) Model-based systems engineering
- mbsf – metres below sea floor, a depth convention used in paleontology and oceanography
- MBT – (i) Main Battle Tank
- MBTA – (i) Massachusetts Bay Transportation Authority – Migratory Bird Treaty Act (U.S.)
- MBTI – (i) Myers-Briggs Type Indicator

== MC ==
- mC – (s) Millicoulomb
- MC
  - (s) Macau (FIPS 10-4 territory code)
  - (i) Master of ceremonies
  - (s) Megacoulomb
  - (i) Military Cross (bravery award)
  - (s) Monaco (ISO 3166 digram)
  - (i) Mortar carrier
  - (s) Eleven hundred (in Roman numerals)
- MCA
  - (i) Master of Computer Applications
  - Micro Channel Architecture
  - Multichannel analyzer
  - Music Corporation of America, the original name of the now-defunct MCA Inc.
  - (i) Malaysian Chinese Association
- MCC
  - (i) Marylebone Cricket Club
  - Mission control center
  - Motor control center
  - Movement control centre
- MCD
  - (i) Minimal Cerebral Dysfunction
  - Minor civil division (U.S. Census term)
- MCDL – (i) Model Composition Definition Language
- MCFT – (i) Modified compression field theory
- MCG – (i) Melbourne Cricket Ground
- MC&G – (i) Mapping, charting, and geodesy
- MCI – (i) Microwave Communications, Inc.
- MCIS – (i) Mellon Collie and the Infinite Sadness
- MCM – (i) Mine Counter-Measures
- MCMV – (i) Mine Counter-Measure Vessel
- MCNC
  - (i) Microelectronics Center of North Carolina
  - (i) Mixing Condensation Nucleus Counter
- MCO
  - (i) Major Combat Operation
  - (s) Monaco (ISO 3166 trigram)
  - (s) Orlando International Airport (IATA code)
  - (i) Movement Control Officer
- MCP
  - (i) Maintenance Collection Point
  - Male Chauvinist Pig
- MCR – (i) My Chemical Romance
- MCSF – (i) Marine Corps Security Forces
- MCT – (i) Movement Control Team
- MCTIS – (i) Mounted Co-operative Target Identification System
- MCU
  - (i) Marine Corps University
  - Marvel Cinematic Universe
  - Medium close-up (camera direction in British TV scripts)
  - (p) Microcontroller unit
  - (i) Milk clotting units
  - Ming Chuan University
  - Minimum coded unit (digital imaging)
  - Multipoint control unit
  - Municipal Credit Union (New York)
- MCWS – (i) Men's College World Series, the final phase of the NCAA Division I baseball tournament in the US

== MD ==
- Md – (s) Mendelevium
- MD
  - (s) Fifteen Hundred (in Roman numerals)
  - Maryland (postal symbol)
  - (i) Medicinae Doctor (Doctor of Medicine/Medical Doctor)
  - Mentioned in Dispatches (military)
  - (s) Moldova (FIPS 10-4 country code; ISO 3166 digram)
- MDA
  - (i) Main Defensive Action/Area
  - (s) Moldova (ISO 3166 trigram)
  - (i) Muscular Dystrophy Association
- MDF
  - (i) Main distribution frame
  - Medium-density fiberboard
- MDG
  - (s) Madagascar (ISO 3166 trigram)
  - (i) UN Millennium Development Goal
- MDL – (s) Moldovan leu (ISO 4217 currency code)
- MDM
  - (i) Michigan Dartmouth MIT telescope consortium
  - Master data management
- MDMA – (i) MethyleneDioxy-MethylAmphetamine (also known as "Ecstasy")
- MDNA – (p) Madonna's 12th studio album title (2012)
- MDO – (i) Membership Driven Organisation
- MDP – (i) Markov Decision Process
- MDT – (i) Mountain Daylight Time (UTC−6 hours)
- MDS
- MDV – (s) Maldives (ISO 3166 trigram)
- MDW
  - (s) Chicago Midway International Airport in Chicago (IATA airport code)
  - (i) Military District of Washington
  - (s) Minnesota, Dakota and Western Railway (AAR reporting mark)
  - (i) Mother’s Day Weekend

== ME ==
- Me – (s) Messerschmitt
- ME
  - (s) Maine (postal symbol)
  - (i) Mechanical engineer[ing]
  - Medical examiner
  - Middle East
  - (s) Middle East Airlines (IATA code)
  - (i) Memory Effect – Myalgic Encephalomyelitis
- MEA
  - (i) Maine Educational Assessment
  - Middle East Airlines
  - Millennium Ecosystem Assessment
  - Minimum en route altitude
  - Mono-ethanol Amine
  - Multilateral Environmental Agreement
- MEAC – (a) Mid-Eastern Athletic Conference (ME-ac)
- MEC
  - (s) Maine Central Railroad
  - Manta, Ecuador (IATA location identifier)
  - (i) Model European Council
  - Mountain East Conference
  - Mountain Equipment Co-op
- MECC – (a) Minnesota Educational Computing Consortium (later Corporation, dissolved 1999)
- MECCA – (a) Milwaukee Exposition Convention Center and Arena, a former name for the sports venue now known as UW–Milwaukee Panther Arena
- MECO – (a) Main engine cutoff (NASA code for point in Space Shuttle ascent when three main engines are shut down prior to External Tank (ET) separation)
- MEDEVAC – (p) Medical evacuation
- MEDLI
  - (a) Mars Science Laboratory Entry, Descent, and Landing Instrumentation
  - (a) Medical & Scientific Libraries of Long Island
  - (a) Model for Effluent Disposal using Land Irrigation
- MEDS – (a) Mission Essential Data Set
- MEF
  - (i) U.S. Marine Expeditionary Force
  - Minimum essential facility
  - Mission essential force
- MEG – (i) MagnetoEncephaloGraphy
- MEI – (i) Matsushita Electric Industrial Co., Ltd.
- MEK
  - (i) Magyar Elektronikus Konyvtar
  - Message encryption key
  - (a) methyl ethyl ketone
  - (p) Mujahideen al-Khalq
- MEL
  - (i) Maya Embedded Language
  - Michigan Electronic Library
- MELT – (a) Metallic Line/Loop Test (ing)
- MEM
  - (i) Message Exchange Mechanism
  - (p) Microelectromechanical
- MEMS – (p) Microelectromechanical System
- MENA – (i/a) Middle East and North Africa ("MEE-na" or "MEH-na")
- MEO
  - (a) Medium Earth orbit
  - Most efficient organization
- MEP
  - (i) Mechanical Electrical Plumbing
  - Member of the European Parliament
  - Missions étrangères de Paris (French for "Paris Foreign Missions")
  - Model European Parliament
- MER – (i) Mars Exploration Rover
- MERL – (i) Mitsubishi Electric Research Laboratories
- MES
  - (i) Marconi Electronic Systems
  - Medium Edison screw
- MESSENGER – (p) MErcury Surface, Space ENvironment, GEochemistry and Ranging
- MET
  - (p) Meteorological
  - (a) Middle European Time
- METAR – (p) [Meteorological] Aviation Routine weather report
- METL – (i/a) Mission Essential Task List ("mettle")
- METOC – (p) Meteorological and Oceanographic
- METT-T – (a/i) Mission, Enemy, Terrain, Troops, and Time available (mnemonic)
- METT-TC – (a/i) Mission, Enemy, Terrain [and weather], Troops [and support], Time [available] and Civilian considerations (mnemonic)
- MEU
  - (i) U.S. Marine Expeditionary Unit
  - Maximum Expected Utility
- MeV – (s) Megaelectronvolt
- MEV
  - (i) Medical Evacuation Vehicle
  - Musica Elettronica Viva
- MEX – (s) Mexico (ISO 3166 trigram)
- MEZ – (i) Missile Engagement Zone
- MES – (a) Manufacturing Execution Systems

== MF ==
- mF – (s) Millifarad
- MF
  - (s) Mayotte (FIPS 10-4 territory code)
  - Megafarad
  - (a) Motherfucker (profanity)
- MFG - (s) Manufacturing
- MFSB – (i) Mother, Father, Sister, Brother (1970s Philadelphia studio musicians collective)
- MFT
  - (i) Managed file transfer
  - Master File Table
  - Mean field theory
  - Media Foundation Transform
  - Micro Four Thirds (camera design standard)

== MG ==
- mg – (s) Malagasy language (ISO 639-1 code) – Milligram
- Mg – (s) Magnesium – Megagram
- MG – (i) Machine Gun – (s) Madagascar (ISO 3166 digram) – (s) Major General – (s) Mongolia (FIPS 10-4 country code) – (i) Morris Garage
- MGA – (s) Malagasy ariary (ISO 4217 currency code)
- MGB – (i) Medium Girder Bridge, Motor Gun Boat
- MGM – (i) Metro Goldwyn Mayer – (s) Montgomery, Alabama (Airport Code)
- MGPAM – My Gym Partner's a Monkey
- MGS – (i) Mobile Gun System

== MH ==
- mh – (s) Marshallese language (ISO 639-1 code)
- mH – (s) Millihenry
- MH
  - (s) Marshall Islands (postal symbol; ISO 3166 digram)
  - Megahenry
  - Montserrat (FIPS 10-4 territory code)
  - (s) Malaysia Airlines (IATA code)
- MHC – (i) Major histocompatibility complex
- MHEV – Micro-Hybrid Electric Vehicle
- MHHW – (i) Mean Higher High Water (nautical charts)
- MHL – (s) Marshall Islands (ISO 3166 trigram)
- MHLW – (i) Mean Higher Low Water (nautical charts)
- MHRA – (i) (UK) Medicines and Healthcare products Regulatory Agency
- MHW – (i) Mean High Water (nautical charts)
- MHWN – (i) Mean High Water Neaps (nautical charts)
- MHWS – (i) Mean High Water Springs (nautical charts)
- MHz – (s) Megahertz

== MI ==
- mi – (s) Māori language (ISO 639-1 code)
- Mi – (s) Mebi
- MI
  - (s) Malawi (FIPS 10-4 country code)
  - Michigan (postal symbol)
  - Midway Islands (ISO 3166 digram; obsolete 1986)
  - (i) Military Intelligence
- MIA
  - (i) Missing In Action
  - Miami International Airport (IATA code)
- MIAA
  - (i) Maryland Interscholastic Athletic Association
  - Massachusetts Interscholastic Athletic Association
  - Michigan Intercollegiate Athletic Association
  - Mid-America Intercollegiate Athletics Association
- MIB
  - (i) Men In Black
  - Mint In Box (Internet auction/trading listings)
- MIC
  - (i) Military Industrial Complex
  - (i) Malaysian Indian Congress
- MICE – (a) Meetings, Incentives, Conferences, Exhibitions tourism
- MICLIC – (p) Mine Clearing Line Charge
- MICOM – (p) Missile Command
- MICV – (i) Mechanised Infantry Combat Vehicle
- MID – (s) Midway Islands (ISO 3166 trigram; obsolete 1986)
- MIDI – (a) Musical Instrument Digital Interface
- MIDAS – (a) Man-machine Integration Design and Analysis System
- MIDS – (i) Multi-Function Information Distribution System
- MIFC – (a) Military Industrial Financial Complex
- MIFG – (s) Shallow Fog (METAR Code)
- MIFPC – (a) Military Industrial Financial Pharmaceutical Complex
- MIKE – (a) Monitoring of Illegal Killing of Elephants
- MIL – (i) Man-In-the-Loop
- MIL-AASPEM – (i) Man-In-the-Loop AASPEM
- MILAN – (p) Missile d´infanterie léger antichar (French, "Anti-Tank Light Infantry Missile")
- MiLB – (p) Minor League Baseball
- MILC – (a) Mirrorless interchangeable-lens camera
- MILES – (a) Multiple Integrated Laser Engagement System (live combat simulation)
- MILF
  - (i) Moro Islamic Liberation Front
  - (a) Mother I'd Like to Fuck
- MILSATCOM – (p) Military Satellite Communications
- MILSET – (a) Mouvement International pour le Loisir Scientifique Et Technique (French, "International Movement for Leisure Activities in Science and Technology")
- MILSTRIP – (p) Military Standard Requisitioning and Issue Procedure DLMSO MILSTRIP Manual
- Mimaropa – (p) Mindoro, Marinduque, Romblon, Palawan (a region in the Philippines)
- MIMOSA – (a) MIcroMeasurements Of Satellite Acceleration
- MIMPT – (i) Member of the Institute of Maxillofacial Prosthetists and Technologists
- MIP
  - (a) Multilateral Interoperability Programme
  - Multiple Identity Poster
- MIPC – (a) Military Industrial Pharmaceutical Complex
- MIRA – (a) MILAN Infra-Red Acquisition (thermal sight)
- MIRV – (a) Multiple Independent Reentry Vehicle
- MIS
  - (a) Management Information Systems
  - Museum Information System
- MISREP – (p) Mission Report
- MISSI – (a) Multilevel Information System Security Initiative
- MIT
  - (i) Massachusetts Institute of Technology
  - methylisothiazoline
  - Milli Istihbarad Teskilati (Intelligence service of Turkey)
- MITL – (i) Man-In-The-Loop
- MITS – see entry

== MJ ==
- mJ – (s) Millijoule
- MJ
  - (s) Megajoule
  - (i) Michael Jordan
  - (i) Michael Jackson
  - (i) Mary Jane Watson (Spider-Man character)
- MJD – (i) Modified Julian Day
- MJF – (i) Maxwell Jacob Friedman, American professional wrestler (who currently performs as "MJF")
- MJP – (i) Military Judgement Panel

== MK ==
- mk – (s) Macedonian language (ISO 639-1 code)
- mK – (s) Millikelvin
- Mk - (s) Mark (US weapon designation), as in Mk 18 MOD 0 CQBR
- MK
  - (s) Air Mauritius (IATA code)
  - Macedonia (ISO 3166 digram; FIPS 10-4 country code)
  - (i) Mandalskameratene (Norwegian football club)
  - (s) Megakelvin
  - (i) Milton Keynes
  - Missionary Kids
  - Mortal Kombat (1992 video game)
  - Mortal Kombat (2011 video game)
- mkd – (s) Macedonian language (ISO 639-2 code)
- MKD
  - (s) Macedonian denar (ISO 4217 currency code)
  - North Macedonia (ISO 3166 trigram)
- MKG – (i) Michael Kidd-Gilchrist (American basketball player)
- MKO – (i) Mojahedin-e-Khalq Organization (Persian, "People's Mujahedin of Iran")
- MKS
  - (i) Metre–Kilogram–Second (system of units)
  - (p) MKS Inc. software company
- MKSA – (i) Metre–Kilogram–Second–Ampere (system of units)
- MKT
  - (i) Missouri-Kansas-Texas Railroad (1865–1989)
  - Mortal Kombat Trilogy
  - Short form of Marketing

== ML ==
- ml – (s) Malayalam language (ISO 639-1 code)
- mL – (s) Millilitre
- ML
  - (s) Mali (FIPS 10-4 country code; ISO 3166 digram)
  - (i) Maximum Likelihood
  - (s) Megalitre
- MLA
  - (i) Martial Law Administration of Bangladesh
  - Master of Landscape Architecture
  - Medical Library Association
  - Member of Legislative Assembly
  - Modern Language Association
  - Mutual legal assistance treaty
  - Myelosis Leucemica Acuta
- MLB
  - (i) Major League Baseball
  - (s) Melbourne Orlando International Airport (IATA code)
- MLC – (i) Member of the Legislative Council (in India)
- MLE – (i) Maximum likelihood estimation
- mlg – (s) Malagasy language (ISO 639-2 code)
- MLG
  - (i) Major League Gaming
  - (i) Main Landing Gear
- MLHW – (i) Mean Lower High Water (nautical charts)
- MLI – (s) Mali (ISO 3166 trigram)
- MLK – (i) Martin Luther King Jr.
- MLL – (i) Major League Lacrosse
- MLLW – (i) Mean Lower Low Water (nautical charts)
- MLP – My Little Pony
- MLR
  - (i) Medical Loss Ratio
- MLRS – (i) Multiple-Launch Rocket System
- MLS
  - (i) Major League Soccer
  - Multiple Listing Service
  - Multilevel security
- MLSE
  - (i) Maple Leaf Sports & Entertainment (owner of several Toronto-based sports teams)
  - Maximum likelihood sequence estimation
- MLSR – (i) Missing, Lost or Stolen Report
- mlt – (s) Maltese language (ISO 639-2 code)
- MLT – (s) Malta (ISO 3166 trigram)
- MLVW – (i) Medium Logistics Vehicle, Wheeled
- MLW
  - (i) Major League Wrestling (American professional wrestling promotion)
  - Mean Low Water (nautical charts)
- MLWN – (i) Mean Low Water Neaps (nautical charts)
- MLWS – (i) Mean Low Water Springs (nautical charts)

== MM ==
- mm – (s) Millimetre
- Mm – (s) Megametre
- MM – (i) Military Medal – (s) Myanmar (ISO 3166 digram) – Two Thousand (in Roman numerals)
- MMA – (i) Mixed martial arts – Moving Mechanical Assembly
- MMC – (p) Machinist's Mate, Chief (USN rating) – (i) Materiel Management Centre
- MMCM – (p) Machinist's Mate, Master Chief (USN rating) – (i) Magnetic Mine Counter Measure
- MMCS – (p) Machinist's Mate, Senior Chief (USN rating)
- MMEV – (i) Multi-Mission Effects Vehicle
- MMI – (i) Man-Machine Interface
- MMI – (i) McLean Meditation Institute
- MMIC – (i) Mindfulness & Meditation Instructor, Certified
- MMIC – (i) McLean Meditation Institute Certified
- MMI – (i) Magical MonkeyZ Inc.
- MMIO – (i) Memory-mapped I/O
- MMK – (s) Burmese kyat (ISO 4217 currency code)
- MMO – (i) Massively Multiplayer Online (computer game)
- MMOR – (i) Master of Management in Operations Research
- MMORPG – (i) Massively multiplayer online role-playing game
- MMPR – Mighty Morphin Power Rangers
- MMR – (i) Measles, Mumps and Rubella vaccine – (s) Myanmar (ISO 3166 trigram)
- MMS – (i) Multimission Modular Spacecraft
- MMU – (i) Manchester Metropolitan University – (i) Manned Manoeuvring Unit
- MMW – (p) Millimetre Wave (radar, from "mm Wave")

== MN ==
- mn – (s) Mongolian language (ISO 639-1 code)
- mN – (s) Millinewton
- Mn – (s) Manganese
- MN – (s) Meganewton – Minnesota (postal symbol) – Monaco (FIPS 10-4 country code) – Mongolia (ISO 3166 digram)
- MNB – (p) Multinational Brigade
- MNB C – (p) Multinational Brigade Centre (KFOR)
- MND – (i) Motor Neurone Disease – (p) Multinational Division
- MNE – (s) Montenegro (ISO 3166 trigram)
- MNG – (i) Multiple-image Network Graphics – (s) Mongolia (ISO 3166 trigram)
- MNMF – (i) Multi-National Maritime Force
- MNP – (s) Northern Mariana Islands (ISO 3166 trigram)
- MNS – (i) Mission Needs Statement
- MNT – (p) Molecular nanotechnology – (s) Mongolian tugrik (ISO 4217 currency code)

== MO ==
- mo – (s) Moldovan language (ISO 639-1 code)
- Mo – (s) Molybdenum
- MO – (s) Macau (ISO 3166 digram) – (i) Medical Officer – (s) Missouri (postal symbol) – (i) modus operandi (Latin, "mode of operation") – (s) Morocco (FIPS 10-4 country code) [mutual oral]
- MOA – Museum of Art (Brigham Young University)
- MOAB – (a) Massive Ordnance Air Blast (official) – Mother Of All Bombs (slang)
- MOB – (i) Man Over Board – Marching Owl Band – Movable Object Block
- MOC – (i) Macedonian Orthodox Church – Measure Of Capability – Mission Operations Centre – My Own Creation (Lego)
- MOCAS – (a) Mechanization Of Contract Administration Services
- MoD – (i) Ministry of Defence (United Kingdom) and various other countries
- MOD – (i) Magneto-optical disc – Masters of Deception – Minimum Object Distance – Multiple Organ Dysfunction
- MoDAF – (p) Ministry of Defence Architecture Framework ("moh-daff")
- modem – (p) Modulator-Demodulator
- ModSAF – (p) Modular Semi-Automated Forces (military simulation)
- Moe – (a) Marvel of entertainment
- MOE – (i) Measure Of Effectiveness
- MOF – (a/i) Ministry of Finance (Japan)
- MOFA – (a/i) Ministry of Foreign Affairs (Japan)
- MOH – (a/i) Medal of Honor – Music On Hold
- MOID – (i) Minimum Orbital Intersection Distance
- MOJWA – (i) Movement for Oneness and Jihad in West Africa
- mol – (s) Moldovan language (ISO 639-2 code) – mole (unit)
- MOLO – (a) Mobile Other Licensed Operator (UK)
- MoM – (a) Multiple of the median
- MOM – (a) Message-oriented middleware
- MOM – (a) Master's Degree in Oriental medicine
- MoMA – (a) Museum of Modern Art (NYC)
- mon – (s) Mongolian language (ISO 639-2 code)
- MOND – (p) Modified Newtonian Dynamics
- MOO – (i) Measure Of Outcome
- MOOTW – (p) Military Operations Other Than War ("moot-double-you")
- MOP – (s) Macau pataca (ISO 4217 currency code) – (i) Measure Of Performance
- MOPE – (a) Ministry of Population and Environment (Nepal) – Most Oppressed People Ever (politics)
- MOPP – (i/a) Mission-Oriented Protective Posture
- MORP – (a) Meteorite Observation and Recovery Project
- MORS – (i) Military Operations Research Society
- MOS – (i) Military Occupational Specialty – (a) Mit Out Sound / Motor Only Sync – (i) Mobile Object System – Model Output Statistics – Multiplayer Online Services - (a) Mean Opinion Score
- MOS-CQ - (a) Mean Opinion Score - Conversational Quality (ITU-T P.800.1)
- MOS-LQ - (a) Mean Opinion Score - Listening Quality (ITU-T P.800.1)
- MOSFET – (a) Metal-Oxide-Semiconductor Field-Effect Transistor
- MOSS – (p) MObile Submarine Simulator – (a) Moving Object Support System
- MOT – (i) Ministry of Transport (UK)
- MOTA – (i) Member of the Orthodontic Technicians Association
- MOTESS – (a) Moving Object and Transient Event Search System
- MOTO – (a) Mail Order / Telephone Order – Master of the obvious
- MOU – (i) Memorandum Of Understanding
- MOUT – (i) Military Operations in Urban[ized] Terrain
- MOVES – (a) Modeling, Virtual Environments, and Simulation Institute
- MOW – (i) Maintenance of way (also MW)
- MOZ – (s) Mozambique (ISO 3166 trigram)

== MP ==
- MP – (i) Magic points – (s) Mauritius (FIPS 10-4 country code) – (i) Member of Parliament – Military Police – Missouri Pacific – (s) Northern Mariana Islands (postal symbol; ISO 3166 digram)
- mPa – (s) Millipascal
- MPa – (s) Megapascal
- MPA - Master of Public Administration
- MPA – (i) Maritime Patrol Aircraft
- MPAA – (i) Motion Picture Association of America
- MPC – (i) Minor Planet Center – Minor Planet Circular
- MPC – (i) Military Payment Certificate
- MPEC – (i) Minor Planet Electronic Circular
- MPEG – (a) Motion Pictures (Coding) Experts Group
- MPEV – (i) Multi-Purpose Engineering Vehicle
- MPF – (i) Maritime Prepositioning Force
- MPFC – (i) Medial PreFrontal Cortex
- MPG - (i) Miles Per Gallon
- MPMC – (i) Medial PreMotor Cortex
- MPSI – (i) Member of the Pharmaceutical Society of Ireland
- MPSoC – (i) MultiProcessor System-on-Chip
- MPSRON – (p) Maritime Propositioning Ship Squadron

== MQ ==
- MQ
  - (s) Martinique (ISO 3166 digram) – Midway Islands (FIPS 10-4 territory code)
  - (s) Multi-mission Unmanned Aerial Vehicle (US tri-service aircraft designator)

== MR ==
- mr – (s) Marathi language (ISO 639-1 code)
- MR – (s) Mauritania (FIPS 10-4 country code; ISO 3166 digram)
  - (i) Model Railroader Magazine
- MR-ATGW – (i) Medium-Range Anti-Tank Guided Weapon
- MRAV – (i) Multi-Role Armoured Vehicle
- MRBM – (i) Medium Range Ballistic Missile
- MRC – (i) Maintenance Requirements Card
- MRD – (i) Motorized Rifle Division
- MRE – (i) Meal Ready to Eat (U.S. military rations)
- MRGO – (i) Mississippi River–Gulf Outlet Canal (also referred to as MR-GO or "Mr. Go")
- MRGW – (i) Medium-range guided weapon
- mri – (s) Māori language (ISO 639-2 code)
- MRI – (i) Magnetic resonance imaging
- MRL – (i) Multiple rocket launcher
  - (i) Montana Rail Link
- MRO
  - (i) Maintenance, repair and operations
  - Mars Reconnaissance Orbiter
  - (s) Mauritanian ouguiya (ISO 4217 currency code)
- MRPharmS – (i) Member of the Royal Pharmaceutical Society (Great Britain)
- MRR – My Restaurant Rules
- MRS – (i) Magnetic Resonance Spectroscopy
- MRSA – (i/a) Methicillin-resistant Staphylococcus aureus (sometimes pronounced "MER-sa")
- MRT
  - (i) Mass Rapid Transit — used as either an official or unofficial name for metro systems in Singapore, Kaohsiung, Bangkok, Taipei, Chennai, and Delhi
  - (s) Mauritania (ISO 3166 trigram)
- MRTFB – (i) U.S. Major Range and Test Facility Base

== MS ==
- ms
  - (s) Malay language (ISO 639-1 code)
  - Millisecond
- mS – (s) Millisiemens
- Ms – (s) Megasecond
- MS
  - (i) mano sinistra (Latin, "left hand")
  - (p) manuscript
  - (i) Master of Science
  - (s) Megasiemens
  - (p) Microsoft (sometimes M$)
  - (s) Mississippi (postal symbol)
  - Montserrat (ISO 3166 digram)
  - (i) Multiple Sclerosis
- M&S
  - (i) Modelling & Simulation
  - Marks & Spencer
- MSA – (s) Malay language (ISO 639-2 code)
- MSB
  - (i) Main Support Battalion
  - Most Significant Bit (or Byte)
- MSD – (i) Minimum Safe Distance
- MSDB – (i) Multi Source Data Base
- MSDE
  - (i) Maryland State Department of Education
  - (p) Microsoft Data[base] Engine
  - Microsoft SQL Server 2000 Desktop Engine
  - (i) Military Scenario Development Environment
  - Mission Simulation Dynamic Engine
- MSDL – (i) Military Scenario Definition Language
- MSE – (i) Multiple Subscriber Element
- MSFS - (i) Microsoft Flight Simulator (flight simulator series)
- MSEC – (p) Message Security Encryption Code ("emm-sec")
- MSG
  - (i) MonoSodium Glutamate
  - Madison Square Garden (either the 1879, 1890, 1925, or current versions of the venue)
- MSH
  - (i) Medium Support Helicopter
  - Mount St. Helens
- MSI
  - (i) Micro-Star International
  - (p) Multispectral imagery
- MSIE
  - (i) Microsoft Internet Explorer
  - Master of Science in Industrial Engineering
- MSL
  - (i) Mars Science Laboratory
  - Mean Sea Level
  - (p) Missile
- MSLP – (i) Mean Sea Level Pressure
- MSM
  - (p) Mainstream media
  - (i) Men who have sex with men
  - Mount St Mary's School
- MSN
  - (i) Microsoft Network
  - Master of Science in Nursing
- MSNBC – (i) Microsoft National Broadcasting Company Cable news channel (see also msnbc.com)
- MSO – (i) Multiple System Operator
- MSP
  - Member of the Scottish Parliament
  - (i) Minneapolis–Saint Paul - Twin cities in Minnesota
  - (s) Minneapolis–Saint Paul International Airport (IATA code)
- MSPA
  - (p) Migrant and Seasonal worker Protection Act
  - (a) MS Paint Adventures
- MSPB – (i) Merit Systems Protection Board
- MSR
  - (i) Main Supply Route
  - Module Service Record
  - (s) Montserrat (ISO 3166 trigram)
  - (i) Motor Schlepp Regulung
  - Mountain Safety Research (outdoor supplies manufacturer)
- MSSA
  - Member of the Order of the Star of South Africa
  - (i) Methicillin-susceptible Staphylococcus aureus
  - (i) Military Selective Service Act
  - (i) Military-style semi-automatic
  - (i) Mind Sports South Africa
  - (i) Montreal Student Space Associations
  - MSSA Chemical Company, formerly known as Métaux Spéciaux.
- MST
  - (i) Madison Symmetric Torus
  - Mountain Standard Time (UTC−7 hours)
  - Maastricht Aachen Airport (IATA code)
- MST3K or MST3k – (i) Mystery Science Theater 3000
- MSU
  - (i) Michigan State University
  - Montana State University
  - Mountain State University
  - Lomonosov Moscow State University (Russia, a.k.a. MGU)

== MT ==
- mt – (s) Maltese language (ISO 639-1 code)
- mT – (s) Millitesla
- Mt – (s) Meitnerium
- MT
  - (s) Malta (FIPS 10-4 country code; ISO 3166 digram)
  - Megatesla
  - Montana (postal symbol)
  - (i) Motor Transport (military)
- MTA
  - (i) Metropolitan Transportation Authority (Boston) (now Massachusetts Bay Transportation Authority)
  - Metropolitan Transportation Authority
- MTBF – (i) Mean time between failures
- MtF – (i) Male-to-female transsexual
- MTF
  - (i) Magnetized target fusion
  - Medical Treatment Facility
  - Message Text Format
  - Modulation transfer function (optics)
- MTG – (i) Magic: The Gathering
- MTL
  - (s) Maltese lira (ISO 4217 currency code)
  - (i) Mean Tide Level (nautical charts)* MTM – (i) Methods-Time Measurement
- MTOE – (p) Modified Table of Organization and Equipment ("emm-toe")
- MTP
  - (i) Maritime Tactical Publication
  - Materiel Transfer Plan
  - Mission Training Plan
- MTQ – (s) Martinique (ISO 3166 trigram)
- MTR
  - (i) Main and Tail Rotor (helicopter type)
  - Mass Transit Railway (Hong Kong metro system)
  - Military-Technological Revolution
- MTS
  - (i) Maintenance Training System
  - Manitoba Telephone System and Manitoba Telecom Services, former names of Bell MTS
  - Michigan Terminal/Timesharing System
  - Movement Tracking System
  - Multichannel television sound
  - Multi-Technical Services
- MTT – (p) Methylthiazol tetrazolium (assay)
- MTU
  - (i) Tankovei Mostoukladchik (Russian Танковый Мостоукладчик, "Tank Bridge-Layer") †
  - (i) Motoren- und Turbinen-Union (German engine manufacturer, now split into MTU Friedrichshafen and MTU Aero Engines)
- MTV
  - (i) MainosTeleVisio (Finnish commercial TV company)
  - Music TeleVision
- MTVL – (i) Mobile Tracked Vehicle, Light
- MTWS – (i) MAGTF Tactical Warfare System

== MU ==
- MU
  - (s) Mauritius (ISO 3166 digram)
  - (s) Oman (FIPS 10-4 country code; from Muscat)
  - Manchester United (British football club)
- MUA
  - (i) Meritorious Unit Award
  - Military Utility Assessment
  - (i) Make-up Artist
- MUR – (s) Mauritius rupee (ISO 4217 currency code)
- MUS – (s) Mauritius (ISO 3166 trigram)

== MV ==
- mV – (s) Millivolt
- MV – (s) Maldives (FIPS 10-4 country code; ISO 3166 digram) – Megavolt – (i) Motor Vehicle – Motor Vessel
- MVC – (i) Missouri Valley Conference
- MVFC – (i) Missouri Valley Football Conference
- MVNO – (i) Mobile virtual network operator
- MVP – (i) Most Valuable Player
- MVR – (s) Maldivian rufiyaa (ISO 4217 currency code)

== MW ==
- mW – (s) Milliwatt
- MW
  - (i) Maintenance of way (also MOW)
  - (s) Malawi (ISO 3166 digram)
  - (i) Medium Wave (radio)
  - (s) Megawatt
  - (i) Mountain West (Conference) (formal initialism since July 2011)
- MWC
  - (i) Maritime Warfare Centre (various nations)
  - Mountain West Conference (still used informally, although the league has adopted "MW")
- MWESH – (p) Machismo Wizards Extended SHelter (operating system)
- MWI – (s) Malawi (ISO 3166 trigram)
- MWK – (s) Malawian kwacha (ISO 4217 currency code)
- MWOA – (i) Mount Wilson Observatory Association
- MWR – (i) Morale, Welfare, and Recreation
- MWTB - (a) Mounted Warfare Test Bed

== MX ==
- MX – (a) Mail Exchange – (s) Mexico (FIPS 10-4 country code; ISO 3166 digram) – (p) Missile eXperimental
- MXN – (s) Mexican peso (ISO 4217 currency code)

== MY ==
- my – (s) Burmese language (ISO 639-1 code)
- MY – (s) Malaysia (FIPS 10-4 country code; ISO 3166 digram)
- mya – (s) Burmese language (ISO 639-2 code) – (i) million years ago
- MYOB – (i) Mind Your Own Business
- MYR – (s) Malaysian ringgit (ISO 4217 currency code)
- MYS – (s) Malaysia (ISO 3166 trigram)
- MYT – (s) Mayotte (ISO 3166 trigram)

== MZ ==
- MZ – (i) Mach-Zehnder (interferometer) – (s) Magnetic Azimuth – (i) Move, Zig (Zero Wing) – (s) Mozambique (FIPS 10-4 country code; ISO 3166 digram)
- MZN – (s) Mozambique metical (ISO 4217 currency code)
