= MRTS =

The abbreviation MRTS is most commonly used to refer to Mass Rapid Transit System.

The abbreviation MRTS may also refer to:

- Chennai Mass Rapid Transit System, abbreviated MRTS
- Magnetic Reversal Time Scale, a term related to Geomagnetic reversal
- Marginal Rate of Technical Substitution, a term used in the study of economics
- Multi Radar Tracking System, a type of processing of one or more radar sensors in Air traffic control
- Mobile Response Trailer System, a system of shelters transported in a 53-foot wheeled trailer for use in emergency response

== See also ==
- MRT (disambiguation)
