= Mco (disambiguation) =

MCO is the IATA airport code for the Orlando International Airport.

MCO may also refer to:

== Abbreviations ==
- Malaysian movement control order, a lockdown measure by Malaysia during COVID-19 pandemic
- Managed Care Organization
- Manitoba Chamber Orchestra
- Manufacturer’s Certificate of Origin
- Marine Corps Order
- Mars Climate Orbiter
- MC Oran, an Algerian association football club
- MC Oujda, a Moroccan association football club
- MegaCon Orlando, a large fan convention in Orlando
- Millennial Choirs and Orchestras
- MinecraftOnline, a Minecraft multiplayer server
- Miscellaneous Charges Order, a coupon used to process the payment of travel arrangements
- Modern Chess Openings, a reference book on chess openings
- Moscow Chamber Orchestra
- Motorsport Club of Ottawa
- Motor City Online, a massively multiplayer online racing game
- Member, College of Organists, an honorific

== Codes ==
- MCO, the ISO 3166 trigram for the country of Monaco
- MCO, the ISO 639-3 code for Coatlán Mixe
- MCO, the NYSE code for Moody's Corporation
- MCO, the UK National Rail station code for Manchester Oxford Road railway station
