= MSO =

MSO may refer to:

== Orchestras ==
- Madison Symphony Orchestra, of Madison, Wisconsin, U.S.
- Melbourne Symphony Orchestra, of Melbourne, Victoria, Australia
- Melbourne Ska Orchestra, of Melbourne, Victoria, Australia
- Milwaukee Symphony Orchestra, of Milwaukee, Wisconsin, U.S.
- Monroe Symphony Orchestra, of Monroe, Louisiana, U.S.
- Montreal Symphony Orchestra, of Montreal, Quebec, Canada

== Businesses and organizations ==
- Martha Stewart Living Omnimedia, a media and merchandising company
- McLaren Special Operations of McLaren Automotive
- Mind Sports Organisation, a vehicle for promoting mental-skill games
  - Mind Sports Olympiad

== Science and technology ==
- Methionine sulfoximine, a chemical compound
- Multiple system operator, an operator of multiple cable or direct-broadcast satellite TV systems
- Murashige and Skoog medium, a plant growth medium used in laboratories for cellular cultivation
- Mixed-signal oscilloscope
- Monadic second-order logic, in mathematical logic

== Transportation ==
- Michigan Southern Railroad (1989), reporting markm MSO
- Missoula Montana Airport, in Montana, U.S., IATA code MSO
- Moston railway station, in Manchester, England, station code MSO

== Other uses ==
- Maritime security operations, combatting sea–based terrorism and other illegal activities
- Manufacturer Statement of Origin, or Manufacturer's Certificate of Origin
- Mountain Skies Observatory, in Wyoming, U.S.
- A US Navy hull classification symbol: Minesweeper, ocean (MSO)
- Mars Science Orbiter, a proposed spacecraft
- Municipal Services Office (Singapore), a government office
