= MCDL =

MCDL may refer to:

- 1450, MCDL in Roman numerals
- Mai-chan's Daily Life
- Mason County District Library
- Miguel de Cervantes Digital Library
- Model Composition Definition Language
- modern controlled dream lab
- Modular Chemical Descriptor Language
- Motor City Disassembly Line
- Motor Controller Data Link
