= MDO =

MDO may refer to:

- Marine diesel oil, a type of distillate diesel oil
- MDO (band), a Latin American pop/rock band from Puerto Rico
- Medium density overlay, a type of plywood
- Mixed-domain oscilloscope, a type of oscilloscope used for FFT-based spectrum analyzer functionality
- Multidisciplinary design optimization, in engineering
- Multi-Domain Operations, the United States Army's central concept of operations
- Music Development Office, a music organisation in South Australia
