= MVFC =

MVFC may refer to:

- Magheralin Village F.C.
- Malden Vale F.C.
- Melbourne Victory FC
- Missouri Valley Football Conference
- Moonee Valley Football Club
- Musei Vaticani Football Club
