= MTR (disambiguation) =

MTR is the Mass Transit Railway, the public transport network of Hong Kong.

MTR may also refer to:

== Organisations ==
- MTR Corporation, the corporation that runs the MTR
- Mavalli Tiffin Room, an Indian food company
  - MTR Foods, a food products company based in Bengaluru, India
- Melbourne Talk Radio, a former radio station in Victoria, Australia
- Memphis Teacher Residency, Memphis, Tennessee, US
- MTR Gaming Group, a former gaming company in West Virginia, US
- Roman Traditional Movement (Movimento Tradizionale Romano), in Italy
- Museum of Television & Radio (MT&R), American cultural institution, now the Paley Center for Media
- Goodyear Tire and Rubber Company (MT/R)
- Mesa Royalty Trust (NYSE stock symbol: MTR), a natural gas royalty trust

=== Transportation ===
- Los Garzones Airport (IATA code), Montería, Córdoba, Colombia
- Montreal Central Station (Amtrak code), Quebec, Canada
- MTR Corporation, operator of Hong Kong Mass Transit Railway, and MTR Crossrail
  - MTR Properties
- MTR Western, a motorcoach operator in North America
- Matraman railway station (station code MTR), in East Jakarta, Indonesia
- Montour Railroad (reporting mark), a former railroad in Pennsylvania, US

== Science and technology ==
- Materials testing reactor, a research reactor type
- Materials Testing Reactor, Idaho, US
- Mill test report (metals industry)
- Methionine synthase, responsible for the regeneration of methionine from homocysteine
- MTR (software), or My traceroute, a network diagnostic tool
- Multitrack recording, a method of sound recording

== Other uses ==
- Code for Matraman railway station in Jakarta, Indonesia
- Mobile Termination Rate, between telecoms operators
- Mountaintop removal mining, in coal mining

== See also ==
- MRT (disambiguation)
