= MSSA =

MSSA may refer to:

- Member of the Order of the Star of South Africa
- Methicillin-sensitive Staphylococcus aureus, a subspecies of bacterium
- Military Selective Service Act, a law establishing the current Selective Service System in the United States
- Military-style semi-automatic, a firearm (abbreviation commonly used in New Zealand)
- Mind Sports South Africa
- Montreal Student Space Associations
- MSSA Chemical company, a French chemical company, also known as Métaux Spéciaux
- Master of Science in Social Administration, master's degree from the Mandel School at Case Western Reserve University, equivalent to a master of social work
- Multi-channel/-variate Singular spectrum analysis, an extension of the SSA technique
