= Mek =

Mek may refer to:

- Mek people, an indigenous tribe of West Papua, Indonesia
- Mek languages, a family of Papuan languages spoken by the Mek peoples
- Mek (comics), a comic mini-series by Warren Ellis
- MEK Compound, in Fallujah, Iraq, a compound used by the U.S. military from 2003 to 2009
- Master encryption key, a type of key in cryptography
- Methyl ethyl ketone or butanone, a solvent, used also to weld some plastics
- Mitogen-activated protein kinase kinase, an important enzyme in biochemical MAPK/ERK pathways
- Mu Epsilon Kappa Society, an organization of anime clubs
- Meelo Evaru Koteeswarudu, a Telugu television show
- Magyar Elektronikus Könyvtár or Hungarian Electronic Library, a digital library
- Mojahedin-e Khalq or People's Mujahedin of Iran, an exiled Iranian organization
- Mobile Einsatzkommandos, German police special units
- Mek, variant of Makk, a royal title used in the Sudan
