= MSB =

MSB may refer to:

== Business ==
- Money services business, a legal term used by financial regulators to describe businesses that transmit or convert money

== Culture ==
- The Magic School Bus, a series of children's books about science
- Mario Slam Basketball, a 2006 video game for the Nintendo DS; aka Mario Hoops 3-on-3
- Mario Superstar Baseball, a 2005 video game for the Nintendo GameCube
- Le Mans Sarthe Basket a French basketball team
- Megalo Strike Back, a song by Toby Fox on the album EarthBound: I Miss You (2012)
- Melbourne Staff Band, the premier brass band of the Salvation Army in Australia
- Michael Stanley Band, a heartland rock band from Cleveland, United States
  - MSB (album), a 1982 studio album by Michael Stanley

== Government and politics ==
- Main Support Battalion, a former U.S. Army logistics formation
- Maritime Services Board, a former government agency in New South Wales, Australia
- Bureau of Investigation and Statistics (Military Investigation and Statistics Bureau), the military intelligence agency of the Republic of China before 1946.
- Myndigheten för samhällsskydd och beredskap, the Swedish Civil Contingencies Agency
- Ministry of National Defence (Turkey), MSB is shorthand for Milli Savunma Bakanlığı which means Ministry Of National Defence

== Science and technology ==
- Media Stream Broadcast, a communications protocol by Microsoft
- 1,4-Bis(2-methylstyryl) benzene, also known as p-Bis(o-methylstyryl) benzene and abbreviated Bis-MSB, a wavelength shifting compound used in liquid scintillators
- Microsoft Surface Book, a portable computer
- Millennium Seed Bank, an international conservation project for storing plant seeds
- Molecular Systems Biology, an open-access, peer-reviewed scientific journal
- Most significant bit, the bit with the highest significance in a word
- Most significant byte, the highest byte in a multi-byte number
- Mrs. Stewart's Bluing, a brand of fabric bluing agent
- MSB, the Southern Railway station code for Chennai Beach railway station, Chennai, India

== Educational institutions ==
- Marriott School of Business at Brigham Young University
- Mason School of Business at the College of William & Mary
- McDonough School of Business at Georgetown University
- Mediterranean School of Business, is the first Business School of South Mediterranean University (SMU) in Tunisia
- Michigan School for the Blind, a school for the blind in Michigan, United States
- Minnesota School of Business & Globe University, a higher education network based in Minnesota, United States
- Mississippi School for the Blind, a school for the blind in Mississippi, United States
- Missouri School for the Blind, a school for the Missouri, United States
- MSB Educational Institute, a world-wide network of Islamic schools
- Mount St Benedict College, a school in Sydney, Australia
- Medical Sciences Building (University of Toronto)

== Other ==
- Myanmar Standard Bible, a translation of the Bible into the Burmese language
