= MIAA =

MIAA may refer to:

- Maine Intercollegiate Athletic Association, defunct athletic conference of schools in Maine
- Manila International Airport Authority, transportation agency in the Philippines
- Maryland Interscholastic Athletic Association, high school athletic conference for private schools in the Baltimore Metro area
- Massachusetts Interscholastic Athletic Association, high school athletic association governing 33 varsity sports throughout Massachusetts
- Michigan Intercollegiate Athletic Association, athletic conference of NCAA Division III schools in Michigan and Indiana
- Mid-America Intercollegiate Athletics Association, athletic conference of NCAA Division II schools in Kansas, Missouri, Nebraska, and Oklahoma
- TRNA dimethylallyltransferase, an enzyme
