= MBR =

MBR may refer to:

== Science and technology ==
=== Computing ===
- Master boot record, the first sector of a partitioned data storage device, used for booting
- Memory buffer register
- Minimum bounding rectangle
- Minimum bit rate

=== Other fields ===
- Membrane bioreactor, in waste disposal
- Microwave background radiation, in cosmology
- Minimum bend radius, for installation of cables and pipes
- MBR Explorer, planned mission to several main belt asteroids

== Publications ==
- The Malaysia Book of Records
- Mountain Bike Rider, a British magazine

== Military ==
- Main battle rifle
- Morskoi Blizhniy Razvedchik, (Russian for "Naval Short Range Reconnaissance"), a class of flying boats, like the Beriev MBR-2

== Places ==
- Middlesbrough railway station, England (by GBR code)
- Mohammed Bin Rashid Library, Dubai, United Arab Emirates

== Other uses ==
- Maximum base rent, as used in rent control in New York
- Minerações Brasileiras Reunidas, an iron mining business
- Master Boot Record (band), an Italian synth metal band

== See also ==
- Movimiento Bolivariano Revolucionario 200 (MBR-200), a leftist political movement founded by Hugo Chávez in Venezuela
