= MTT =

MTT can refer to:

== People ==
- Michael Tilson Thomas (1944–2026), American musician, conductor, pianist

== Technology and science ==
- Meaning–text theory, a theory in linguistics
- MTT assay using dimethyl thiazolyl diphenyl tetrazolium salt, a type of tetrazole
- Multi-transaction translator, a particular functional unit in USB hubs

== Business ==
- Maritime Telephone and Telegraph Company, later known as MTT or MT&T

== Transport ==
- Metropolitan Transport Trust, transport authority in Western Australia from 1958 to 2003
- Minatitlán/Coatzacoalcos National Airport, IATA code MTT
- Municipal Tramways Trust, former body in Adelaide, South Australia

== Fiction ==
- Multi-troop transport vehicle in Star Wars
- Mettaton, a robot character from Undertale

== Other ==
- Maria Theresa thaler, former Austrian coin used in many areas
- Pashtun Tahafuz Movement (PTM), formerly known as the Mehsud Tahafuz Tehrik (MTT), a human rights movement in Pakistan for the Pashtun people
- Multi-table tournament, a type of poker tournament
- Modus tollens, a kind of rule of inference also known as modus tollendo tollens
