= MWI =

MWI is the country code for Malawi in several country code systems.

MWI may also refer to:

== Science and technology ==
- Many-worlds interpretation, in quantum mechanics
- Message-waiting indicator, in telephony
- Mobile Web Initiative, in Mobile Web
- Maths Week Ireland, an all-island (Republic of Ireland and Northern Ireland) mathematics outreach initiative

== Other uses ==
- Ministry of Water and Irrigation, in Water supply and sanitation in Jordan
- Warsaw Modlin Airport (IATA: WMI)
- Mountain Warfare Instructor, in Mountain Warfare Training Center

== See also ==
- MW-1
