= MPF =

MPF may refer to:

== Law enforcement ==
- Malta Police Force, the national police force of Malta
- Mauritius Police Force, the national police force of the Republic of Mauritius
- Myanmar Police Force, the national police force of Myanmar (Burma)
- Ministerio Publico Federal, a branch of the Public Procecutor's Office in Brazil

== U.S. military ==
- Maritime Prepositioning Force, U.S. military supply ships
- Mobile Protected Firepower, a light tank acquisition program

== Other uses ==
- Mandatory Provident Fund, a pension scheme of Hong Kong
- Mam language (ISO-639: mpf)
- Manchester Punk Festival, a music festival in the United Kingdom, held in Manchester, England
- Massachusetts Promise Fellowship, a non-profit organization
- Maturation-promoting factor, or mitosis-promoting factor, in cell biology
- Metallic path facilities, in telecommunications
- Methodist Peace Fellowship, a pacifist organization
- Mortgage Partnership Finance, a program run by the U.S. Federal Home Loan Banks
- Mouvement pour la France (Movement for France), a French political party
- Multi-Purpose Food, a nutritional product developed with support from Clifford Clinton
