= MH =

MH or mH may refer to:

== Businesses and organizations ==
- Malaysia Airlines, by IATA airline designator
- Menntaskólinn við Hamrahlíð, a gymnasium in Reykjavík, Iceland
- Miami Heat, an NBA basketball team
- Our Homeland Movement (Mi Hazánk), a Hungarian political party

== Places ==
- Mahalle, (abbreviated mh. on maps) a Turkish residential district
- Maharashtra, a state of western India (ISO 3166-2 code MH)
- Marshall Islands (ISO 3166-1 alpha-2 country code and postal symbol MH)
- County Meath, Ireland (code MH)
- Montserrat (FIPS PUB 10-4 territory code MH)
- Morgan Hill, California

== People ==
=== Politics ===
- Mohammad Hatta, 1st Vice President of Indonesia, 3rd Prime Minister of Indonesia, 4th Minister of Defense of Indonesia and 4th Foreign Minister of Indonesia

=== Musicians ===
- Michael Hutchence, frontman and lead singer of Australian rock band INXS

=== Technologists ===
- Michael Hood, internet researcher

== Science and technology ==
- .mh, the Internet country code top-level domain for Marshall Islands
- Malignant hyperthermia, in medicine
- Masked hypertension, the phenomenon where a patient with hypertension has normotension in a clinical setting
- Millihenry (mH), an SI unit of inductance
- Megahenry (MH)
- Middle Helladic, an archaeological period
- millihour (mh), a non-SI unit of time
- Megahour (Mh)
- Metre hour (m h), a unit of absement
- Metre per hour (m/h), a unit of speed
- Metal-halide lamp, a type of electrical gas-discharge lamp
- MH Message Handling System, an email client
- MH, a symbol for a silt of high plasticity in the Unified Soil Classification System

== Other uses ==
- Mh (digraph), in linguistics
- MH (album), an album by Marques Houston
- Marques Houston (born 1981), American R&B singer and actor
- Marshallese language, ISO 639-1 language code 'mh'
- Marble Hornets, American web series
- Master of Humanities, a graduate degree in the United States
- Medal of Honor (disambiguation), awarded by several countries
- Mental health
- MIT Mystery Hunt, an annual puzzle event
- Mount Hood Railroad, reporting mark
- Monster Hunter, a video game series
- Monster High, a fashion doll franchise
