= MBCS =

MBCS may refer to:

- Member of the Chartered Institute for I.T., denoting membership at a professional level
- Multi-byte character set, a class of character encodings in computing
- Marine Biology Case Study, a discontinued case study in the AP Computer Science program
