= MNE =

MNE, mne, or MnE may refer to:

== Codes ==
- MNE, the international vehicle registration code and ISO 3166-1 alpha-3 country code for Montenegro
- MNE, the National Rail station code for Manea railway station, Fenland, Cambridgeshire, England
- mne, the ISO 639-2 code for the Naba language

== Other uses ==
- Ministry of Foreign Affairs (Portugal) (Ministério dos Negócios Estrangeiros), the Portuguese foreign affairs ministry
- Mne, abbreviation of the entry rank of Marine in the Royal Marines
- Modern English (MnE), the form of the language spoken from roughly 1550 to the present
- Multinational enterprise, a multinational corporation

== See also ==
- Matters of Environmental Significance under the EPBC Act in Australia, known as MNES
