= MGA =

MGA can refer to:

== Biology and medicine ==
- 3-Methylglutaconic aciduria, a metabolic disorder
- Mga (protein), a DNA-binding protein found in Streptococcus pyogenes (group A Streptococcus)
- Mga, max dimerization protein, a protein in humans encoded by the MGA gene
- Megestrol acetate or melengestrol acetate, progestin medications

== Business and finance ==
- Malagasy ariary, currency of Madagascar by ISO 4217 currency code
- Managing general agent, a type of insurance agent
- Mutual Gains Approach, a process model for negotiating while protecting relationships and reputation

== Education ==
- Master of Governmental Administration, a degree program offered by the Fels Institute of Government, University of Pennsylvania, US
- Master of Global Affairs, a degree program offered by the Munk School of Global Affairs & Public Policy at the University of Toronto, Canada

== Entertainment ==
- Marriott's Great America, earlier name of Great America, former name of amusement parks
- Metal Gear Acid, a PlayStation Portable video game by Konami
- Metal Gear Arcade, a reworked arcade version of the Metal Gear Online video game by Konami
- MGA Entertainment, a toy production company
- Mint Green Army, the football team of St Anne's College, Oxford

== Geography ==
- Map Grid of Australia, a mapping system based on the Universal Transverse Mercator coordinate system
- Mga (river) in Leningrad Oblast, Russia
- Mga, an urban-type settlement in Leningrad Oblast, Russia

== Information technology ==
- Matrox, producer of video card components
- Monochrome Graphics Adapter, either related to or synonymous with the Hercules Graphics Card
- Multigenerational architecture, a method of database transactions handling related to multiversion concurrency control

== Organizations ==
- Malta Gaming Authority, Malta's gaming control board
- Midwestern Governors Association, a nonprofit organization of the 12 American Midwest states' governors

== Transport ==
- MGA, IATA code for Augusto C. Sandino International Airport (Managua International Airport) in Managua, Nicaragua
- Monongahela Railway, a former coal-hauling short line railroad in the United States
- MG MGA, a popular British sports car manufactured between 1955 and 1962 by MG

== Other uses ==
- Monash Gallery of Art, former name of the Museum of Australian Photography, Melbourne, Australia
- Multiple gender attraction, a term for those attracted to more than one gender
