= MTU =

MTU may refer to:

== Companies ==
- Motoren- und Turbinen-Union, a former German engine manufacturer, now split into two companies:
  - MTU Aero Engines, a German aircraft engine manufacturer
  - MTU Friedrichshafen, an international diesel engine manufacturer
- Manitou Group, French manufacturer of forklifts, cherry pickers etc. (Euronext symbol: MTU)
- Mitsubishi UFJ Financial Group, New York Stock Exchange symbol MTU

== Universities and colleges ==
- Madinatul Uloom Al Islamiya, Islamic boarding college in England
- Mahamaya Technical University, an Indian public university
- Mandalay Technological University, a Burmese public university
- Michigan Technological University, an American public university
- Mohajer Institute of Technology of Isfahan, an Iranian professional-vocational university
- Mountain Top University, a Nigerian private university
- Munster Technological University, an Irish public university

== Other ==
- Maximum transmission unit, the size of the largest packet that a network protocol can transmit
- Metric ton unit, in metals trading
- Mobile Testing Unit, for COVID-19 in England, by NHS Test and Trace
- Migrants' Trade Union in Korea, represents foreign workers in South Korea
