= MMO (disambiguation) =

MMO, or massively multiplayer online game, is a video game that can be played by many people simultaneously.

MMO or mmo may also refer to:

== Entertainment ==
- Music Minus One, a record company in Westchester, New York

== Science and technology ==
- Methane monooxygenase, an enzyme
- Maximum operating Mach number, denoted M_{MO}
- Mercury Magnetospheric Orbiter, the Japanese Mercury orbiter flown with the BepiColombo spacecraft
- Mini-Mag Orion, a proposed type of spacecraft propulsion
- Mixed metal oxide, a class of materials often used in electrodes

== Other uses ==
- Means, motive, and opportunity, the "indicators of suspicion"
- Minimum municipal obligation, minimum contribution to a pension plan
- Maio Airport, in Cape Verde, IATA code
- Melton Mowbray railway station, England (National Rail station code MMO)
- Marine Management Organisation, UK government body
- Marine mammal observer, a professional in environmental consulting
- Mangga Buang language, an ISO 639-3 code

== See also ==
- Military Merit Order (disambiguation)
