= MKG =

MKG may refer to:

- Mal Kelapa Gading, a shopping mall in North Jakarta, Indonesia
- Michael Kidd-Gilchrist, American basketball player
- Mohandas Karamchand Gandhi, Indian leader
- Musashi-Kosugi Station, JR East station code
- Muskegon County Airport (IATA code MKG)
- Gotland Military Command
- MKG Group, European company
- mkg, former abbreviation for kilopondmetre
- MK Gallery
