= MHRA =

MHRA may refer to:

== Organisations ==
- Medicines and Healthcare products Regulatory Agency, UK
- Michigan Hot Rod Association, US
- Modern Humanities Research Association, UK
  - MHRA Style Guide, an academic style guide

== Other uses ==
- Men's human rights activism
