= MBM =

MBM may refer to:

== Businesses and organisations ==
- MBM (architecture firm), a Spanish company
- Meadowbrook Meat Company, a subsidiary of McLane Company
- McKee-Berger-Mansueto, an American construction company
  - MBM scandal
- M.B.M. Engineering College, in Jodhpur, India

== Sports ==
- MBM (automobile), a Swiss Formula One racing car
- MBM Motorsports, an American stock car racing team

== Other uses ==
- MBM (file format), a container for a set of bitmap images
- Maayong Buntag Mindanao, the regional morning show of ABS-CBN Davao in the Philippines
- Master of Business and Management, a postgraduate degree
- Mambalam railway station, Chennai, Tamil Nadu, India, station code MBM
- Meat and bone meal, a product of the rendering industry
- Meat Beat Manifesto, a British electronic music group
- Miri City Council (Majlis Bandaraya Miri), a city council in Sarawak, Malaysia
- Mbama language, ISO 639-3 language code mbm
- MBM (drug), a psychedelic-related drug
