= MOPE =

MOPE may refer to:

- Ministry of Public Education
- Ministry of Population and Environment, a government ministry in Nepal
- Ministry of Petroleum and Energy, a government ministry in Norway
- Ministry of the Environment, Climate and Energy, a government ministry in Slovenia
- Ministry of Power and Energy, a government ministry in Sri Lanka
- Mope, a song by the Bloodhound Gang.
- Mormon Pope, a slang term for the president of the Church of Jesus Christ of Latter-day Saints.
- "Most oppressed people ever", an assertion about Irish history coined by Liam Kennedy in Unhappy the Land
- Mope a 2019 film dramatizing the story of Stephen Clancy Hill.

== See also ==
- Moped, a low power motorcycle with pedals
