= MSPB =

MSPB may refer to:

- MSP Batna, an Algerian Football club
- United States Merit Systems Protection Board, a United States agency
