= Monte Agliale Supernovae and Asteroid Survey =

Astronomical survey

The Monte Agliale Supernovae and Asteroid Survey (MASAS) is an offshoot of the Monte Agliale Supernovae Search (MASS), conducted from the Monte Agliale Astronomical Observatory at Monte Agliale near Borgo a Mozzano, Tuscany, Italy.

It has netted, on September 11, 2000 (IAUC 7494, September 22, 2000), the discovery by Matteo M. M. Santangelo of supernova SN 2000dl in the distant galaxy UGC 1191, near the center of the galaxy cluster Abell 240. The distance is estimated at 1,000,000,000 light-years, making it the 'first' most distant supernova discovered by an amateur.
