= MSPA =

MSPA may refer to:

- Maritime Security Patrol Area, patrol zone in the Gulf of Aden, between Somalia and Yemen
- Migrant and Seasonal Agricultural Workers Protection Act, United States law
- Mississippi Association of Independent Schools, formerly the Mississippi Private School Association
- MspA porin, protein produced by mycobacteria
- Member, Society of Pension Actuaries; see American Society of Pension Professionals and Actuaries
- MS Paint Adventures, a group of web-comics by Andrew Hussie
- Multiple Spacecraft Per Aperture, shared antenna dish usage. see NASA Deep Space Network

== See also ==
- MSPAS
