= MNP =

MNP can stand for:

- Manipur, a state in northeastern India (postal code)
- Magnetic nanoparticles
- Manor Park railway station, a National Rail station in England
- 2-methyl-2-nitrosopropane
- Microcom Networking Protocol, for modems
- MNP LLP (Meyers Norris Penny) - a Canadian accounting firm headquartered in Calgary, Alberta
- Mobile number portability, of telephone numbers
- National Museum, Poznań
- National Order Party (Milli Nizam Partisi), Turkey
- Netherlands Environmental Assessment Agency (Milieu en Natuur Planbureau)
- Northern Mariana Islands, in the Pacific
- Northern Min, a Chinese language
