= Modular Chemical Descriptor Language =

Method of representation of molecular structures

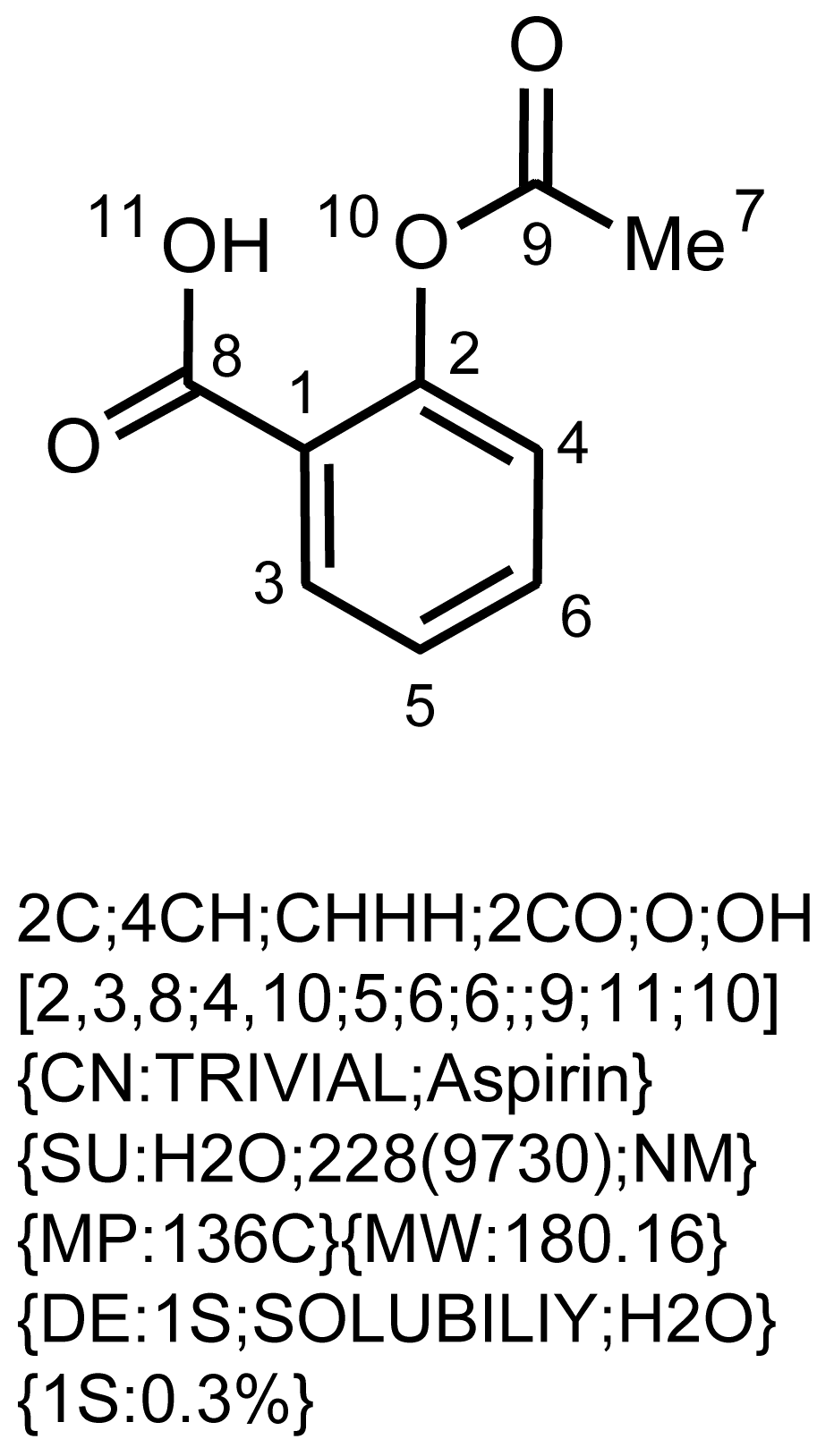
MCDL notation, including supplementary data, of Aspirin

The Modular Chemical Descriptor Language (MCDL) is a method for representing of molecular structures and pertinent molecular information using linear descriptors. MCDL files are designed for cross-platform transfer and manipulation of compound-specific chemical data. They consist of sets of unique information (fragments, connections) and nonunique information (coordinates, ID numbers, spectra, physical-chemical properties). The nonunique portion of the descriptor can be customized, thus providing end-user flexibility. Unique representation of atom and double bond stereochemistry is contrived as separate modules.

== Software implementation ==
Modular Chemical Descriptor Language is currently implemented in several software packages. A JAVA-based MCDL editor with intelligent generation of 2D coordinates is available as open source software under GPL. MCDL translator is also included in Open Babel starting from version 2.3.1.

== See also ==
- Chemical file format
