= MFG =

MFG can refer to:

- Madagascar Fauna Group, a conservation organization working in Germany with headquarters in Berlin and Munich
- Magellan Financial Group's ticker symbol on the Australian Securities Exchange
- An abbreviation for manufacturing
- Marinefliegergeschwader, an aviation unit of the German Navy
- Mean field games
- MFG.com, an online marketplace serving the global manufacturing community
- MfG or mfg, German-language abbreviation for mit freundlichem Gruß or mit freundlichen Grüßen, with the meaning of Best Regards, very common in electronic communication
- "MfG", a song by Die Fantastischen Vier referring to this greeting
- Middle frontal gyrus, a brain region
- Mixed flowing gas testing, a type of laboratory environmental testing
- Mizuho Financial Group's ticker symbol on the New York Stock Exchange
- Motor Fuel Group, operator of filling stations and convenience stores in the United Kingdom
- Muzaffarabad Airport, IATA code
- Multi Frame Generation, a technology from NVIDIA that significantly increases the frame rate in games
- Mount Fuji Ghost, a fictional racing event in MF Ghost
- MFG – Austria People – Freedom – Fundamental Rights - Austrian anti-vaccination party
