= MJD =

MJD may refer to:

- Modified Julian Date, see Julian day § Variants
- Machado–Joseph disease
- Maurice Jones-Drew, former NFL running back
- Mizo Janata Dal, an Indian political party
- Moenjodaro Airport (IATA: MJD), Sindh, Pakistan
- Democratic Progressive Party, Chinese transliteration of "Minjindang"
