= MALD =

MALD or Mald may refer to:

- Andrew Mald, a Papua New Guinean politician
- Master of Arts in Law and Diplomacy, a degree
- ADM-160 MALD, a decoy missile developed by the United States
