= Magheralin Village F.C. =

Magheralin Village Football Club
- Nicknames: The Ducks; The Village
- Founded: 2017
- Ground: Dromore Leisure Centre
- Chairman: Gary Patterson
- Manager: Graeme Hynds
- League: Mid-Ulster Football League

Magheralin Village Football Club, referred to as Magheralin Village, or simply Magheralin, is an intermediate-level football club based in Magheralin, County Down, Northern Ireland. Magheralin play in the Mid-Ulster Football League. They are a part of the Mid-Ulster Football Association. They are nicknamed "the ducks".

The club was founded in 2017 by Magheralin locals, and they play their home games at Dromore Leisure Centre on Lurgan Road, Dromore. The club competes in the Irish Cup. Magheralin Village have reserves team that play in the Mid Ulster Reserves League.

Magheralin's derby rivals are Moira Albion F.C.

== Colours, culture and badge ==
Magheralin Village play in blue and white, with their away colours being orange and black.

The badge features Magheralin church tower, and ducks, a tribute to the song Ducks of Magheralin, with its namesake coming from local weavers that used duck grease as lubrication for their looms. Magheralin Village F.C. hold an annual Duck Race.

The club has paid tribute in their badge to player Niall O'Hanlon, who died in May 2018. Magheralin Village described him as " "the heart and soul of our wee football club and village".

== Club honours ==
- Mid-Ulster Football League
  - Division 4
    - 2018/19
