= MBA (disambiguation) =

MBA (Master of Business Administration) is a master's degree.

MBA or Mba may refer to:

== Organizations ==
- Maldives Basketball Association
- Manitoba Bar Association
- Marine Biological Association of the United Kingdom
- Maschienenbau und Bahnbedarf AG, name used by Orenstein & Koppel in Nazi Germany
- Metropolitan Basketball Association, now-defunct basketball league in the Philippines
- Media Bloggers Association, US
- Ministry of Border Affairs (Myanmar)
- Montgomery Bell Academy, Nashville, Tennessee, USA
- Morbidelli-Benelli Armi, Italian motorcycle factory
- Mortgage Bankers Association, USA
- Mountain Bothies Association, Scottish huts charity
- MBAssociates, manufacturer of Gyrojet rocket guns

== People ==
- Agapito Mba Mokuy (born 1965), Equatorial Guinean politician
- Léon M'ba, first president of Gabon
- Paul Biyoghé Mba
- Nina Mba
- Stéphane N'Zue Mba

== Places ==
- Moi International Airport, Mombasa, Kenya, IATA code

== Other uses ==
- International Biennale of Architecture in Kraków (Międzynarodowe Biennale Architektury w Krakowie)
- Mba languages
- Methylenebisacrylamide
- Middle Bronze Age
- ICHD classification and diagnosis of migraine#Migraine with brainstem aura
