= MZN =

MZN may refer to:

- Mazandarani language (مَزِروني, ISO 639-3 code "mzn")
- Mozambican metical, currency used in Mozambique
- Modified Ziehl-Neelsen, staining method
