= MLG =

MLG may refer to any of the following:

- Málaga, often used as an abbreviation for the city in Andalusia, southern Spain.
- Major League Gaming, a defunct competitive video gaming league
- Maple Leaf Gardens, a disused arena in Toronto
- Marine Logistics Group, a United States Marine Corps unit
- Middle Low German, a language descended from Old Saxon and the ancestor of modern Low German
- Mennonite Low German, a variety of modern Low German
- MLG Productions, a joint venture between Marvel Animation and Lionsgate
- Main landing gear, the first and more robust group of landing gears in aircraft
- Michelle Lujan Grisham, 32nd Governor of New Mexico
- Multi-level governance, the idea that there are many interacting authority structures in the emergent global political economy
- Multi-link gearbox, an implementation agreement published by the Optical Internetworking Forum
- Mixed-linkage glucan, a polysaccharide
- The IATA airport code for Abdul Rachman Saleh Airport
- The ISO 630 code for the Malagasy language
- MLg United States Geological Survey (USGS) seismic magnitude scale
