= MLS (disambiguation) =

MLS, or Major League Soccer, is a men's professional soccer league in the United States and Canada.

MLS may also refer to:

== Academic degrees ==
- Master of Arts in Liberal Studies or Master of Liberal Studies
- Master of Library and Information Science or Master of Library Science, US and Canada
- Master of Studies in Law or Master of Legal Studies

== Computer technology ==
- Maximum length sequence, a type of pseudorandom binary sequence
- MLS (Making Life Simple) S.A., a Greek software and telecommunications company
- Messaging Layer Security, a key agreement protocol
- Mozilla Location Service, a geolocation service
- Multilayer switch, in computer networking
- Multilevel security

== Other ==
- Maritime Launch Services, a Canadian space transport services company
- Medical laboratory scientist
- Member of the Leibniz Society of Sciences
- Michigan Lutheran Seminary
- Microwave landing system, a radio guidance system
- Microwave limb sounders, measuring microwave emission from Earth's upper atmosphere
- Ministry of Strategic Affairs (Hebrew: המשרד לנושאים אסטרטגיים, HaMisrad LeNos'im Estrategi'im), an Israeli government ministry
- Multi-layer steel, a type of automotive head gasket
- Multiple listing service of real estate brokers
- Myles Lewis-Skelly (born 2006), English footballer
- "MLS", a Gorillaz song from their 2020 album Song Machine, Season One: Strange Timez
- "MLS", a nickname for Myles Lewis-Skelly

== See also ==
- MSL (disambiguation)
