= MKS =

MKS may refer to:

- MKS PAMP, a broker of precious metals
- MKS Inc., a software vendor (formerly Mortice Kern Systems)
- MKS Instruments, an American process control instrumentation company
- MKS system of units of measurement based on the metre, kilogram, and second
- M. K. Stalin, an Indian politician and current Chief Minister of Tamil Nadu
- Lincoln MKS, an automobile produced by the Lincoln division of Ford Motor Company
- Marks & Spencer, stock symbol MKS
- McKusick–Kaufman syndrome, a rare human genetic condition
- Moscow Korean School, a Korean international school in Moscow, Russia
- Mutya Keisha Siobhan, an English girl group
- Międzyzakładowy Komitet Strajkowy or Inter-Enterprise Strike Committee, formed in Gdańsk Shipyard, Poland in 1980
- .mks, a file extension for the Matroska open standard free container format
