= Medical officer =

Medical officer may refer to:

- Physician, a medical doctor in general
- Military physicians who are also commissioned officers
- Medical Officer for Health, the senior government official of a health department
