= MZ =

MZ may refer to:

== Arts and entertainment ==
- MZ, a French rap band formed by members of Les Sages Poètes de la Rue
- MZ (formerly Machine Zone), developer of Game of War: Fire Age and other mobile video games
- Marvel Zombies, a Marvel Comics limited series published in 2005–2006
- Mirmo Zibang!, an anime television series
- Mitteldeutsche Zeitung, a German newspaper
- Mz, Short for Muzi slang word for buddy, pal, mate.

== Places ==
- Mozambique (ISO 3166-1 country code MZ)
  - .mz, the country code top level domain (ccTLD) for Mozambique
- Mizoram, a state in northeast India (ISO 3166-2 code IN-MZ)

== Technology ==
=== Cameras and optics ===
- MZ, a series of single-lens reflex cameras by Pentax
- Mach–Zehnder interferometer, an optical device for using light to determine phase shift variations

=== Computing ===
- MZ executable, a file type in Microsoft MS-DOS
- Mark Zbikowski, a former Microsoft programmer whose initials mark the first two bytes of all (portable) executable files in DOS and Windows (16-, 32- and 64-bit versions)
- Mausezahn, a fast network traffic generator
- Sharp MZ series, a line of personal computers by Sharp

== Transportation ==
- Merpati Nusantara Airlines, a former Indonesia-based airline (IATA code MZ)
- MZ Motorrad- und Zweiradwerk GmbH, a German motorcycle manufacturer
- DSB Class MZ, a series of diesel-electric locomotives built 1967–1978 for Danish railway company Danske Statsbaner (DSB)
- Makedonski Železnici, the government-owned railway company of Macedonia

== Other uses ==
- Mishtara Zva'it, the Military Police Corps of Israel
- Mixe–Zoque languages
- MZ generation, a Korean term to describe Millennials and Generation Z

== See also ==
- Ms., a default form of address for women regardless of their marital status
