= MNT =

MNT may stand for:

- /mnt in Unix, directory including mount points
- Maternal and neonatal tetanus
- Medical nutrition therapy
- MNT (gene), a transcription factor
- Molecular nanotechnology
- Mongolian tögrög, the currency of Mongolia by ISO 4217 currency code
- Mononitrotoluene, or meta-nitrotoluene
- MyNetworkTV, a television broadcast syndication service
- Montserrat, by IAAF country code
- 11β-Methyl-19-nortestosterone, an anabolic-androgenic steroid
- Maleonitriledithiolate, an anion found in compounds such as sodium maleonitriledithiolate
