= MQ =

MQ may refer to:

== Places ==
- Martinique (ISO 3166-1 alpha-2 country code MQ)
- Vehicle registration code in Merseburg-Querfurt, Germany
- Midway Islands (FIPS PUB 10-4 territory code)
- Museumsquartier, a cultural area of Vienna, Austria

== Technology ==
- .mq, Internet country top-level domain code for Martinique
- Magic Quadrant, market research reports
- Metol and hydroquinone, a photographic developer
- Apache ActiveMQ, open source message queue
- Apache RocketMQ, open source messaging and streaming data platform
- Message Queue, software-engineering component
- IBM MQ, IBM computer software

== Weaponry ==
- MQ, an abbreviation used for naming American military drones
  - General Atomics MQ-1 Predator
  - General Atomics MQ-1C Gray Eagle
  - Northrop Grumman MQ-4C Triton
  - Northrop Grumman MQ-8 Fire Scout
  - Northrop Grumman MQ-8C Fire Scout
  - General Atomics MQ-9 Reaper
  - MTC MQ-17 SpyHawk
  - Boeing MQ-25 Stingray

== Other uses ==
- MQ: Transforming Mental Health, a healthcare charity in the UK
- MQ, IATA airline designator for Envoy Air, formerly American Eagle Airlines
  - MQ, formerly the IATA airline designator for Simmons Airlines, a predecessor of American Eagle Airlines
- The Musical Quarterly, an American academic journal
- Mindfulness Questionnaire, a way of measuring mindfulness traits
