= MHL =

MHL may refer to:

- Marshall Islands, ISO, IOC and FIFA country code
- Marshall station (Texas), US, Amtrak code
- Mennonite Historical Library, at Goshen College in Indiana, US
- Mobile High-Definition Link, for connecting portable devices to displays

== Ice hockey leagues ==
- Maritime Junior Hockey League, in Canada
- Minor Hockey League or Molodezhnaya Khokkeinaya Liga, Russia
- Manitoba Hockey League, Canada

== Field hockey leagues ==
- Malaysia Hockey League

== Other uses ==
- Manual handling of loads
- Michael Harris-Love, American physical therapist, clinical researcher, and educator, often referred to as MHL
