= MGB =

MGB may refer to:

== Organisations ==
=== Political alliances in India ===
- Mahagathbandhan (Bihar)
- Mahagathbandhan (Jharkhand)
- Mahagathbandhan (Uttar Pradesh)

=== Others ===
- Mass General Brigham, a Massachusetts-based health care system and research enterprise
- Matematička gimnazija Beograd, a school in Belgrade, Serbia
- Mines and Geosciences Bureau, a Philippine government agency
- Ministry of State Security (Soviet Union) (Ministerstvo Gosudarstvennoi Bezopasnosti), a predecessor of the KGB

== Technology ==
- Matterhorn Gotthard Bahn, a railroad in the Swiss Alps
- Medium Girder Bridge, a modular military bridge
- MG MGB, a British sports car produced 1962–1980
- Motor gunboat, a fast attack boat armed with cannons and guns
- MGB, a Nintendo CPU in some models of the Game Boy

== Other uses ==
- Magandang Gabi... Bayan (Good Evening... Nation), a 1988–2005 Philippine news program
- Matthew Good Band, a Canadian alternative rock group
- Medial geniculate nucleus, or medial geniculate body, a subnucleus of the thalamus in the brain
- Mount Gambier Airport, South Australia (IATA code)
- Mangga Besar railway station, a railway station in Jakarta, Indonesia
