= MCP =

MCP may refer to:

== Businesses and organisations ==
- Macapá International Airport (IATA airport code: MCP), an airport in Brazil
- Malawi Congress Party, a political party in Malawi
- Malayan Communist Party (1930–1989), an insurgent faction in Malaya and Singapore
- Malaysian Communist Party (1983–1987), political party
- Molycorp (NYSE code: MCP), an American mining corporation
- Multispecialty community providers, a development within the English National Health Service
- Mayfield Consumer Products, a family-owned business in Kentucky, US

== Education ==
- Master of City Planning, a degree in urban planning education
- Mission College Preparatory High School, a private Roman Catholic Secondary School in San Luis Obispo, California, US
- Monterey Coast Preparatory School, a private school in Santa Cruz, California, US

== Media and entertainment ==
- Marvel Comics Presents, a Marvel Comics comic-book series
- Master Control Program (Tron), a computer character from the 1982 film Tron
- Mod Coder Pack, in Minecraft modding
- Molecular & Cellular Proteomics, a journal published by the American Society for Biochemistry and Molecular Biology

== Science and technology ==
=== Computing ===
- Burroughs MCP, a Unisys/Burroughs computer operating system
- Microsoft Certified Partner, an independent company that provides Microsoft-related products or services
- Microsoft Certified Professional, a certification from Microsoft
- Macintosh Coprocessor Platform, an expansion card for the Macintosh; see A/ROSE
- Model Context Protocol, a standard for applications to provide context to LLMs

=== Electronics ===
- Mode control panel, an instrument panel in some aircraft cockpits that contains the autopilot controls
- Multi-chip package, in semiconductor packaging technology
- Manual call point, a common device for manual fire alarm activation

=== Medicine and biology ===
- Membrane cofactor protein (CD46), a protein
- Metacarpophalangeal joint, the joints at the proximal end of the fingers, commonly called knuckles
- Methyl-accepting chemotaxis protein, a transmembrane sensor protein of bacteria
- Modified citrus pectin, a form of pectin
- Proteasome endopeptidase complex, an enzyme
- Metoclopramide, a medication to treat nausea and other problems from the digestive system

=== Other science and technology ===
- Microchannel plate, an electron amplification device used in physics
- Minimum convex polygon or convex hull
- Mixed complementarity problem, a formulation in mathematical programming
- Monocalcium phosphate, a salt of calcium and phosphoric acid

== Other uses ==
- Makaa language (ISO 639: mcp), a Bantu language
- Minho Campus Party, a LAN party organized in Portugal
- Multi-currency pricing, a financial service allowing goods and services to be priced in multiple currencies
