= MOFA =

MOFA or Mofa may refer to:

- Ministry of Food and Agriculture (Ghana)
- Ministry of Foreign Affairs, an executive government agency in some countries which is responsible for foreign affairs
- Mofa, a small moped or motorised bicycle.
- Mofa 3, a Norwegian band
- Mofa (Chinese: 末法, pinyin: Mòfǎ), or Mappo (Japanese), the Latter Day of the Law in Buddhism
- Multi Option Fuze, Artillery.
- Mofa language, spoken in Cameroon.
