= MLT =

MLT may refer to:

== People ==
- MLT (hacktivist)

== Computing and technology ==
- Mean Length Turn in wound electrical components
- Mechanized loop testing, in the Loop maintenance operations system
- Media Lovin' Toolkit, TV software
- Metropolis light transport, a computational algorithm
- Modulated lapped transform in mathematics
- Multi-level transmit as in MLT-3 encoding
- Multi-link trunking in networking

== Transportation ==
- Station code for Malton railway station, England
- IATA code for Millinocket Municipal Airport

== Other uses ==
- Master of Laws in Taxation, a college degree
- Medical laboratory technician, US
- MALT1 or MLT, a protein
- Malta
- Trading code for Milton Corporation, Australia
- Mobile Language Team, University of Adelaide
- Modern Literal Taiwanese, an orthography in the Latin alphabet for the Taiwanese language
- Mountlake Terrace, a suburb of Seattle, Washington
