= MWR =

MWR may refer to:

- Michael Waltrip Racing, a NASCAR racing team
- Monthly Weather Review, an American Meteorological Society journal
- Morale, Welfare and Recreation, an American military support network
- Museum of World Religions, a museum in New Taipei, Taiwan
- Microwave Radiometer (MWR), an instrument on the Juno Jupiter orbiter

== See also ==
- Call of Duty: Modern Warfare Reflex
- Call of Duty: Modern Warfare Remastered
