= MSR =

MSR may refer to:

== Science and technology ==
- Macrophage scavenger receptor, a receptor found in macrophages
- Magnetic stripe reader, a device used to read magnetic stripe cards such as credit cards
- M–sigma relation, in astrophysics
- Mars sample return mission, a spaceflight mission to return rock and dust samples collected on Mars
- Mirror self-recognition, in animals through the mirror test
- Molten-salt reactor, an advanced nuclear reactor design

=== Computing ===
- Machine state register, a register used in PowerPC architectures
- Model-specific register, a feature in x86 processors
- Microsoft Reserved Partition, a space-management partition on a computer storage device
- Mining software repositories, a field that analyzes the rich data available in software repositories

== Entertainment ==
- MSR Studios, a New York recording studio
- The Most Serene Republic, a Canadian indie rock band
- Metropolis Street Racer, a Dreamcast racing game
- Mid-season replacement, a television series that premieres in the second half of a traditional season
- Metroid: Samus Returns, a video game
- Mulder Scully Romance, the relationship of the main characters of the television series The X-Files
- March, Strathspey and Reel, common bagpipe tune set
- Monster Studio Records, The in-house music studio for Arknights
- Metal Scar Radio, The in-house music studio for Arknights: Endfield

== Organizations and companies ==
- Market Street Railway (nonprofit), a historic preservation organization in San Francisco, California, U.S.
- Microsoft Research, the research division of Microsoft
- Mountain Safety Research, a US company specializing in outdoor equipment
- Mouvement social révolutionnaire, the French fascist party Revolutionary Social Movement
- Movimiento Social Republicano, the Republican Social Movement political party in Spain
- MSR – The Israel Center for Medical Simulation, Israeli institute for Simulation-Based Medical Education

== Places ==
- Misamis Oriental (ISO sub-national code), a province in the Philippines
- Most Serene Republic, a title in the name of various countries
- Montserrat (ISO 3166-1 code)

== Transportation ==
- EgyptAir (ICAO designator), an Egyptian airline
- Main supply route, a military operations supply route
- Market Street Railway (transit operator), a defunct company in California, US
- Michigan Shore Railroad, US
- Muar State Railway, a defunct railway formerly operating in Malaya (now Malaysia)
- Mumbai Suburban Railway, India
- Muş Airport (IATA airport code), Turkey

== Weapons ==
- Modern sporting rifle or AR-15 style rifle
- Modular Sniper Rifle, a sniper rifle produced by Remington Arms
- Magnum Sniper Rifle or Accuracy International Arctic Warfare, a bolt-action sniper rifle

== Other uses ==
- Market Stability Reserve, a part of the European Union Emissions Trading System
- Milan–San Remo, an annual bicycle race
- Mortgage servicing rights, the rights to collect mortgage payments from a borrower for the benefit of the lender
- Meyer Shank Racing, an American auto racing team
