= MPC =

MPC, Mpc or mpc may refer to:

== Astronomy ==
- Megaparsec (Mpc), unit of length used in astronomy
- Minor Planet Center, Smithsonian Astrophysical Observatory
  - Minor Planet Circulars (MPC, M.P.C. or MPCs), astronomical publication from the Minor Planet Center

== Businesses ==
- Mai-Liao Power Corporation, Taiwan
- Model Products Corporation, model kit manufacturer
- Moving Picture Company, a visual effects company, London, UK
- MPC, maker of encrypted mobile phones
- Marathon Petroleum (NYSE stock symbol MPC)

== Computing and electronics ==
- Akai MPC, series of music workstations
- Command-line client for the Music Player Daemon
- Media Player Classic, a software media player
- MPC Computers, a former US computer maker
- MPC model, a theoretical model for massively parallel computation
- Multimedia PC, a recommended configuration for a personal computer
- Multi-Personal Computer, a line of desktop personal computers released by Columbia Data Products
- Multi Project Chip, sharing costs across projects
- Musepack, an audio codec
- Secure multi-party computation

== Economics ==
- Marginal propensity to consume
- Monetary Policy Committee (United Kingdom)

== Government and politics ==
- Malacañang Press Corps, an organization of Filipino journalists
- Central African Patriotic Movement (MPC), a rebel group in the Central African Republic
- Member of Provincial Council, a member of provincial councils in Sri Lanka
- Mizoram People's Conference, a regional political party in Mizoram, India
- Mobile Passport Control, a mobile app used to pass through USA customs
- Model Penal Code
- Movement for Progressive Change, a political party in Liberia
- Multi-Party Charter, political party alliance in South Africa
- Myanmar Peace Centre

== Military ==
- Marine Personnel Carrier, a US armored personnel carrier
- Military payment certificate, US military currency
- Military Police Corps (United States)
- RAF Mount Pleasant, an RAF base in the Falkland Islands commonly referred to as the Mount Pleasant Complex

== Places ==
- Michael Polanyi Center, Baylor University, Waco, Texas, US
- Milton Peters College, Sint Maarten, operated by the Stichting Voortgezet Onderwijs van de Bovenwindse Eilanden
- Mindanao Polytechnic College, Philippines
- Monterey Peninsula College, California, US

== Science and technology ==
- Magnetic particle clutch, also known as magnetic powder clutch
- Metal phthalocyanine (MPc), a phthalocyanine used in dyeing
- Milk protein concentrate
- Mitochondrial pyruvate carrier
- Model predictive control
- Multi-particle collision dynamics, a particle-based mesoscale simulation technique for complex fluids

== Other uses ==
- Macedonian Orthodox Church (Macedonian: Македонска православна црква, romanized: Makedonska pravoslavna crkva)
- Most placeable candidate, recruiting industry term
- MPC Computers Bowl, a football bowl game
- Myanmar Press Council
