= MSN (disambiguation) =

MSN is a web portal provided by Microsoft.

MSN may also refer to:

== Microsoft ==
- MSN Dial-Up Internet Access (originally The Microsoft Network), the Internet service provider
- MSN Messenger (later Windows Live Messenger), once synonymous with 'MSN' in Internet slang
- List of services by MSN, a list that includes several services Microsoft has rebranded

== Other ==
- Dane County Regional Airport (IATA airport code MSN) in Madison, Wisconsin
- Manufacturer's serial number, a unique identifier assigned by some manufacturers. The abbreviation is typically used by aircraft companies.
- Master of Science in Nursing
- Medium spiny neuron
- Meeker Southern Railroad, which uses the reporting mark 'MSN'
- Meter serial number
- Mountaineer Sports Network, a former business identity of the West Virginia Radio Corporation
- MSN (association football), an acronym for Lionel Messi, Luis Suárez and Neymar, the main attacking trio of Spanish football club FC Barcelona from 2014 to 2017
- MSN, the human gene which produces the moesin protein
- The National Sports Council of Malaysia, Majlis Sukan Negara Malaysia
- Make Some Noise (TV series)

== See also ==
- MSM (disambiguation)
