= MMPR =

MMPR may refer to:

- Licenciado Gustavo Díaz Ordaz International Airport (ICAO code: MMPR), an international airport located at Puerto Vallarta, Jalisco in Mexico
- Marihuana for Medical Purposes Regulations, a set of Canadian regulations enacted in July 2013
- Mighty Morphin Power Rangers, an American live-action superhero children's television series
- Mixed-member proportional representation, a hybrid two-tier voting system
