= MN =

MN may refer to:

== Places ==
- Mongolia (ISO 3166-1 country code)
- Montenegro (former ISO 3166 country code)
- Monaco (FIPS 10-4 country code)
- Minnesota, US (postal abbreviation)
- Manipur, a state in northeast India
- Province of Mantua, or of Mantova, in Italy
- County Monaghan, in Ireland (license plate code)

== Language ==
- Mongolian language (ISO 639-1 code)
- mn (digraph), a combination of letters used in spelling

== Science and technology ==
- Manganese, symbol Mn, a chemical element
- .mn, the Internet country code top-level domain for Mongolia
- Meganewton (MN), a unit of force equal to one million newtons
- millinewton (mN), one-thousandth of a newton
- Membranous nephropathy
- Middle Neolithic, an archaeological period
- Minimum mode, a hardware mode available to Intel 8086 and 8088 processors
- Number average molecular weight (M_{n})
- Mammal Neogene zones, a system of biostratigraphic zones in the stratigraphic record used to correlate mammal-bearing fossil localities of the Neogene period of Europe

== Transport ==
- Kulula.com (IATA airline designator MN)
- Metro-North Railroad, a commuter railroad in New York City
- Indian Railways station code for Meenambakkam railway station, Chennai, Tamil Nadu, India
- Station code for Madiun railway station, East Java, Indonesia

== Other uses ==
- MN (film), a 1954 Filipino movie
- Marine Nationale, the French Navy
- Merle Norman Cosmetics, an American cosmetic company
- Model number, an identifying number for each particular type of product a manufacturer makes
- Maanjiwe nendamowinan, a building on the University of Toronto Mississauga campus
- McGrathNicol, Australian consultancy
