= MKD =

MKD may refer to:

- Macedonian denar, ISO 4217 currency code
- Macedonian language, ISO 639-2 code
- North Macedonia, ISO 3166-1 alpha-3 code and IOC country code
- Mevalonate kinase deficiency, a metabolic disorder
- mkd (software), a documentation extractor
- Mrs. Kasha Davis, American drag queen.
