= MMW =

MMW may refer to:

== Film and television ==
- Malibu's Most Wanted, a 2003 comedy
- Mickey Mouse Works, a Disney animated series, 1999–2000
- Muppets Most Wanted, a 2014 musical comedy

== Music ==
- Medeski Martin & Wood, an American jazz trio
- Miami Music Week, an electronic dance festival in Miami, US

== Other uses ==
- Millimetre wave, of electromagnetic radiation
- MMW, a radar tracking station on Roi-Namur, Marshall Islands

== See also ==
- Radio 97, Australian radio station with cal sign 2MW
