= MJP =

MJP may refer to:

- MJP Architects
- MJP Racing Team Austria
- Modernist Journals Project
- Movement for Justice and Peace
- Majestic Prince
- Manjimup Airport, IATA airport code "MJP"
- Mawbima Janatha Pakshaya
