= MDM =

MDM may refer to:

== Computers and data ==
- Master data management, the organization and control of reference or master data shared by disparate IT systems and groups
- Metadata management, storing and organizing information about other information
- Mobile device management, software for the administration of smartphones and other mobile devices
- Multiplexer-demultiplexer
- Meter data management, data storage and management software

== Entertainment ==
- Melodic death metal, a music genre
- M-D-Emm, a British electronic music group
- Mere Dead Men, a British punk band
- Modern Drunkard, a magazine
- Moi dix Mois, a Japanese metal band
- My Dear Melancholy, an EP by the Weeknd

== Science and medicine ==
- Mdm2 protein, encoded by the MDM2 gene in humans
- Medical decision making, part of differential diagnosis in clinical medicine
- Multiple drafts model, a theory of consciousness
- Portal of Medical Data Models, medical research infrastructure
- Music-dependent memory, a subtype of context-dependent memory

== Organizations and businesses ==
- Democratic Movement of Mozambique (Movimento Democrático de Moçambique), a political party
- Mass Democratic Movement, part of the United Democratic Front in South Africa
- Médecins du Monde (MdM), a medical humanitarian organisation
- Movement for a Democratic Military, a GI antiwar and resistance organization during the Vietnam War
- MDM Bank in Russia

== Other uses ==
- Mario Del Monaco (1915–1982), operatic tenor
- Mayogo language (ISO 639-3:mdm), spoken in the DR Congo
- MDM Observatory, in Arizona
- MDM-1 Fox, a glider aircraft
- MDM Hotel, in Warsaw, Poland
- MDM Motorsports, an American professional stock car racing team
- Mechanically deboned meat, a meat-handling process
- Misinformation, disinformation, and malinformation
- Marshal Residential District (Polish: Marszałkowska Dzielnica Mieszkaniowa, MDM), a housing estate in Warsaw, Poland
