= MCMV =

MCMV may refer to:

- 1905 (in Roman numerals)
- Mine countermeasures vessel
- Two viruses:
  - Mouse cytomegalovirus
  - Maize chlorotic mottle virus
