= MEDLI =

MEDLI may refer to:

- Medli, a character from the videogame The Legend of Zelda: The Wind Waker.
- MSL Entry, Descent, and Landing Instrumentation (MEDLI), a suite of engineering sensors in the Mars Science Laboratory entry vehicle heat shield.
