= MOC =

MOC, MoC, or moc may refer to:

== In government and politics ==
- Member of Congress
- Ministry of Commerce
- Ministry of Communications
- Ministry of Construction
- Ministry of Culture

== In religion ==
- Macedonian Orthodox Church
- Masorti on Campus, a Jewish organization in North America
- Montenegrin Orthodox Church
- Moorish Orthodox Church of America

== In science and technology ==
=== In computing ===
- Microsoft Office Communicator, instant messaging software
- Meta Object Compiler (moc), a code generator used by the Qt development framework
- Model of computation, in computability theory
- Music on Console, a console audio player

=== In spaceflight ===
- Mars Orbiter Camera (formerly Mars Observer Camera), an instrument on NASA's Mars Global Surveyor orbiter
- Mission operations center, in spacecraft operations

=== Other uses in science and technology ===
- Meridional Overturning Circulation, an ocean circulation on Earth
- Method of characteristics, a technique for solving partial differential equations
- Microwave oven capacitor (high voltage)
- Minimum oxygen concentration, a concept in fire safety engineering
- Moc., the standard author abbreviation for naturalist José Mariano Mociño
- Molybdenum carbide (MoC), a hard and stable carbide of molybdenum

== In sports and recreation ==
- Chattanooga Mocs (formerly Moccasins), teams of the University of Tennessee at Chattanooga
- Macedonian Olympic Committee
- Montenegrin Olympic Committee

== Other uses ==
- Man of color
- Management of change (Change management)
- Maintenance of Certification, in U.S. medicine
- Market on close order, a type of order executed at or after the closing of a stock exchange
- Masters of Cinema, a DVD series and website
- Military occupation
- "Mint on card", a description of mint condition in retail or auctioning
- Mocoví language, spoken in Argentina, language code by ISO 639-3
- Montes Claros Airport (IATA code: MOC)
- Mount Olive College, North Carolina, U.S.
- Mozambique, license plate code
- Masculine of center, gender expression terminology
- "My Own Creation" (MOC), a term used within the Lego fandom to refer to a custom model designed by amateurs or fans
