= MMOR =

MMOR may refer to:

- Massively multiplayer online racing
- Master of Management in Operations Research
- Mathematical Methods of Operations Research
