= MPEC =

MPEC may refer to:

- Mathematical programming with equilibrium constraints
- Minor Planet Electronic Circular
