= MMR =

MMR may refer to:

== Science and technology ==
- MMR vaccine, for measles, mumps and rubella
- DNA mismatch repair, a genetic repair pathway
- Mass miniature radiography, a tuberculosis screening technique
- Maternal mortality ratio
- Maternal mortality rate
- Mean-motion resonance, between two orbiting bodies
- Mesozoic Marine Revolution, a burst of evolution
- Micro modular reactor, a subcategory of Small Modular Reactors, much smaller in scale than traditional nuclear reactors

=== Computing ===
- Meet-me room, where telecoms companies can communicate
- Modified Modified READ, Group 4 compression
- Matchmaking rating, in video games

== Places ==
- Myanmar (ISO 3166-1 alpha-3 and UNDP country code)
- Mumbai Metropolitan Region, India
- Manmad Junction railway station (station code: MMR), Maharashtra, India

== Other uses ==
- Marine Mammal Regulations, of Canada
- Master of Marketing Research, a business degree
- Abbreviation formerly used for Melbourne Metro Rail, now known as the Metro Tunnel
- Middle Gorge railway station, Melbourne
