= MADD =

MADD or Madd may refer to:

- Mothers Against Drunk Driving, a nonprofit organization in the United States and Canada that seeks to stop driving with any amount of alcohol in the bloodstream
- Myoadenylate deaminase deficiency or Adenosine monophosphate deaminase deficiency type 1, a metabolic disorder
- Multiple acyl-CoA dehydrogenase deficiency, another name for the genetic disorder Glutaric acidemia type 2
- MADD (gene) or MAP kinase-activating death domain protein
- Madd, the fruit of Saba senegalensis
- Maladaptive Daydreaming Disorder (written MaDD)
- Mixed anxiety–depressive disorder, a psychological disorder
