= MDG (disambiguation) =

MDG is an abbreviation for Millennium Development Goals.

MDG, or mdg, may also refer to:

- Malaysian Dreamgirl, an online reality television program
- MDG, the IATA code for Mudanjiang Hailang Airport in Heilongjiang Province, China
- MDG, the ISO, ITU and NATO code for Madagascar, a sovereign state and island country
- MDG, the National Rail code for Midgham railway station in the county of Berkshire, UK
- Miljøpartiet De Grønne, the Green Party of Norway
- Monocable Detachable Gondola; cf. Aerial lift#Abbreviations
- Musikproduktion Dabringhaus und Grimm, German classical recording company

== See also ==
- Gotland Naval District (Gotlands marindistrikt)
- Gotland Military District (Gotlands militärdistrikt)
