= MHW =

MHW may be an abbreviation for:

- Marine heatwave
- Mbukushu language (ISO 639 code: mhw), spoken in Namibia
- Mean high water
- Mental health worker, a medical abbreviation
- Monster Hunter: World, a 2018 video game
- Monster Hunter Wilds, a 2025 video game
- Monteagudo Airport (IATA: MHW), Bolivia

== See also ==
- MHW-RTG (Multihundred-watt radioisotope thermoelectric generators)
