= Medium density overlay panel =

Medium density overlay panel, or MDO panel, is a paintable surface made of plywood with a weather-resistant resin overlay bonded to the wood by heat and pressure. The overlay, which has at least 27% resin content, resists water, weather, wear and degradation. A similar product with a more rugged, smoother surface is called high density overlay (HDO) plywood.

== Development ==
Originally developed for sign painting and concrete formwork industries, MDO is also used for other applications as a paintable surface. Paint finishes on MDO are up to three times more durable than the same finish applied to ordinary plywood

It is a plywood product, with a paper face overlaid on the plywood substrate with an exterior grade (usually) phenolic adhesive. MDO is designed to have a smooth, paint-receptive surface. One or both faces can be surfaced with paper, and is produced in 4-foot-by-8-foot sheets from 3/8 inches to over 3 inches in thickness.
