= MITS =

MITS may stand for:

- Madhav Institute of Technology and Science (MITS Gwalior), a college in Madhya Pradesh, India
- Micro Instrumentation and Telemetry Systems, an American electronics company known for the Altair 8800
- Mody Institute of Technology and Science, now Mody University, a private women's university in Laxmangarh, India
- Muncie Indiana Transit System, an American bus service
