= MSH =

MSH may refer to:

== Biology and medicine ==
- Melanocyte-stimulating hormone, a hormone produced in the pituitary gland, and related to skin pigmentation
- DNA mismatch repair genes:
  - MSH2
  - MSH3
  - MSH4
  - MSH5
  - MSH6
- Multiple system atrophy
- Mycothiol, an unusual thiol that is found in Actinobacteria

== Computing ==
- Microsoft Surface Hub
- Monad Shell (msh), a former name for the Microsoft Windows PowerShell

== Places ==
- Maharashtra state highway, India
- Markham Stouffville Hospital, Ontario, Canada
- RAFO Masirah airport, Oman (IATA: MSH)
- Mississippi State Hospital, US
- Mossley Hill railway station, England
- Mount St. Helens, volcano in Washington, US
- Mount Sinai Hospital, Toronto, Canada

== Other uses ==
- Mills–Slee–Hill catalogue: Between 1958 and 1961, astronomers Bernard Mills, Bruce Slee, and Eric Hill published the Catalogue of Radio Sources (later known as the MSH Catalogue), surveyed at the Mills Cross Telescope
- Maison des Sciences de L'Homme, a research foundation in Paris, France
- Management Sciences for Health, a non-profit
- Marvel Super Heroes (disambiguation), in entertainment
- Masikoro language, spoken in Madagascar (ISO 639: msh)
