= MNS =

MNS may refer to:

- Maharashtra Navnirman Sena, Indian political party
- The Malaysian Nature Society
- Maki-Nakagawa-Sakata matrix in particle physics
- Ministry of National Security of several countries
- Minneapolis, Northfield and Southern Railway, reporting mark
- Minnesota North Stars, the NHL abbreviation for the franchise now known as the Dallas Stars
- Mirror neuron system
- Mission Need Statement
- MNS antigen system, a variant blood group
- Monday Night Soccer, an Irish television programme
- Movement for a New Society
- National Syndicalists (Portugal), Movimento Nacional-Sindicalista
- Manganese(II) sulfide, chemical symbol MnS
- Mansi language, by ISO 639-3 language code
