= MGS =

MGS may refer to:

== Schools ==
- Maidstone Grammar School, Kent, England, UK
- Manchester Grammar School, England, UK
- Mayo Clinic Graduate School of Biomedical Sciences, U.S.
- Melbourne Grammar School, Australia
- Meldorfer Gelehrtenschule, Germany
- Middleton Grange School, New Zealand

== Science ==
- Magnesium sulfide, an inorganic chemical compound
- Mars Global Surveyor, an American spacecraft launched in 1996
- Medial gastrocnemius strain, an injury of the gastrocnemius muscle in the calf
- Modelling of General Systems, a domain-specific language for biological systems
- Modified Gram-Schmidt, a mathematical method for orthogonalizing a set of vectors; see Gram–Schmidt process § Numerical stability
- Morning glory seeds, a psychedelic drug

== Video games ==
- Metal Gear Solid, another name for the 1987 stealth action video game series Metal Gear
- Metal Gear Solid (1998 video game), a stealth action video game in the Metal Gear series

== Other uses ==
- M1128 mobile gun system, an armored fighting vehicle
- Microsoft Game Studios, a multinational video game and digital entertainment company now called Xbox Game Studios
- MGS (TV station)

== See also ==
- Methodist Girls' School (disambiguation)
- MG (disambiguation)
