= MJ =

MJ may refer to:

== Fictional characters ==
- M.J. Delfino, in Desperate Housewives
- Mary Jane Watson, in Marvel comics
  - Mary Jane Watson (2002 film series character), the film adaptation of the character
- MJ (Marvel Cinematic Universe), a character in the Marvel Cinematic Universe
- Agent MJ, in the film Miss Cast Away and the Island Girls, played by Michael Jackson
- Agent M, in the film Men in Black II, played by Michael Jackson

== People ==
- Mary Jane (disambiguation) § People
- MJ (South Korean singer) (Kim Myung-jun, born 1994), South Korean singer, actor, and model
- MJ Acosta-Ruiz (fl. from 2016), Dominican-American sports reporter
- MJ Cole (born 1973), English DJ and record producer
- MJ Delaney, British television director
- MJ Erb (born 1994), American long-distance runner
- MJ Hegar (born 1976), American U.S. Air Force veteran and former political candidate
- MJ Hibbett (born 1970), English guitarist singer-songwriter
- Mary Jean "MJ" Lastimosa (born 1987), Filipina actress and beauty pageant titleholder
- MJ Lee (born 1987), American political correspondent
- MJ Lenderman (born 1999), American musician
- MJ Long (1939–2018), American architect, lecturer and author
- MJ Mentz (born 1982), South African rugby player
- MJ Pelser (born 1998), South African rugby player
- Mj Rodriguez (born 1991), American actress and singer
- Mary Joy "MJ" Tabal (born 1989), Filipina marathon runner
- M. J. Walker (born 1998), American basketball player in the Israeli Basketball Premier League and NBA
- MJ Williams (born 1995), Welsh footballer
- Mahan Mj (born 1968), Indian mathematician and monk
- Michael Jackson (1958–2009), American singer, songwriter, and dancer
  - MJ the Musical, a 2021 Broadway musical centered on Michael Jackson
    - MJ (album), the cast album to the musical
- Michael Jordan (born 1963), American businessman and former professional basketball player
- Mike Johnson (born 1972), Speaker of the United States House of Representatives since 2023

== Science ==
- Megajoule (MJ), or millijoule (mJ), units of energy
- Jupiter mass (M_{J}), a unit of mass

== Transportation ==
- Manufacturers' Junction Railway, near Cicero, Illinois, U.S., reporting mark MJ
- Líneas Aéreas Privadas Argentinas, a former Argentinian airline, IATA airline code MJ
- Jeep Comanche, designated MJ, a pickup truck
- MJ (New York City Subway service), a defunct subway service in New York City, US
- Maja railway station (station code), Lebak Regency, Banten, Indonesia
- Marwar Junction railway station (station code: MJ), Rajasthan, India

== Other uses ==
- The MJ, a short name for The Municipal Journal, a United Kingdom publication about local democracy and civic administration
- Maillot jaune or yellow jersey, worn by the leader of the Tour de France cycling stage race
- Master of Jurisprudence, a master's degree
- West's Military Justice Reporter (cited as M.J.), official reporter of the U.S. Court of Appeals for the Armed Forces
- Short for Mary Jane, slang for marijuana

== See also ==
- Emjay (born 1974), a Canadian Eurodance musician
- Ɱ, the letter M with hook
