= MLSE =

MLSE may refer to:

- Maple Leaf Sports & Entertainment, owner and operator of several Toronto-based sports teams
- Maximum likelihood sequence estimation, an algorithm
