= MDV =

MDV may refer to:

- Maldives, ISO 3166-1 alpha-3 country code
- MDV (TV station), Australian television station
- The IATA code for Omboué Hospital Airport in Gabon
- The IOC code for Maldives Olympic Committee
- Messa di voce, a singing and voice therapy technique
- MDV Commercial Air Conditioner, Midea Group brand (active since 1999)
- Mitteldeutscher Verkehrsverbund (MDV), Transport and Tariff Association in the German Leipzig-Halle area
- Marek's disease virus
