= MSD =

MSD may refer to:

== People ==
- Mahendra Singh Dhoni or MSD (born 1981), Indian cricketer

== Companies ==
- Merck Sharp and Dohme (MSD), an international name of Merck & Co., the U.S. and Canada pharmaceutical company formerly related to German Merck KGaA
- MSD Capital, a private investment firm owned by personal computer entrepreneur Michael Dell
- MSD Ignition, a company that specializes in automotive-ignition components; MSD stands for "multiple spark discharge"
- Motor Sports Developments, an automotive-engineering company based in Milton Keynes, United Kingdom; see X25XE

== Computers ==
- Mass storage device, like a USB key
- Memory Stick Duo, a type of solid digital data storage device
- Microsoft Diagnostics, a computer diagnostic program shipped with various versions of DOS and Microsoft Windows operating systems
- Modem Sharing Device
- MSD Super Disk, a floppy-disk drive for Commodore 8-bit systems
- miniSD/microSD

== Organizations ==
=== Schools and school districts ===
- Marjory Stoneman Douglas High School, Florida, United States
  - Stoneman Douglas High School shooting
- Marshall School District in Marshall, Arkansas, United States
- Maryland School for the Deaf, United States
- Milford School District, a school district in Milford, Delaware, United States
- Missouri School for the Deaf
- Moscow School District in Moscow, Idaho, United States

=== Other organizations ===
- Meclîsa Sûriya Demokratîk or Syrian Democratic Council, the political wing of the Syrian Democratic Forces in Syria
- Metro de Santo Domingo, a rapid-transit system in Santo Domingo, the capital of the Dominican Republic
- Ministry of Social Development (New Zealand)
- Mission Science Division, a group of scientists, research fellows and young graduates working at the European Space Agency
- Mladí sociální demokraté or Young Social Democrats (Czech Republic), a social democratic youth organization in the Czech Republic
- Mladí sociálni demokrati or Young Social Democrats (Slovakia), a social democratic youth organization in Slovakia
- Mobile Security Deployments, the U.S. Diplomatic Security Service's tactical unit
- MSD (Межправительственный совет дорожников) or Intergovernmental Council of Roads, the road authority organisation of the Commonwealth of Independent States

== Mathematics & Science ==
- Marine sanitation device, used in the Regulation of ship pollution in the United States#Marine sanitation devices
- Mars solar date
- Mass spectrometric detector, a type of chromatography detector
- Mean squared displacement, a statistical measure of random motion
- Mean signed deviation, a measure of statistical deviation

== Health & Life Sciences ==
- Multiple sulfatase deficiency, a very rare form of metachromatic leukodystrophy
- Musculoskeletal disorders
- Macromolecular Structure Database, one of the services provided by the European Bioinformatics Institute
- Major hypersomnolence disorder
- MSD Manual – Consumer Version, open-source medical reference, published by Merck

== Other uses ==
- Magnetic switchable device, a passive magnetic mount that can be activated or deactivated
- Master Scuba Diver, a certification level in recreational scuba diving
- Master of Science in Dentistry, a dental degree
- Master of Sport Directorship, at Manchester Metropolitan University
- Mean Shortest Distance, in the context of the PGP Web of trust
- Minimum string distance, the number of insertions, deletions, or substitutions to transform one string into another in minimum string distance error rate
- Station code for Moorside railway station, England
- Moscow Summer Time
- Most significant digit
- Postal code for Msida, Malta
- Masjid railway station (station code: MSD), Mumbai, India
