= MTOE =

MTOE is an acronym that may refer to:

- Million Tonnes of Oil Equivalent, a unit of energy
- Modification Table of Organization and Equipment, a U.S. Army term for the specified organization of military units.
