= MLL =

MLL may refer to:

- Major League Lacrosse
- Malua Bay language (ISO 639-3: mll), spoken in Malekula, Vanuatu
- Marshall Don Hunter Sr. Airport (IATA: MLL), in Marshall, Alaska
- Mayor Lori Lightfoot, mayor of Chicago
- Morel-Lavallée lesion
- An enzyme encoded by the KMT2A gene
