= MMS =

MMS may refer to:

== Science and technology ==
=== Network communication protocols ===
- Multimedia Messaging Service for mobile phones
- Microsoft Media Server, a content-streaming protocol (mms://)
- Manufacturing Message Specification for real time process data

=== Other ===
- Magnetospheric Multiscale Mission, NASA
- Massachusetts Medical Society
- Maximin share, a criterion of fair item allocation
- Methyl methanesulfonate
- Moment magnitude scale of earthquake energy
- Multiscale Modeling and Simulation journal

== Schools ==
- Modern Montessori School, Amman, Jordan
- Marshall Middle School (Pittsburgh), US
- Mayo Clinic School of Medicine, US, formerly Mayo Medical School
- Margaret Mace School, the only school of the North Wildwood School District

== Government and politics ==
- Minerals Management Service, former U.S. agency
- Movimento Mérito e Sociedade (Merit and Society Movement), Portuguese political party

== Other uses ==
- Machinist's mate (shop mechanic), US Navy
- Master of Management, a postgraduate academic degree course.
- Medical Mission Sisters, a religious congregation
- Methodist Missionary Society of Australasia, a former division of the Methodist Church in Australia
- Metro Manila Subway, an under-construction rapid transit line in Philippines
- Metropolitan mountaineering society, Philippines
- Miracle Mineral Supplement, bleach fraudulently sold as medicine
- Musical Masterpiece Society, former record production and distribution company
- M.M.S. (Mobile Missile System), a G.I. Joe playset
- MMS-class minesweeper, a class of British warships

== See also ==
- M&M's
