= MEF =

MEF may stand for:

== Government ==
- Ministry of Economy and Finance (Peru), the Peruvian ministry of economics and finance
- Ministry of Economy and Finance (Uruguay), the Uruguayan ministry of economics and finance
- Ministry of Economy and Finance (Italy), the Italian ministry of economics and finance
- Ministry of Environment and Forests, India
- Mission Essential Functions, critical operations of the US government in the face of unexpected disruption

== Military ==
- Malaita Eagle Force, a militant organization originating in the island of Malaita in the Solomon Islands
- Marine Expeditionary Force, one of the major deployable subdivisions of the United States Marine Corps
- Mediterranean Expeditionary Force
- Mesopotamian Expeditionary Force during the First World War

== Organizations ==
- Mahratta Education Fund, Indian non-profit organisation
- Major Economies Forum on Energy and Climate Change
- Media Education Foundation
- MEF International School Istanbul
- Middle East Forum, an American conservative think tank
- Mongolia Economic Forum, Mongolia

== Science/technology ==
- Managed Extensibility Framework, a software plugin framework, written by Microsoft
- Maximum Elevation Figure (flying)
- Maximal expiratory flow, another name for peak expiratory flow in spirometry
- Medial eye fields
- Metro Ethernet Forum
- Modernized e-File (MeF), an electronic system for filing U.S. income taxes
- Modified Energy Factor (Energy Star Rating Value, US Department of Energy (DOE))
- Mouse embryonic fibroblast
- Museo Paleontológico Egidio Feruglio collection code
- Mef2 (myocyte enhancer factor-2), a family of gene transcription factors
- Multiscale Electrophysiology Format, a data format used in electrophysiology

== Transport ==
- Mei Foo station, Hong Kong, MTR station code
