= Medal of Bravery =

The Medal of Bravery may refer to:

- Medal of Bravery (Canada)
- Medal of Bravery (Hungary)
- Medal of Bravery (Iraq)
- List of medals for bravery
