= MSLP =

MSLP may refer to:

- mean sea level pressure
- Cuscatlan International Airport (ICAO airport code MSLP)
- the degree of Master of Speech–Language Pathology
- the Mississippi branch of the Libertarian Party (United States)
- MusclePharm, a business
- Minority Student Leadership Program, a leadership development program of the American Speech–Language–Hearing Association

mSLP may refer to:

- Mesh-enhanced Service Location Protocol
