= MVR =

MVR or MvR may refer to:

== Codes ==
- Maldivian rufiyaa, Maldives currency by ISO 4217 code
- Salak Airport, Maroua, Far North Province, Cameroon
- Marau language of Indonesian Papua, ISO 639-3 code
- IBM RPG II programming language "Move Remainder" operation code

== Organizations ==
- Fifth Republic Movement (Spanish: Movimiento V [Quinta] República), a Venezuelan political party
- Transports Montreux–Vevey–Riviera, a Swiss railway operator

== Science and technology ==
- Mechanical vapor recompression, an energy recovery process;
- Melt Volume(-flow) Rate, a measure of the ease of flow of the melt of a thermoplastic polymer.

== Transportation ==
- Meon Valley Railway, cross-country railway 1903–1968, Hampshire, England
- Moors Valley Railway
- Mary Valley Rattler, a heritage railway line conducting steam train tours from Gympie to Amamoor (formerly Imbil).

== Miscellaneous ==
- Market Value Reduction, used by insurance companies
- Mound Visits Remaining, in baseball
