= MMI =

MMI may refer to:

== Science and technology ==
- Man-machine interface or user interface
- GSM Man-Machine Interface, a mobile telephony standard, see Unstructured Supplementary Service Data § Man-Machine Interface
- Modified Mercalli intensity scale, an earthquake intensity measure
- W3C MMI or Multimodal Interaction Activity
- Monolithic Memories, Inc. (1969–1987), an American semiconductor manufacturer
- Motorola Mobility (NYSE: MMI), a publicly traded electronics company, formerly part of Motorola
- Multi Media Interface, an in-car interface system developed by Audi
- Maximum mutual information criterion
- Methimazole, a drug used to treat hyperthyroidism
- Multi mode interferometer
- Modified Mecalli Index

== Music ==
- Miss May I, a metalcore band from Ohio
- Madurai Mani Iyer, Indian singer

== Schools ==
- Marion Military Institute, a military junior college in Marion, Alabama
- Marymount International School of Rome, a private Catholic school in Rome, Italy
- Miami Military Institute, a former military college that was located in Germantown, Ohio
- Millersburg Military Institute, a defunct military school in Kentucky
- MMI Preparatory School, a college preparatory school in Freeland, Pennsylvania
- Motorcycle Mechanics Institute, a program of the Universal Technical Institute

== Other uses ==
- 2001 (year)
- 2001 or MMI in Roman numerals
- Manufacturers Mutual Insurance, a former Australian insurance company, now called Allianz Australia
- Municipal Mutual Insurance, a British insurance company
- Maximum medical improvement, a plateau in a person's healing process
- McMinn County Airport's identification code
- Multiple mini interview, an interview method to assess soft skills
- Muslim Mosque, Inc., an organization founded by Malcolm X
- NYSE Arca Major Market Index

== See also ==
- 2001 (disambiguation)
