= MAFF =

MAFF(S) may refer to:

- MAFF (gene), a transcription factor
- Malmö Arab Film Festival, held in Malmö (Sweden), the largest Arabic film festival in Europe
- Ministry of Agriculture, Fisheries and Food (United Kingdom), a former British government department
- Ministry of Agriculture, Forestry and Fisheries, Cambodia
- Ministry of Agriculture, Forestry and Fisheries (Japan)
- Modular Airborne FireFighting System wildland firefighting system installable on large aircraft
- Mozilla Archive Format, a web page archiving format provided by Firefox through an extension
