= Moz =

Moz or MOZ may refer to:

== Places ==
- Moz, Kalbajar, a village in Azerbaijan
- Porto de Moz, a municipality in Pará, Brazil
- Mozambique, country code MOZ

== People ==
- Maurice (given name), as a nickname
- Morris (given name), as a nickname
- Nickname given to English musician Morrissey (born 1959)

== Entertainment ==
- Moz, a character in the 2017's John Lewis Christmas advert
- Moz, a musical project of American musician/composer James Brand

== Other ==
- Märkische Oderzeitung (MOZ), a German daily newspaper
- Moorea Airport (IATA code: MOZ), in Moorea, French Polynesia
- Moz (p-Methoxybenzyl carbonyl), an amine protecting group
