= MYT =

MYT may refer to:

- Codes coordinated for uniqueness within context of application and region:
  - Mayotte (ISO 3166 country code)
  - Malaysia Time (zone)
  - Transportation systems:
    - Aviation (international):
      - MyTravel Airways (British airline; former ICAO code)
      - (IATA code) airport in Myanmar (Myitkyina)
    - Rail:
      - Amtrak station in California (Monterey)
      - National Rail station code Mytholmroyd railway station, England,
- Youth organizations:
  - Middlesbrough Youth Theatre,
  - Milwaukee Youth Theatre,
- MYT, type of swing-piston engine
