= MSI =

MSI may refer to:

== Organizations ==
- Macedonian Scientific Institute, an institution in Sofia, Bulgaria
- Marketing Science Institute, a nonprofit learning institution in Cambridge, Massachusetts, US
- Media Sport Investment, the international fund of investors that ran Sport Club Corinthians Paulista
- Millennium Science Initiative, an international program bringing technology to developing nations
- Ministry of Science and Innovation (New Zealand)
- Minority-serving institution, in US higher education
- MSI Reproductive Choices, an international non-governmental organisation providing contraception and safe abortion services, with a global HQ in London, UK
- Museum of Science and Industry (Chicago), US
- Science and Industry Museum, in Manchester, England
- University of Minnesota Supercomputing Institute
- Italian Social Movement (Movimento Sociale Italiano), a defunct post-fascist party

=== Companies ===
- Micro-Star International, a Taiwanese information technology company
- Midwest Scientific Instruments, a defunct American computer company
- Morgan Stanley (Broker ID), an American financial services company
- Motorola Solutions (NYSE: MSI), an American data communications and telecommunications equipment provider
- Movie Star (company) (AMEX: MSI), an American clothing manufacturer

== Science and technology ==
- MSI Barcode, a continuous numeric barcode symbology
- Microsatellite instability, an abnormality of DNA
- Mass spectrometry imaging, a technique used in mass spectrometry
- Mass sociogenic illness, the rapid spread of physical symptoms of illness among the members of a group with no physical or infectious cause
- Magnetic source imaging, magnetoencephalography combined with magnetic resonance imaging
- Multispectral imaging, the capture of multiple, specific wavelengths in the electromagnetic spectrum
- Musculoskeletal injury, damage of muscular or skeletal systems which is usually due to a strenuous activity

=== Computing ===
- .MSI, the filename extension of Windows Installer packages
- Medium scale integration, a generation of integrated circuit chips which contain hundreds of transistors
- Message Signaled Interrupts, a PCI 2.2 interrupt-mechanism
- MSI protocol, a basic cache-coherence protocol used in multiprocessor systems

== Other uses ==
- Maison du Sport International, an office complex in Lausanne, Switzerland
- Maritime safety information, emergency signal communication
- Medical Service Insurance, the Government of Nova Scotia's health insurance
- Mid-Season Invitational, an annual League of Legends tournament
- Mindless Self Indulgence, an American rock band
- Multistakeholder initiative, a governance structure
- Inshore minesweeper (US Navy hull classification symbol: MSI), See List of mine warfare vessels of the United States Navy
- Meaningful Social Interactions, a term mentioned in the 2021 Facebook leak
