= MCM =

MCM may refer to:

== Measurements ==
- Thousand circular mils or kcmil, the wire gauge is equivalent cross sectional area (500 MCM = 500,000 circular mils)
- Million cubic metre, the unit of volume

== Music ==
- Magic Circle Music, a heavy metal record label
- Magic City Misfits, a roller derby team from Jacksonville, FL
- Maverick City Music, a contemporary christian group
- MCM (TV channel), a French music channel
- Music City Mystique, a Percussion Independent World (PIW) Drumline
- The Mad Capsule Markets, a Japanese punk-metal band
- MCM – The Gospel: The Missing Gems of MCM Caveman (1994-2011) (Mark Layman), rapper and former frontman for UK hip-hop group Caveman
- MCM Records, a French record label established by Jacques and Marcelle Morgantini
- Melbourne Conservatorium of Music, the Faculty of Music (under the Faculty of Fine Art and Music, FFAM) at the University of Melbourne

== Science ==
- Medical countermeasure (MCM), products that can protect from the effects of a chemical, biological, or nuclear attack
- Minichromosome maintenance protein, which forms DNA helicase in eukaryotic species
- Mobil Composition of Matter or Mobil Crystalline Material, a family of porous silicate-based materials
- Macrocephaly-capillary malformation (M-CM), a rare genetic syndrome
- Methylmalonyl-coenzyme A mutase, an enzyme
- the Monte Carlo method

== Military ==
- MCM pistol, a 25-meter Standard Pistol
- Mine Counter-measures, defensive techniques against military mines
- Manual for Courts-Martial, the official guide to the conduct of courts-martial in the United States
- Marine Corps Marathon, a 26-mile marathon held in Arlington, VA and Washington, DC
- A US Navy hull classification symbol: Mine countermeasures ship (MCM)

== Technology ==
- Micro Computer Machines, an early manufacturer of microcomputers, such as the MCM/70
- Microsoft Certified Master
- Mobile content management, software capable of storing and delivering content to mobile devices
- Multi Carrier Modulation
- Multi-chip module, a specialized electronic package

== Transportation ==
- Monaco Heliport's IATA code
- PABCO Transit, Inc or Morris County Metro, a bus system formerly serving Morris County, New Jersey

== Other ==
- Maranatha Campus Ministries, a former Christian ministry in the U.S.
- Mathematical Contest in Modeling, challenges teams of students to clarify, analyze, and propose solutions to open-ended problems
- M-C-M', Money-Commodity-Money, one of the forms of commodity trade in the theory of Karl Marx
- MCM London Comic Con, a multi-genre fan convention held in London
- MCM Worldwide, leather luxury goods brand
- Melbourne City Mission, a charity in Australia
- Mid-Century modern, an architectural, interior and product design form
- Mighty Car Mods, a YouTube show about modifying cars
- Roman numeral for 1900

- by extension the 20th century

- Montreal Citizens' Movement, a municipal political party in Montreal, Quebec, Canada
