= MILF (disambiguation) =

MILF is most commonly used as an acronym that stands for "Mother I'd Like to Fuck".

MILF may also refer to:

- MILF (2010 film), an American sex comedy film by The Asylum
- MILF (2018 film), a French comedy film directed by Axelle Laffont
- MILF pornography, a pornographic genre
- "M.I.L.F. $", a 2016 song by Fergie
- Moro Islamic Liberation Front, a militant Islamist group operating in the southern Philippines
- "Milf", a song by Big Sean from the album Hall of Fame (2013)
