= MNG =

MNG may refer to:

== Places ==
- Maningrida Airport, Northern Territory, Australia, IATA airport code
- Manningtree railway station, Essex, England, station code
- Mongolia, see ISO 3166-1 and List of FIFA country codes
- Montgomery station (West Virginia), U.S., Amtrak station code

== Biology and medicine ==
- Methylnitronitrosoguanidine, a mutagen
- Midline nuclear group, a region of the thalamus in the vertebrate brain

== Organisations ==
- MNG Maritime, floating armoury company
- MNG Group of Companies
  - MNG Airlines, a Turkish cargo airline
- MNG Enterprises, an American newspaper & media company
- Mocidade Nacionalista Galega or Galician Nationalist Youth, a political youth organization in Galicia, Spain

== Other ==
- Mnong language (ISO 639:mng)
- Multiple-image Network Graphics, a graphics file format
- Meet and greet
