= MLR =

MLR may refer to:

== People ==
- Mary Lynn Rajskub, actress

== Places ==
- MLR Institute of Technology
- Mar-Lu-Ridge Summer Camp and Education and Conference Center
- Milnrow railway station, England, UK; National Rail station code MLR

== Finance ==
- Medical Loss Ratio, in health insurance
- Minimum lending rate
- Monotone likelihood ratio
- Money laundering regulations

== Literature ==
- Michigan Law Review
- Minnesota Law Review
- Modern Language Review
- Modern Law Review
- Monthly Labor Review, a monthly journal published by the U.S. Bureau of Labor Statistics

== Science and technology ==
- Multiple linear regression – see Linear regression
- Morse/Long-range potential
- Machine-learned ranking
- Machine Learning Runtime, a machine learning environment in Databricks (software)
- Mineralocorticoid receptor
- Mixed lymphocyte reaction
- Mesencephalic locomotor region, a region in the brainstem comprising the pedunculopontine nucleus, the cuneiform nucleus and the subcuneiform nucleus

== Organizations ==
- Major League Rugby, the professional rugby union competition of North America.
- Ministry of Land and Resources

== Transport ==
- Metro Light Rail, the light rail in Sydney (2000–2012)
- Valley Metro Rail, the light rail network in Phoenix, Arizona
- Mid-life Refurbishment, another term for MTR MLR Train EMU

== Weapons and military ==
- Main Line of Resistance
- Muzzle-loading rifle
- Multiple rocket launcher
- Marine Littoral Regiment

== Other ==
- Montana Land Reliance
- Metadata for learning resources or ISO/IEC 19788, a standard to describe learning resources
