= MOW =

MOW may refer to:

- Mercer Oliver Wyman, now part of Oliver Wyman, a management consulting firm
- Movie of the Week, a television movie
- The Mobility and Public Works policy area of the Flemish Government
- Maintenance of way, the maintenance of railroad right of way
- March on Washington, a mass political action
- Memory of the World Programme, a UNESCO initiative
- Ministry of Works, a former New Zealand government department
- Movement for the Ordination of Women, an Australian movement supporting the ordination of women in the Anglican Church of Australia
- Museum de Oude Wolden, a regional art museum in Bellingwolde in the Netherlands

It is also the IATA designation of Moscow area airports:

- Sheremetyevo International Airport
- Domodedovo International Airport
- Vnukovo International Airport
- Zhukovsky International Airport
