= MOF =

MOF may refer to:

== Science and technology ==
- Metal–organic framework, a chemical compound formed of metal ions and organic chemical components
- Multiple organ failure or multiple organ dysfunction syndrome, a medical condition

=== Computing ===
- Managed Object Format, a textual representation of the Distributed Management Task Force Common Information Model
- Meta-Object Facility, a meta-model used to formally define Unified Modeling Language
- Microsoft Operations Framework, a set of operational guidelines based on ITIL

== Other uses ==
- Meilleur Ouvrier de France ("Best Worker of France"), a French competition for artisanal mastery
- Mountain of Faith, the tenth game in the Touhou series of shoot 'em up games
- Monsters of Folk, an American folk group
- Mof, a Dutch slur in the list of terms used for Germans
- Frans Xavier Seda Airport (IATA airport code: MOF), on the island of Flores, Indonesia
- Museum of Flight, air and space museum in Seattle, US
