= MLE =

MLE may refer to:

== Organizations ==
- Institute for Management and Leadership in Education, advanced studies in education at the Harvard Graduate School of Education
- Media Lab Europe, former lab in Dublin, Ireland
- Major League Eating, competitive eating organization
- Marxistisk-Leninistisk Enhedsforbund, a Danish Maoist group 1972–1975
- Military Liaison Element anti-terrorist special forces in US embassies
- Mister Leather Europe, European leather subculture event

== Science and technology ==
- Magister Legum Europeae, university degree, granted by the Faculty of Law of Gottfried Wilhelm Leibniz University Hanover
- Mars Lander Engine of Mars Science Laboratory
- Multilamellar emulsion, in dermatology
- Maximum likelihood estimation, in statistics
- Managed learning environment, in e-learning
- Muconate lactonizing enzyme, in molecular biology
- Magazine Lee–Enfield, a rifle
- Maleless protein, involved in Dosage compensation in Drosophila, in genetics
- An error in Competitive programming meaning Memory Limit Exceeded.
- Machine learning engineer, a software engineer who specializes in machine learning

== Other uses ==
- Magister Legum Europae, i.e. Master of European Law, a European master's degree in the field of European law
- Multicultural London English, in linguistics
- Velana International Airport, Malé, IATA code
- Mid-Level Exception, an NBA salary cap exception
- Model Law Engineer, a professional designation in the United States
- ml℮, a label of estimated volume (in millilitres)
