= MKT =

MKT may refer to:

- M. K. Thyagaraja Bhagavathar, an Indian actor
- Minkuotang, a political party in Taiwan
- Lincoln MKT, a car
- Mario Kart Tour, a 2019 mobile game
- Mortal Kombat Trilogy, a 1996 video game

== Transport ==
- Mankato Regional Airport, IATA and FAA codes
- Marks Tey railway station, National Rail station code
- Missouri–Kansas–Texas Railroad, a defunct United States railroad
  - MKT Trail, in the railroad's right-of-way
- Emkaytee Airfield, Australia

== Science and technology ==
- Mean kinetic temperature
- Mathematische Keilschrift-Texte, 1935 texts by Otto E. Neugebauer
