= MAF =

MAF may refer to:

== Military ==
- Mongolian Air Force
- Mongolian Armed Forces
- Myanmar Air Force
- Malaysian Armed Forces
- Marine Amphibious Force, a former name for Marine Expeditionary Force, a type of U.S. Marine Corps task force

== Organizations ==
- Majid Al Futtaim Group
- Move America Forward
- Mission Aviation Fellowship

== Science ==
- MAF (gene)
- Minor allele frequency, in genetics
- Methoxyacetylfentanyl, an opioid analgesic
- Macrophage-activating factor
- Moisture and Ash Free, a measure of moisture and ash content as used in ranking coals or the heat-content of wood
- Million acre-foot, MAF, a unit of volume commonly used in the United States in reference to large-scale water resources

== Sports ==
- Malaysia Athletics Federation
- Metin-Ali-Feyyaz, Turkish football trio who constituted attacking line of Turkish sports club Beşiktaş J.K.
- Marc-André Fleury (born 1984), Canadian former ice hockey goaltender in the National Hockey League

== Technology ==
- Mass airflow sensor, used to find the mass flowrate of air entering a fuel-injected internal combustion engine
- MAFless Tuning, a method of operating the fuel injection system on a gasoline-powered motor vehicle whereby the mass airflow meter is removed
- Markranstädter Automobilfabrik, a German car-brand built from 1909 to 1923 in Markranstädt
- Mozilla Archive Format, a format for archiving web pages and also an add-on of the same name for Mozilla Firefox
- Magnetic field-assisted finishing
- Microsoft Access Form, a file format associated with Microsoft Access, bearing the file extension .maf

== Other ==
- New Zealand Ministry of Agriculture and Forestry
- Saint Martin (France), ISO 3166-1 alpha-3 country code
- Midland International Airport, whose IATA code is MAF
- Michoud Assembly Facility, a NASA manufacturing facility 14 miles outside New Orleans, Louisiana
