= Main support battalion =

A Main Support Battalion (MSB) was a US Army logistics formation in the "Army of Excellence" period. The role of the MSB was to support soldiers in the division rear and provide designated reinforcing support to the forward support battalions. The MSBs were converted to serve as the Brigade Support Battalion for the 4th Brigade Combat teams activated as part of the Modularity transformation after 2004.

== Organization ==
One MSB was organic to each Division Support Command. The MSB comprised:

- Headquarters and Headquarters Detachment
- Supply and Service Company
- Transportation Motor Transport Company
- Heavy Maintenance Company
- Electronic Maintenance Company
- Medical Company

== See also ==
- Divisional Support Command
