= Hungarian Electronic Library =

The Hungarian Electronic Library (Hungarian: Magyar Elektronikus Könyvtár) is one of the most significant text-archives of the Hungarian Web space showcasing a variety of primary and secondary sources. Contains thousands of full-text works in the humanities and social sciences. Topics covered include science, math, technology, arts, and literature. Most texts are in Hungarian, though some have been translated into English.
