= Manufacturer's Certificate of Origin =

A Manufacturer's Certificate of Origin (MCO), also known as a Manufacturer's Statement of Origin (MSO), is a specified document certifying the country of origin of the merchandise required by certain foreign countries for tariff purposes. It sometimes requires the signature of the consulate of the country to which it is destined.

A certificate of origin is employed to certify that a good being exported either from the United States into Canada or Mexico or from Canada or Mexico into the United States qualifies as an originating good for purposes of preferential tariff treatment under the North American Free Trade Agreement (NAFTA).

== Kit vehicles ==
The MCO will specifically state that the vehicle is a glider kit or a kit vehicle. If the applicant does not have an MCO, the vehicle must be titled and registered as a reconstructed vehicle.

== See also ==
- Bill of sale
- Certificate of title
- Financing statement
- Vehicle identification number (VIN)
