= Montreal Student Space Associations =

Group of student aerospace associations

- Formation: July 2017; 7 years ago
- Type: Non-profit organization
- Location: Montreal, QC, Canada
- Parent organization: Canadian Space Society
- Website: www.montrealspace.ca

The Montreal Student Space Associations (MSSA; French: Associations Etudiantes Spatiales de Montreal) are a group of student aerospace associations across Quebec universities.

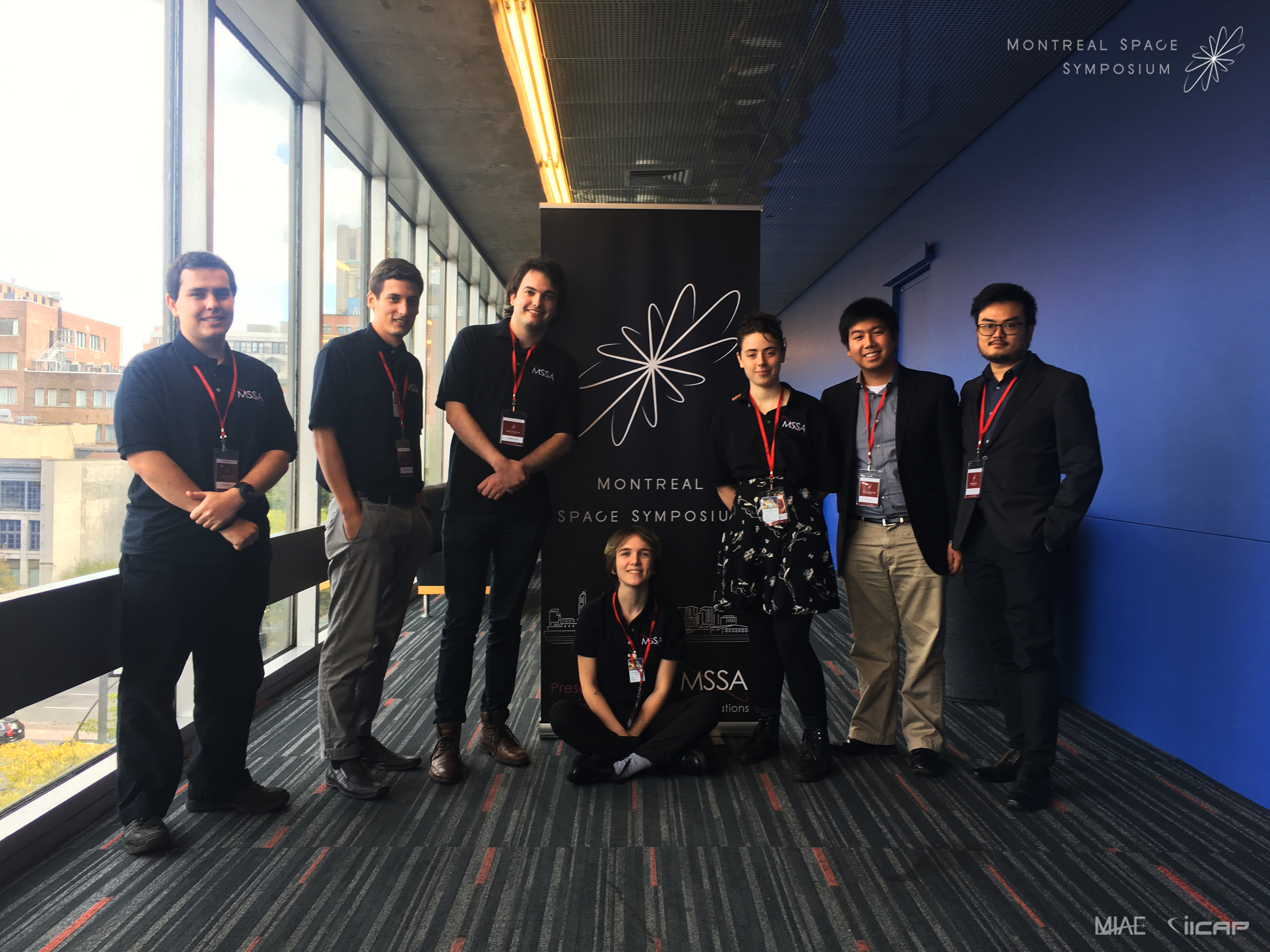
The organizing committee of the first Montreal Space Symposium

== History ==
In July 2017, a committee of students from Concordia and McGill Universities united under the common goal of promoting space related discussions and awareness to the public through a conference taking place during World Space Week: the Montreal Space Symposium (MSS). Following this collaborative effort, other schools and teams across Montreal joined the committee, and formed together the Montreal Student Space Associations.

The first conference being a success, the group formalized its existence by becoming the Montreal chapter of the Canadian Space Society, and pursuing its outreach effort throughout the rest of the year. The mandate of the MSSA is threefold:

- To advocate for the role of students and student-led initiatives within the Canadian space sector;
- To showcase the opportunities existing in the space sector, and empower the youth to engage in space related activities leading to careers in the field;
- To enhance the space community in Montreal, in order to foster the city to become a widely recognized space hub.

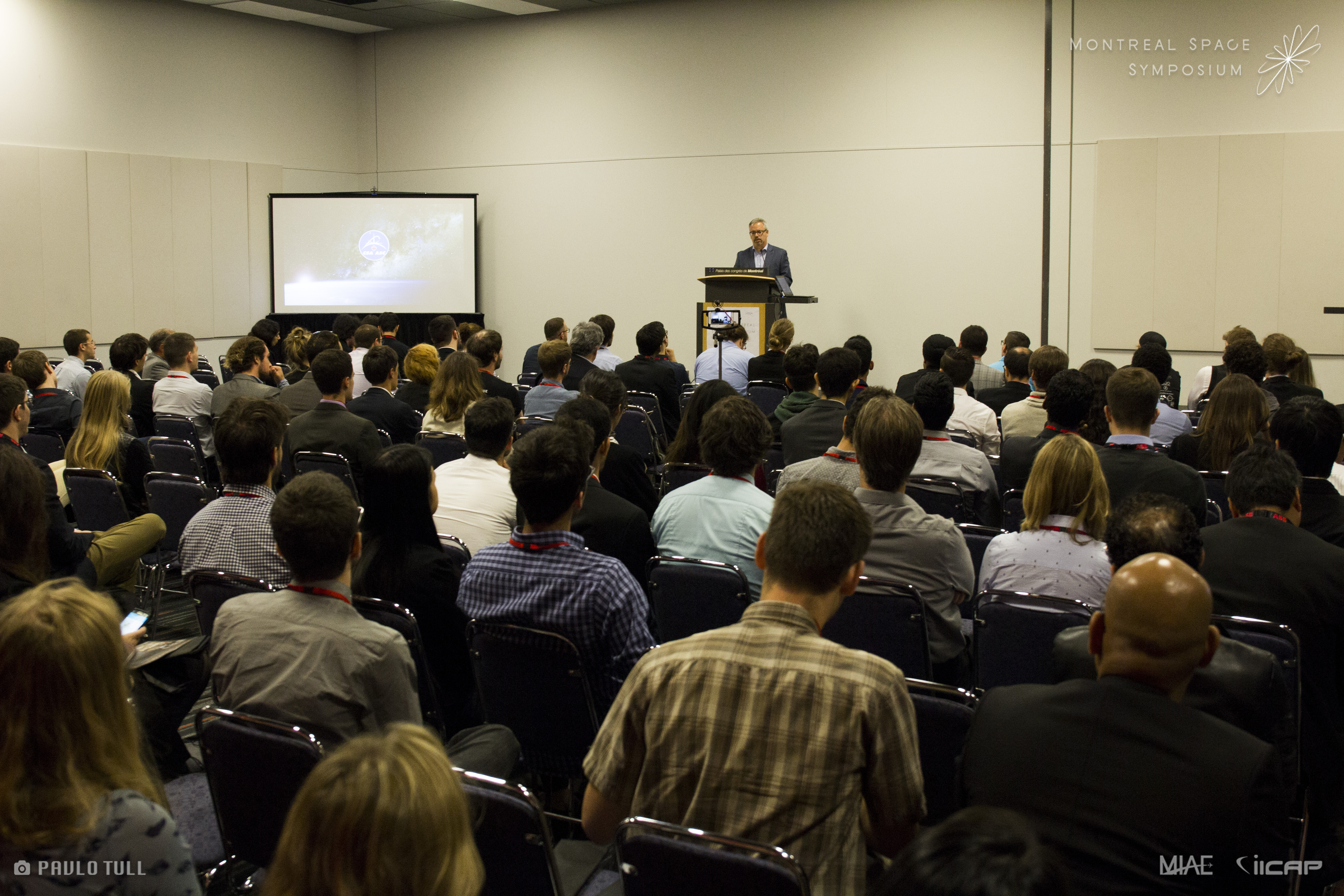
Sylvain Laporte presenting at the MSS

== Composition ==
Concordia University:

- Space Concordia
- Concordia Institute for Aerospace Design and Innovation (CIADI)

McGill University:

- McGill Rocket Team
- McGill Space Institute
- McGill Space Group
- McGill Institute for Air and Space Law
- McGill Institute for Aerospace Engineering (MIAE)

École Polytechnique de Montréal:

- PolyOrbite
- AstroPoly
- Institut d'Innovation et de Conception en Aerospatiale de Polytechique (IICAP)

École de Technologie Supérieure:

- AÉROÉTS
- RockÉTS

Université de Sherbrooke:

- QMSat
