= MRT =

MRT may refer to:

== Transport ==
=== Rapid Transit Systems ===
- Mass Rapid Transit (disambiguation)
- Mass Rapid Transit (Singapore) or Mass Rapid Transit, Singapore
- Malaysia Rapid Transit Corporation
- MRT Jakarta (Jakarta Indonesia)
- MRT (Bangkok) or Metropolitan Rapid Transit, Thailand
- Manila Metro Rail Transit System, Philippines
- Taipei MRT, Taiwan
- Taoyuan MRT, Taiwan

=== Others ===
- Moreton (Merseyside) railway station, England, code MRT
- Moroak Airport (ICAO code: MRT), see List of airports by IATA airport code: M

== Computing ==
- Multiple Render Targets, in computer graphics
- mrt.exe, Windows Malicious Software Removal Tool
- Ferranti MRT (Market Research Terminal), a handheld computer

== Geography ==
- Mauritania, ISO 3166-1 alpha-3 country code
- Martinique, ITU country code
- Mississippi River Trail, US

== Science ==
- Mitochondrial replacement therapy
- Magnetic resonance tomography, also known as Magnetic Resonance Imaging
- Malignant rhabdoid tumour
- Mauritius Radio Telescope
- Mean radiant temperature, a measure of thermal comfort
- Mean residence time of matter in a volume
- Moral reconation therapy

== Other uses ==
- Macedonian Radio Television
- Manor Racing team in Formula One
- Marginal rate of transformation, in economics
- Merrimack Repertory Theatre, a non-profit professional theatre in Lowell, Massachusetts
- Tupamaro (Venezuela), a Marxist group
- Midland Reporter-Telegram, a daily newspaper in Midland, Texas
- Miyazaki Broadcasting, a radio and television broadcaster in Miyazaki Prefecture, Japan
- Mountain Rescue Teams, a name for some independent volunteer rescue teams in England and Wales

== See also ==
- Mississippi River and Tributaries Project (MR&T), US
- Mr. T, an American actor
- MTR, or Mass Transit Railway, Hong Kong
