= MS222 =

MS222 or variant, may refer to:

- Tricaine mesylate (MS-222) anesthetic
- Morane-Saulnier MS.222 airplane
- Simon master MS 222 manuscript
- Minuscule 222 (MS222), A404, a Greek minuscule manuscript of the New Testament

== See also ==
- MS-2 (disambiguation)
- MS 22 (disambiguation)
