= MS-200 =

MS-200 or variation, may refer to:

- Club of Four MS200, a medium duty truck
- Handley Page MS/200, a seaplane variant of the biplane Handley Page Type L
- Mirapoint MS200, a mail switch; see Mirapoint Email Appliance
- Morane-Saulnier MS.200, an airplane
- Motorola MS200, a clamshell CDMA cellphone; see List of Motorola products

== See also ==
- Pomonok School & STAR Academy (MS/PS200, Public School 200) in Kew Gardens Hills, Queens, New York City, New York State, USA
- Manuscript 200 (MS 200)
  - Stefan Zweig Collection MS 200, a manuscript by Martin Luther
  - Harley MS 200, a manuscript in the British Library written by Robert of Avesbury
  - Lambeth Palace Library MS 200, see List of illuminated later Anglo-Saxon manuscripts
- MS 2000 (disambiguation)
- MS20 (disambiguation)
- MS2 (disambiguation)
- MS (disambiguation)
- 200
