= SOTM =

SOTM may refer to:

== Entertainment ==
- Secrets of the Moon, a black metal band from Osnabrück, Germany.
- Sentinels of the Multiverse, a cooperative card game.
- Sentinels of the Multiverse: The Video Game, a video game based on the previous card game.
- "SOTM", a 2014 song by Teebs off the album Estara

== Transportation ==
- Satcom On The Move (SotM), the ability for a vehicle to maintain a satellite communication while moving
- Solosche Tramweg Maatschappij (SoTM), a rail company; see List of railway companies in the Dutch East Indies

== Other uses ==
- State of the Map, a kind of regular event organised by OpenStreetMap contributors around the world.
- State of the Municipality address, a version of the State of the City address, a speech by the mayor or city manager about the condition of the municipality

== See also ==
- STM (disambiguation)
- som (disambiguation)
- SM (disambiguation)
