= MS 2000 =

MS 2000 or variation, may refer to:

- Korg MS2000, music synthesizer
- General Motors MS2000, an automotive platform, variant of the GM W platform
- MOSAID MS2000, a computer memory tester

== See also ==
- Microsoft Windows Me (Millennium Edition), aka MS 2000; an operating system
- Microsoft Windows 2000, aka MS 2000; an operating system
- Microsoft Office 2000, aka MS 2000; an office productivity software package
- MS2 (disambiguation)
- MS20 (disambiguation)
- MS-200 (disambiguation)
- 2000 (disambiguation)
- MS (disambiguation)
