= MS2 =

MS2 or MS-2 may refer to:

== Science and technology ==
- Bacteriophage MS2
- Metre per second squared (ms^{−2}; m/s²), a unit of acceleration
- Lockheed Martin Maritime Systems & Sensors
- Tandem mass spectrometry (MS²)
- MegaSquirt2, a type of MegaSquirt electronic fuel injection controller
- ms2, an open source molecular simulation software

== Transport ==
- Mighty Servant 2, a heavy-lift ship
- Mississippi Highway 2
- Progress MS-02, a spacecraft
- Soyuz MS-02, a spacecraft
- Southern Railway (U.S.) Class Ms-2, a locomotive

== Video games ==
- MapleStory 2
- Mass Effect 2
- Metal Slug 2

== Other uses ==
- Mississippi's 2nd congressional district
- Project MS-2, a con perpetrated in 2002

== See also ==
- MS-II, a proposed rocket stage
- MS 2000 (disambiguation)
- MS20 (disambiguation)
- MS 22 (disambiguation)
- MSMS (disambiguation)
- MSS (disambiguation)
- MS (disambiguation)
- 2 (disambiguation)
