= MS20 =

MS20 or variation, may refer to:

- Korg MS-20, a music synthesizer
- Mississippi Highway 20 (MS 20)
- Mordaunt-Short MS20, a loudspeaker
- Murashige and Skoog medium MS20, a plant growth medium
- Soyuz MS-20, a space tourism mission

== See also ==
- Manuscript 20 (MS 20)
  - Huntington MS 20
  - Genealogies from Jesus College MS 20
- MS 2000 (disambiguation)
- MS-200 (disambiguation)
- MS2 (disambiguation)
- 20 (disambiguation)
- MS (disambiguation)
