= S&M (disambiguation) =

S&M, or sadomasochism, is the enjoyment of inflicting or receiving pain.

S&M may also refer to:

- S&M (album), a 1999 live album by Metallica
  - S&M2, a 2020 follow-up live album
- "S&M" (song), a 2010 song by Rihanna
- S&M, a 2001 album by Le Shok
- "S&M", a 1979 song by Thin Lizzy from Black Rose: A Rock Legend
- "S and M", a 1988 song by 2 Live Crew from Move Somethin'
- Sam & Max, a comic series and media franchise
- Serbia and Montenegro, a former country

== See also ==
- BDSM, a wider term encompassing both S&M and other forms of activity
- SM (disambiguation)
- M&S (disambiguation)
