= Club of Four =

Alliance of truck makers

The Club of Four was an alliance of four European truck manufacturers: Saviem, Volvo, DAF, and Magirus-Deutz.

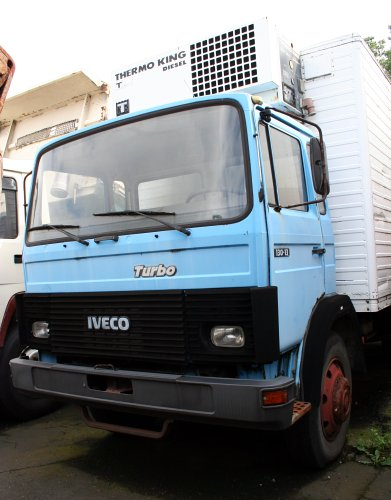
An Iveco with a Club of Four cab

Officially called the Société Européenne de Travaux et de Développement (ETD), the team was based in Paris. Founded to develop a shared range of light trucks, its main success was a shared cab design. Cabs can be one of the most expensive parts of a truck to design and build; the alliance allowed one cab design to be shared among four different truck manufacturers, allowing economies of scale. In 1978, Saviem was merged with Berliet to create Renault Véhicules Industriels (RVI), but the new company continued as a member of the Club. Magirus became later part of Iveco.

The cab was used on a wide range of different trucks. It was even used on Mack trucks in the USA. It remained in production for almost a quarter of a century. Although initially intended for medium trucks it was also used on light trucks, even the 6-tonne Magirus-Deutz 90M6FK.

== Development ==
The creation of a completely new cab design was tasked to Renault Centre de Style to submit proposals.The cabin not only had to be modern in design, but also had to be able to be tilted. Initially there was also the idea of building the models of the four participating brands in one factory, but this was abandoned at an early stage.

Mock up scale models were utilized during the development of the cab. Two models where chosen which featured the same basic cabin, but one for lighter payload and a second for a higher payload. Changes made to the final production version included the addition of an extra window behind the doors, beams on the front and side and the repositioning of the direction indicators to the corners of the cab. The shape of the front mudguards was also changed from angular to round.

== Cab design usage ==
=== Volvo ===
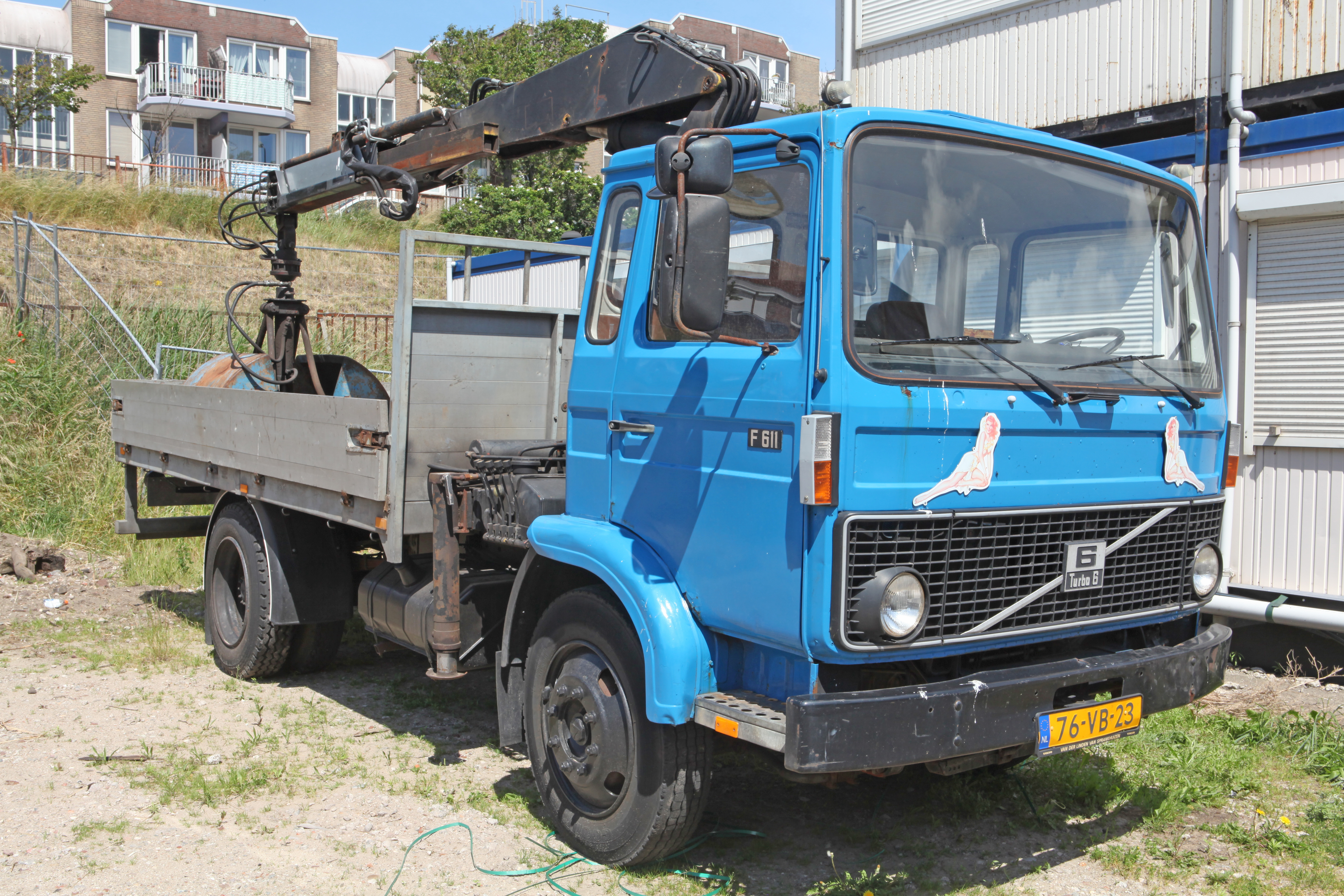
1980 Volvo F611

At first, Volvo used the cab most; adopting it across the F4 (F406/F407/F408) and F6 (F609/F610/F611/F612/F613/F614) ranges of trucks. The first to be sold in the UK was the F7 range of trucks, which replaced Volvo's old F86. These Club of Four cabs continued until 1985/1986 by which time the Volvo FL was being produced with new Volvo cabs, although the new FL6 was superficially similar to the Club of Four.

Volvo's Club of Four cabs had to be reinforced to meet strict Swedish safety standards, which made their weight less competitive. The Club of Four cab was also used on the CH230, a series of specially built narrow-bodied, larger engined truck to fit Switzerland's restrictive rules on size and weight. The first CH230 used the Club of Four cab atop the F89 chassis, with the narrower F86 front axle and the N10 rear axle. It was introduced in 1977. In 1980 the next iteration appeared, now using the F7 cab atop the F10/F12's chassis. It continued in production until 1986, when it was replaced by the FS10.

Volvo's membership of the Club of Four was a major influence on its decision to shift truck manufacturing to Gent, in Belgium (because imports from Volvo's Gothenburg factory to the EEC were, at that time, subject to heavy import duties).

=== Saviem and Berliet (later Renault) ===
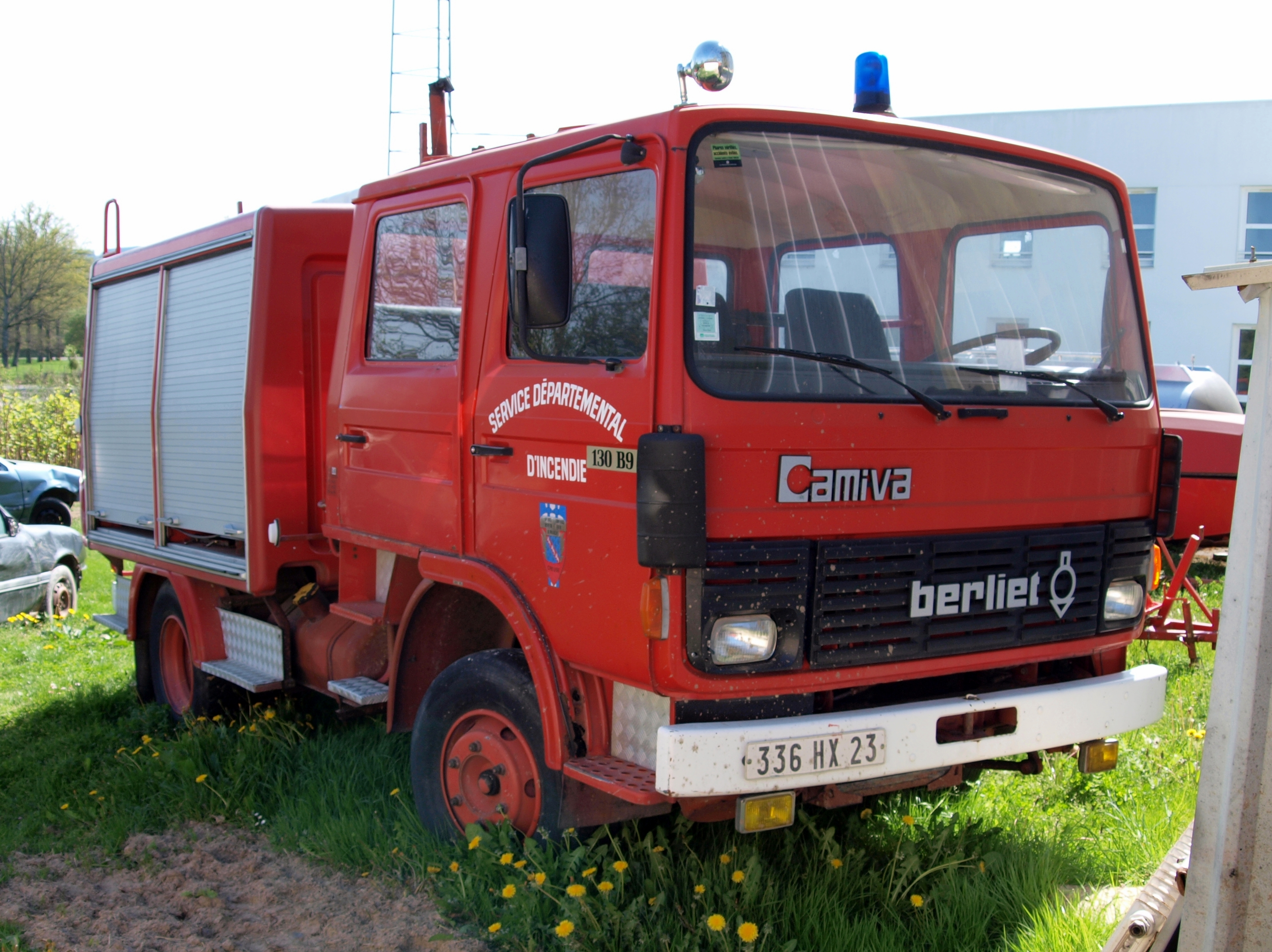
CAMIVA fire engine on Berliet 130 B9 chassis with a lengthened cabin

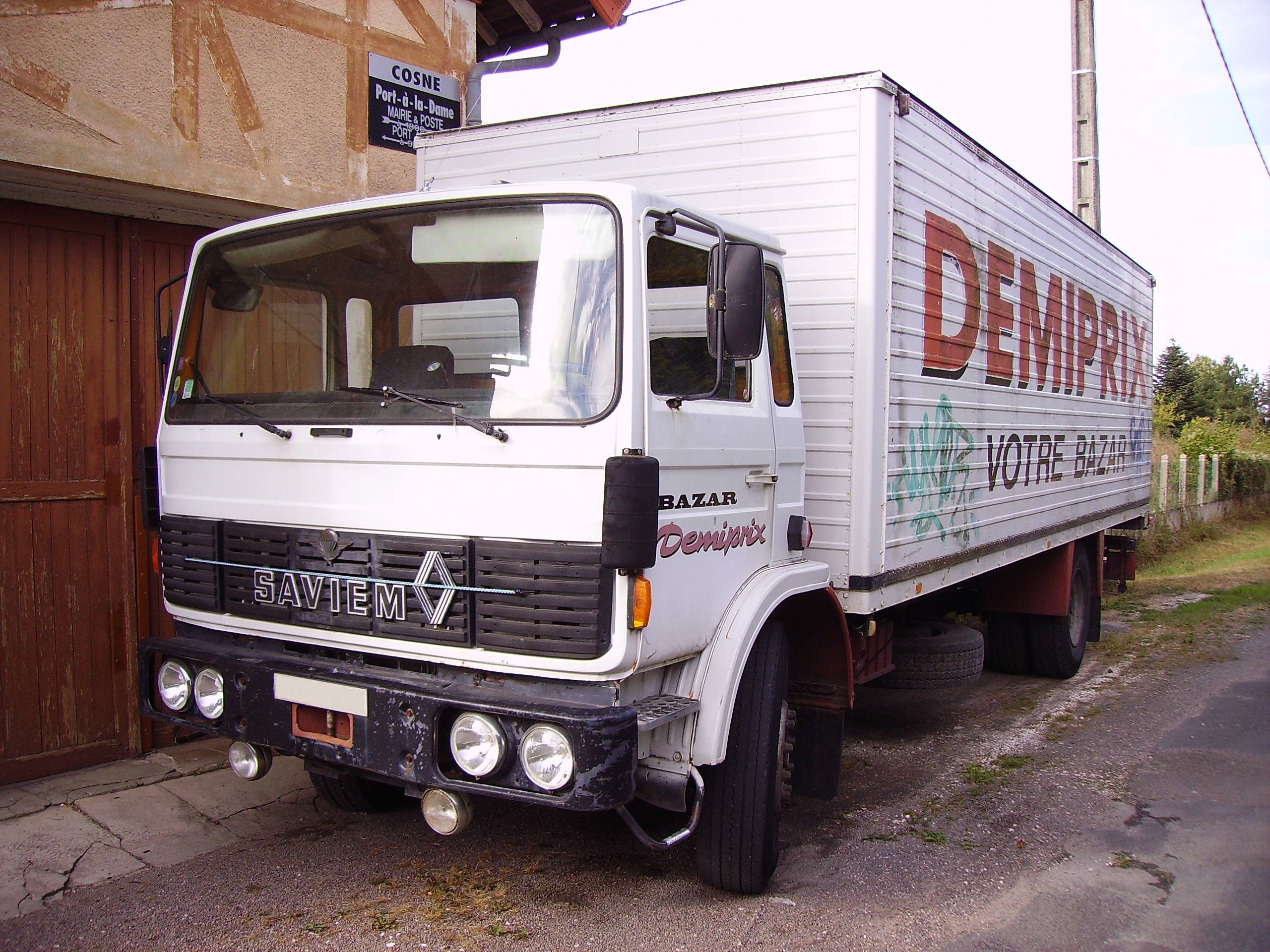
Saviem HM15

At first, H/HB-series trucks (up to 26 tonnes) and J-series light trucks (9–13 tonnes) were fitted with the Club of Four cab. Later, the cab was also used on the heavier G series, as well as the lighter JK65/75/85 trucks and the Renault C and S series. This series was briefly sold as "Saviem" trucks in Britain, but changed to Renault badging in September 1979 as part of a push to establish this brand in the British commercial vehicles' market.

RVI trucks branded as Berliet carried the Club of Four cab as well in 1978/1979.

The Club of Four cab was later adapted to Renault Midliner, Maxter, and Manager trucks.

Renault C-series (including CLM, CBB and CBH, and also GBC 180) construction and military vehicles with conventional cabins adapted Club of Four cab as well. Renault Sherpa Medium family derived from CB-series is still in production (2019).

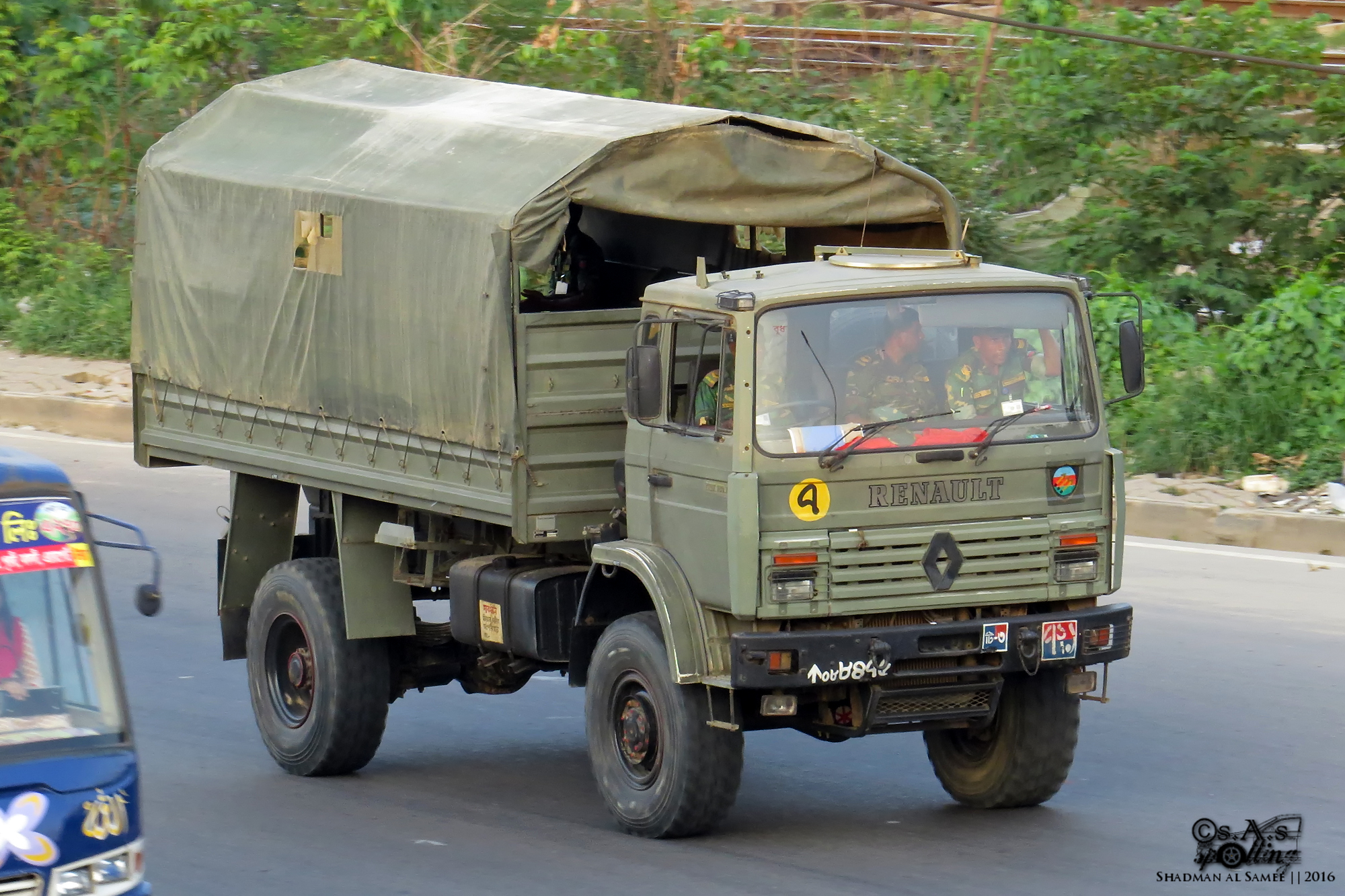
Renault TRM 180.11, a military version of Midliner, of the Bangladeshi Army

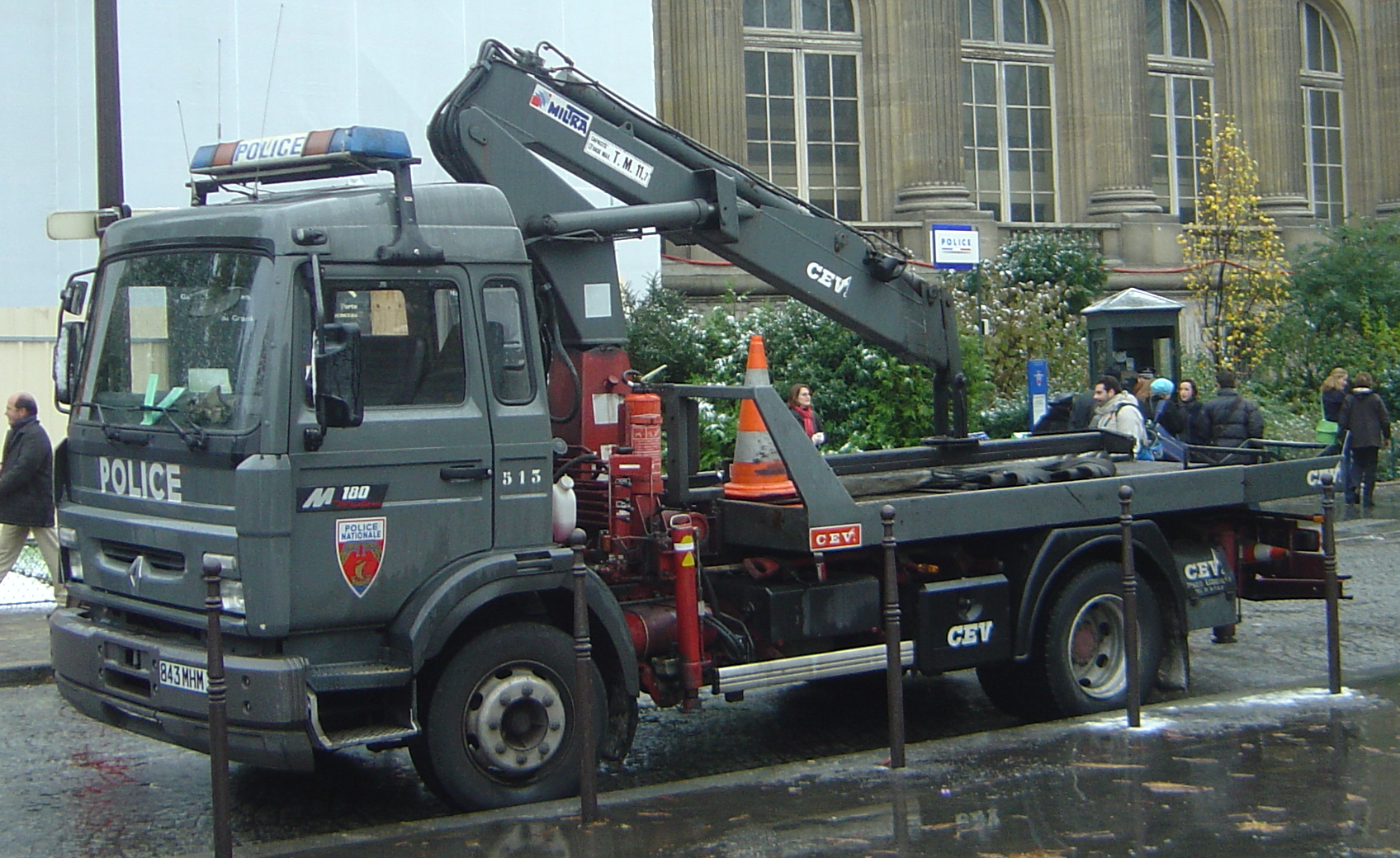
Renault Midliner, late 1990s model

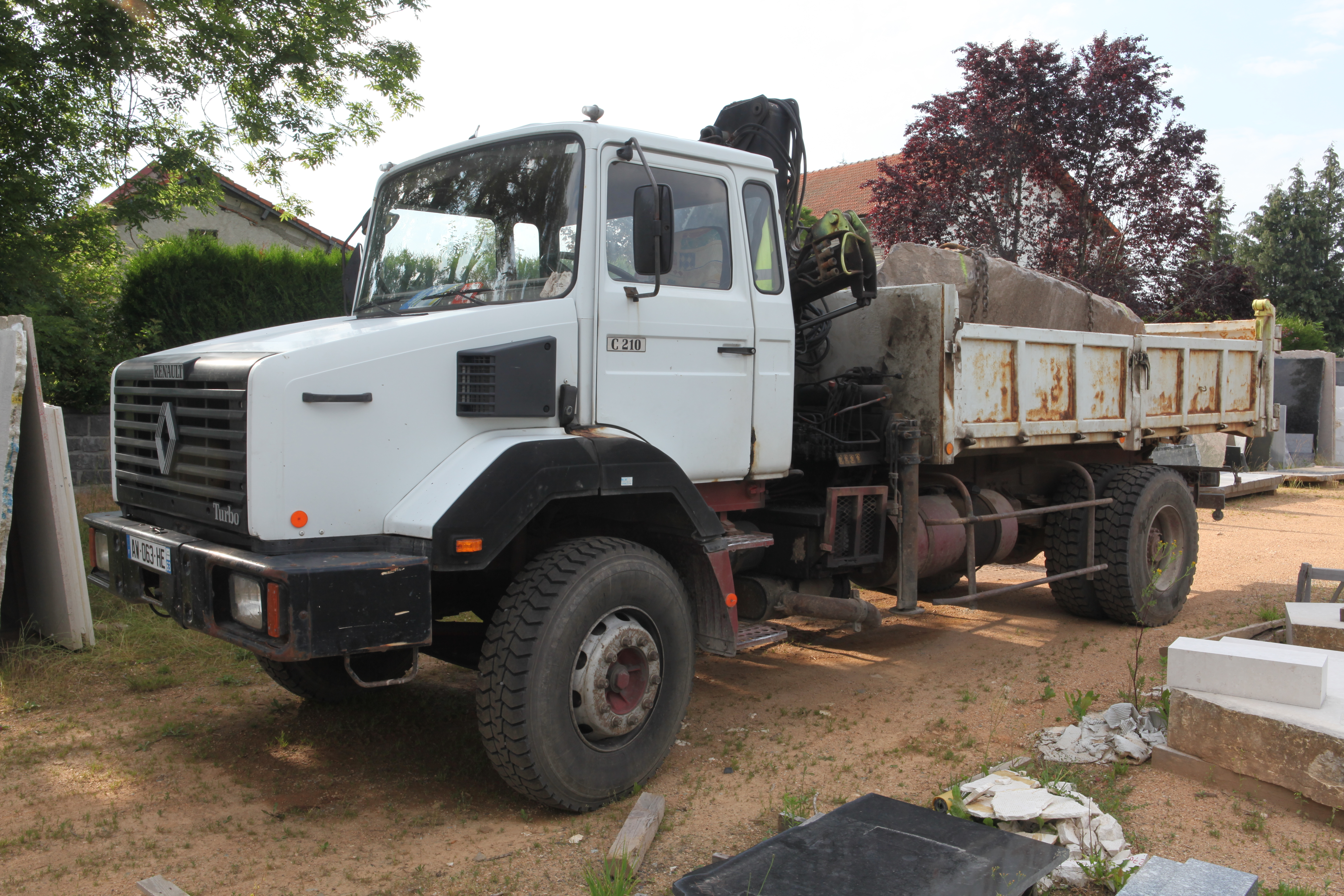
Renault C 210 dump truck

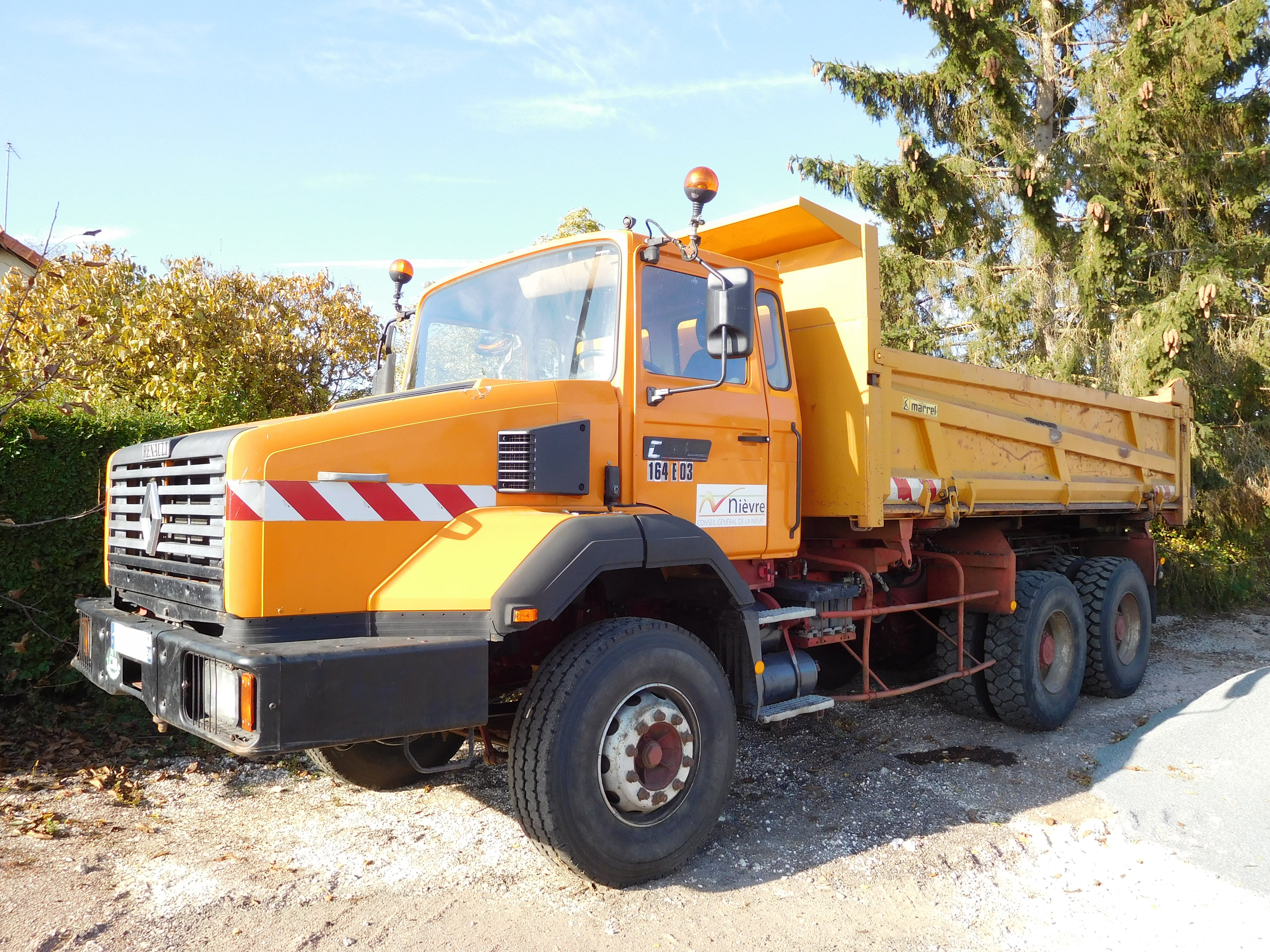
Renault CBH 350 dump truck

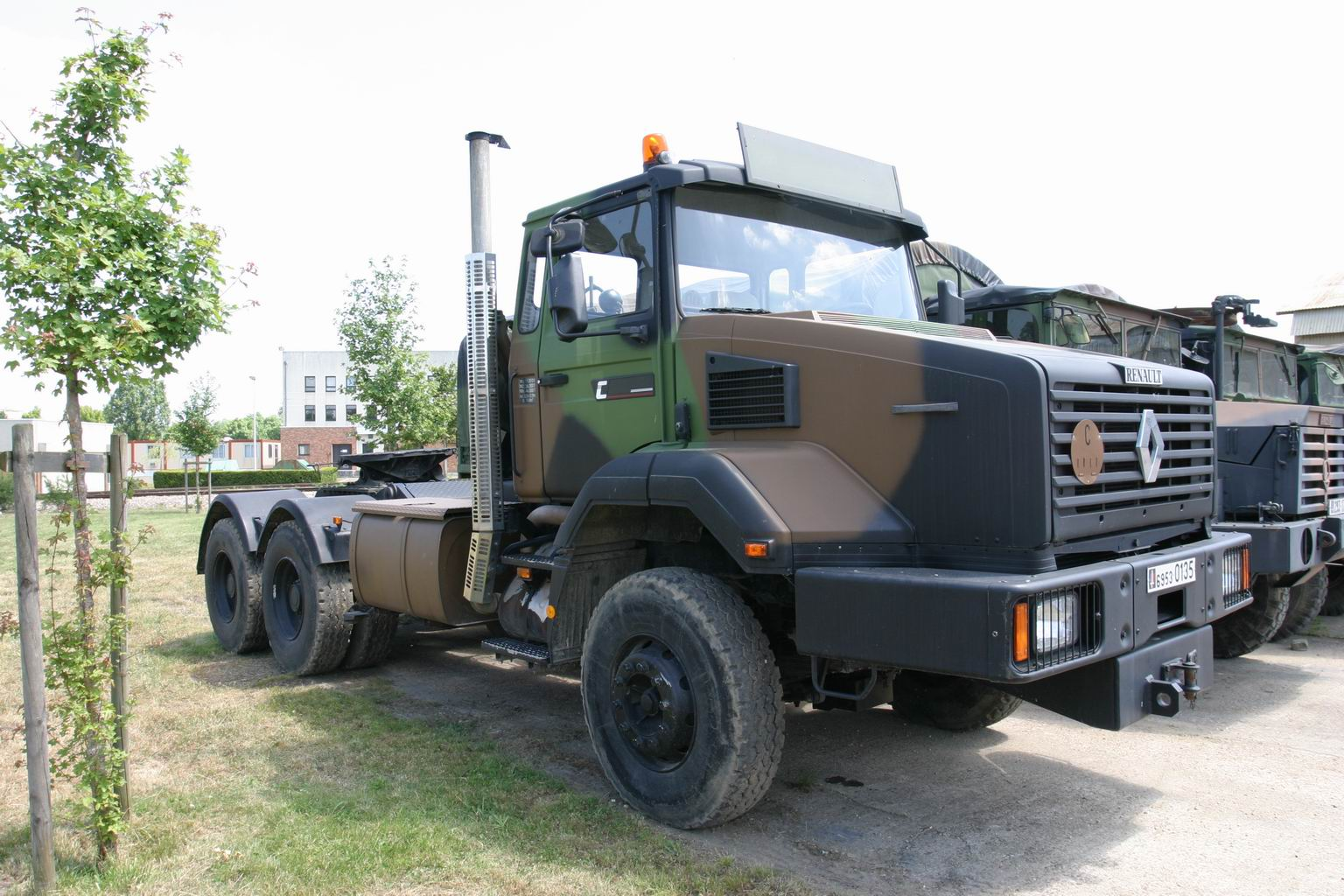
Renault CBB tractor unit of the French Army

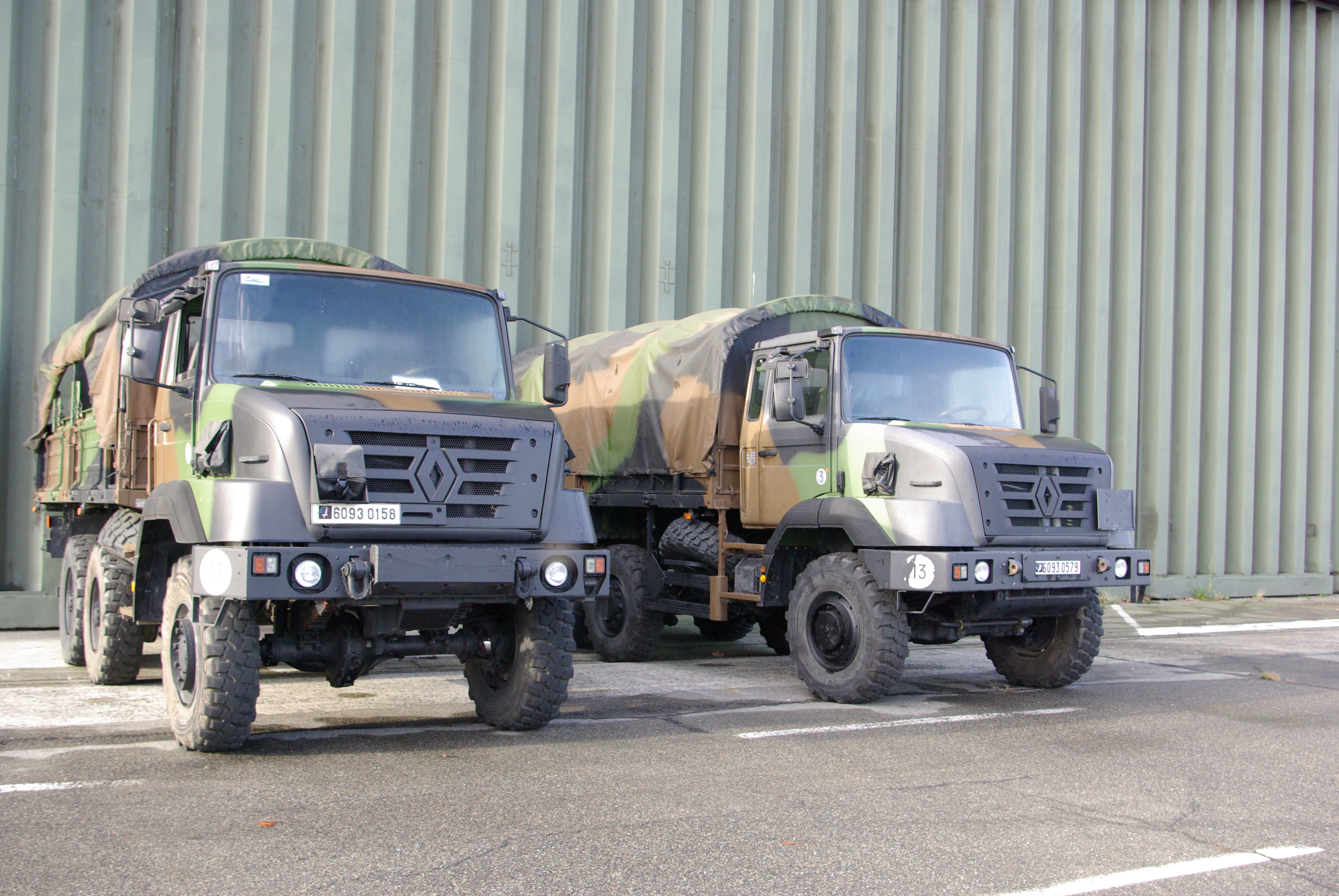
Renault Sherpa 5 trucks of the French Army

=== Magirus-Deutz (later Iveco) ===
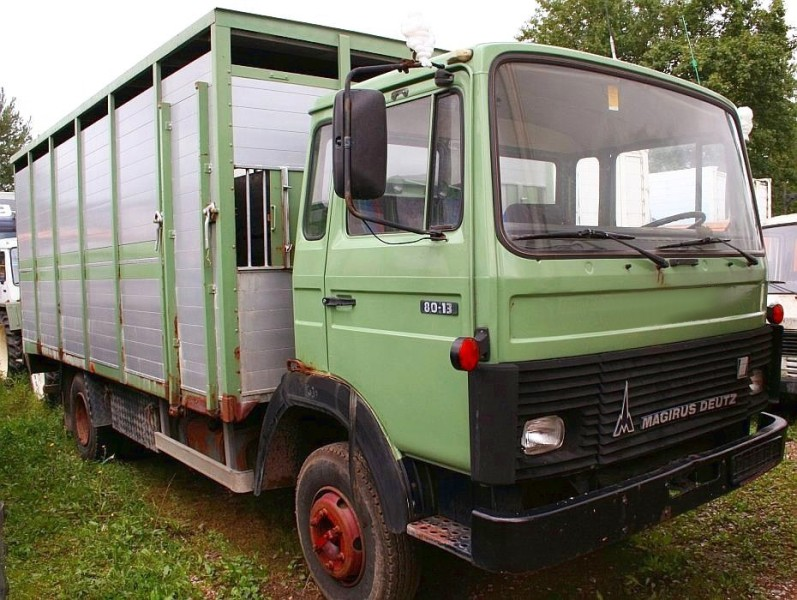
Magirus-Deutz 130M8 FL

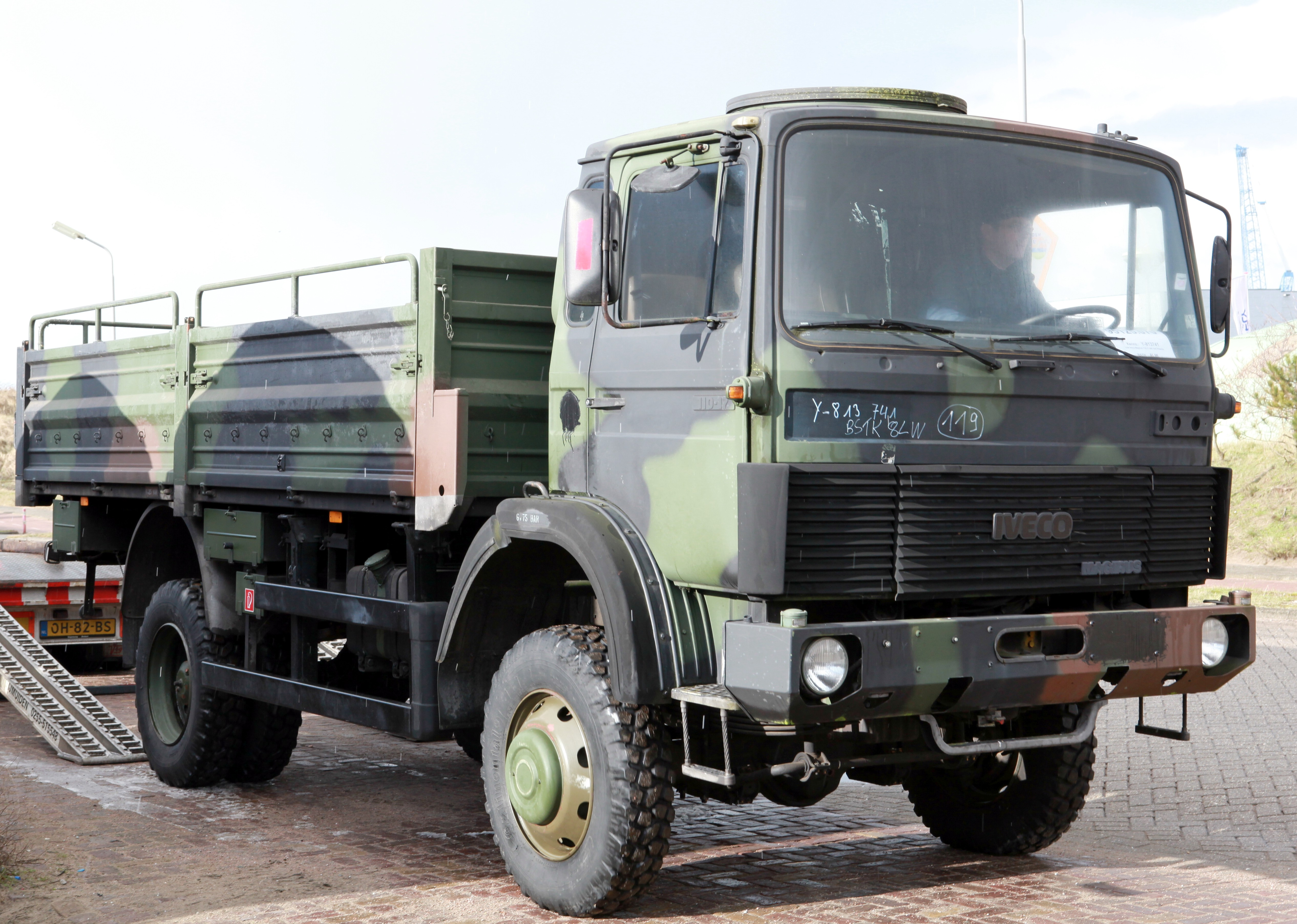
IVECO Magirus 110-17 military truck with the Club of Four cab

Magirus-Deutz intended to use the Club of Four cab on light trucks; this was inherited by Iveco as they took over the Magirus company before the cab entered production in Germany. The Iveco-built version was originally sold as the Magirus-Deutz MK range in Germany and certain other markets, this became the Magirus-Iveco in the early 1980s.

Iveco, having owned Magirus since 1975, sold the truck as a Magirus or Iveco-Magirus (with slightly changed designations) until they retired the Magirus badge entirely. From then on, Iveco marketed the Club of Four truck - still as the "MK" - directly under their own name. Production came to an end in 1992 as it was replaced by the Iveco Eurocargo, although limited production of crew cabs for special applications continued a little while longer.

=== DAF ===
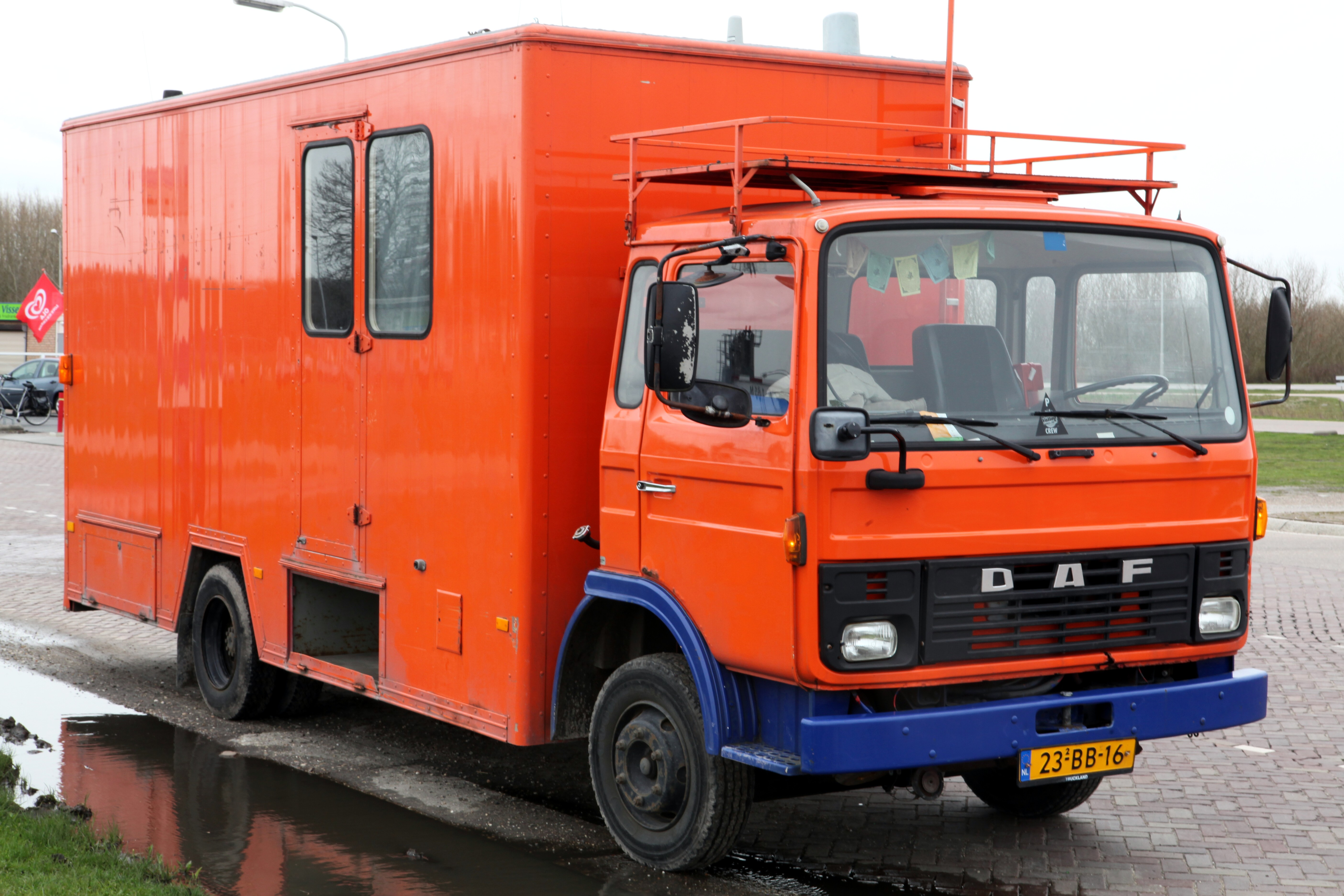
DAF FA900

DAF started using the Club of Four cab in 1975 on the DAF F700 and F900; it was later used on the F500, F1100, F1300, and F1500. DAF merged with Leyland in 1987, and replaced its Club of Four cabs with Leyland cabs.

=== Mack ===
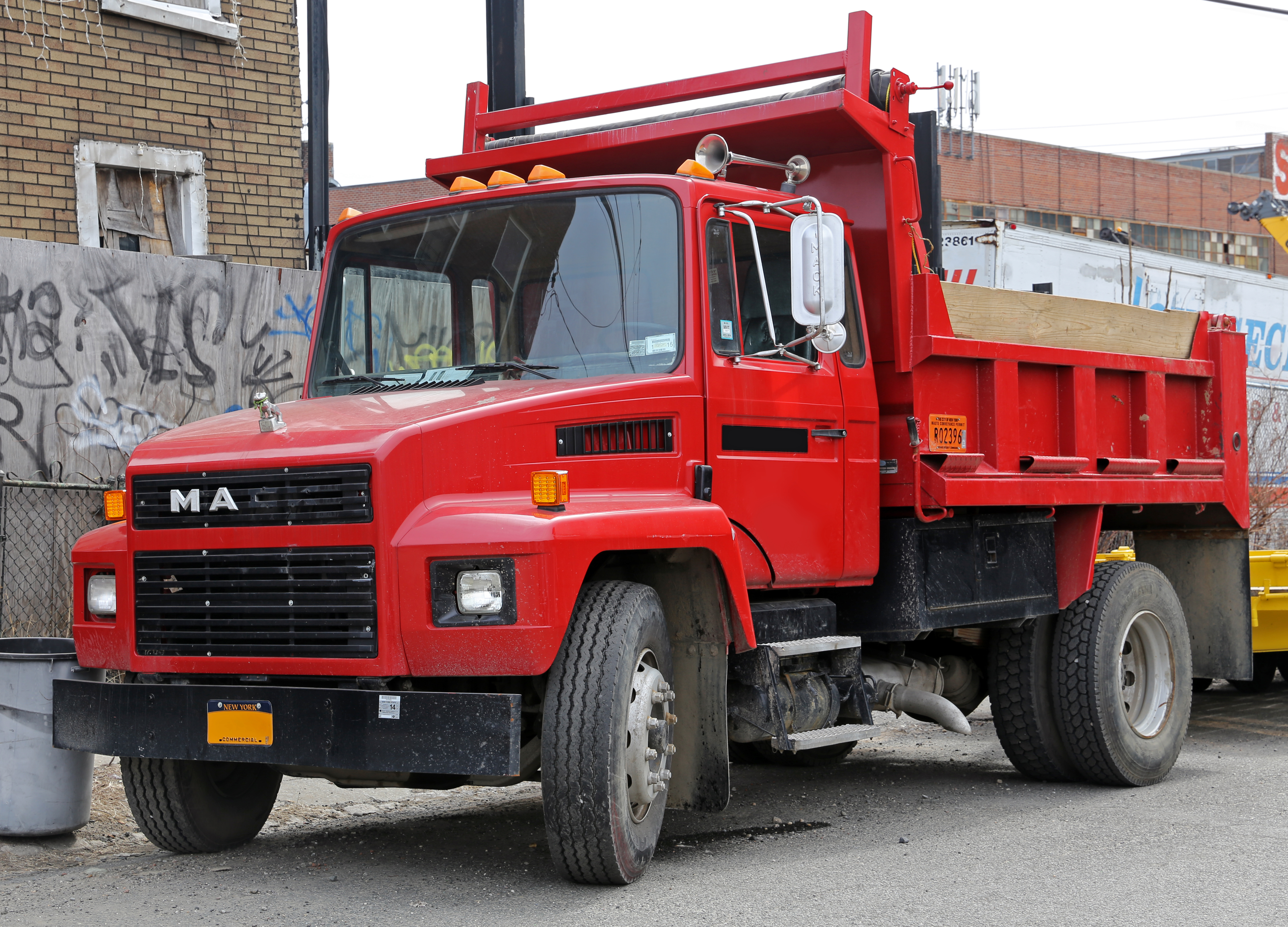
1988 Mack CS300P, the conventional version of the Mid-Liner model

American Mack also used the Club of Four cabin, thanks to their linkup with Renault (who purchased 10 percent of Mack in 1979). These competed in the Class 6 and Class 7 medium-duty weight categories. Built by RVI in France, it was sold as the Mack Mid-Liner or Manager. Originally it was available in MS200 or MS300 models, fitted with 5.5 or 8.8 litre turbocharged diesel inline-six engines respectively. These were built by Renault and offered 175 hp (130 kW) or 210 hp (157 kW). The MS300 was also available as a tractor unit. The Mack Mid-liner range was replaced in 2001 by the new Mack Freedom, also built by Renault. A heavier duty version with the less powerful engine was introduced in the mid-1980s, called the MS250.

For the North American market a bonneted version was also developed. This was called the CS (for "Conventional Styling") and appeared in 1985. As with the cab-over model, a tractor version (CS300T) was made available a little later.
