= Zuch =

Defunct Polish motorcycle manufacturer

Zuch is a defunct manufacturer of motorcycles that was located in Poznań, Poland. Production started in 1938 and was terminated following the German invasion of Poland in 1939.

== History ==
Adam Paczkowski set up Zuch as a limited company in 1938 to produce motorcycles. Initially, the marque would build motorcycles using a 98 cc engine from SM and the machines would be assembled in the Automatyk factory (which produced arcade game machines). 250 and 350 cc models were planned but these never went into production following the factory's closure after the outbreak of WW2.

== Models ==
=== Zuch 98cc ===
The SH supplied two-stroke engine was of unit construction was cast from light alloy except the cylinder which was cast iron. It was fitted with a 2 speed gearbox, which was hand operated by a lever attached to the top of the gearbox. The engine produced 3 hp at 3,500 rpm. A welded tubular, single loop frame with no rear suspension was used with pressed steel front forks

=== 250 and 350 cc models ===
250 and 350 cc models were in development but didn't go into production before the factory's closure. The 250 cc model was to be designated Druh (English: Companion).
