= SM =

SM or sm may refer to:

== Business and economics ==
- Senior management
- SM Prime, a Philippine retail operator
- SM Supermalls, Philippine chain of shopping malls
- Service mark symbol (℠)
- Spesmilo ₷, a former international currency

== Arts and media ==
- SM Entertainment, South Korean music label
- Stage manager, in theatre and other performing arts
- Stephen Malkmus (born 1966), singer of Pavement
- Studio manager, in media professions
- Super Mario, video game series

== Computing and electronics ==
- Scrum master, or SM
- .sm, San Marino top-level Internet domain
- SM EVM, Soviet computers, e.g. SM-4
- Streaming Multiprocessor
- SM, an abbreviation for Samsung Mobile

== Science ==
- "Sm.", author abbreviation for "Smith", see List of taxonomic authorities named Smith
- S.M. (patient), a patient with brain damage
- James Edward Smith (botanist) (1759–1828), botanist cited as "Sm."
- Samarium, symbol Sm, a chemical element
- Magellanic spiral, a galaxy class
- Selective mutism, an anxiety disorder
- Strength of Material

== Transportation, sports, places, military, and politics ==
=== Automotive ===
- Citroën SM, a high-performance hatchback coupé
- SM (motorcycle), defunct Polish motorcycle manufacturer
- Saviem SM, a range of medium-duty trucks
- SOMUA SM, a French experimental medium tank
- Spec Miata, a class of racing car
- Satu Mare, Romania, vehicle registration

=== Other uses in sports ===
- SM-liiga, top Finnish men's ice hockey league
- SM-sarja, Finnish former top men's ice hockey league
- Suomen mestaruus (Finnish Champion), sports award
- Swedish Championship (disambiguation) (Swedish Champion), sports award

=== Other places ===
- SM postcode area, Greater London, England
- San Marino, ISO country code

=== Trains ===
- Shanghai Metro
- Sm gauge, in rail transport modelling, a track gauge
- St. Mary's Railroad, reporting mark

=== Airplanes ===
- Prefix of some Savoia-Marchetti aircraft, e.g. SM.83
- Spirit of Manila Airlines, IATA airline code
- Swedline Express, former IATA airline code

=== Ships ===
- SM-class minesweeper, a ship class of the Finnish Navy
- A US Navy hull classification symbol: Submarine minelayer (SM)

=== Awards ===
==== Military honors ====
- Sacrifice Medal, Canada
- Sena Medal, India
- Southern Cross Medal (1952), South Africa
- Southern Cross Medal (1975), South Africa

==== Civilian honors ====
- Medal of Service of the Order of Canada, post-nominal letters

=== Other military uses ===
- Service member, a member of a branch of the military
- Standard Missile, a family of US missiles, e.g. SM-3
- SM radar, US WWII radar

=== Other uses in politics ===
- Supplementary Member in a democratic voting system
- Syndicat de la Magistrature, a French union

== Other uses ==
- Samoan language (ISO 639-1 code sm)
- Social media
- Scientiæ Magister or Master of Science
- Sadomasochism (SM, S/M or S&M)
- Society of Mary (Marianists), Roman Catholic congregation

== See also ==
- S&M (disambiguation)
