= Copenhagen Psalter =

12th-century illuminated manuscript

- Det Kgl. Bibliotek
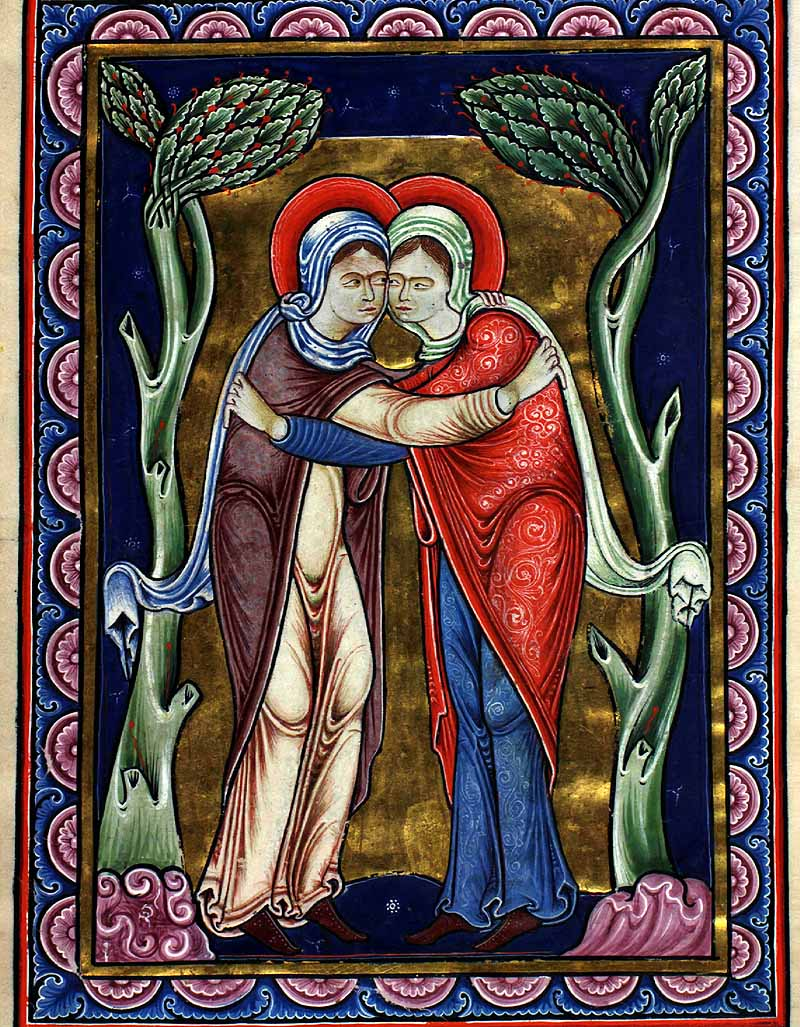
- Date: 12 Century, 1175-1200.
- Place of origin: England
- Size: 28,6 x 19,8 cm

The Copenhagen Psalter (National Library of Denmark, MS. Thott 143 2º) is a 12th-century illuminated manuscript psalter, made in England. It may have been created for the education of the boy king, King Canute VI of Denmark. This manuscript is known for the many artists who contributed to the full-page illuminations. The Copenhagen Psalter is currently in Denmark.

== History ==
=== Origin ===
This royal psalter was made in the 12th century. This manuscript was created under the influence of the Austin Canons, also known as the Augustinians, in a time of papal schism. Furthermore, the manuscript has Augustinian elements in its calendar which was made in Northern England. The manuscript was probably made in Lincoln. Because the list of saints in the manuscript does not include Thomas Becket, who was canonized in 1173, it is likely that the manuscript was executed before this year. Several artists seem to have been involved in the making of the manuscript, one of whom has been identified as the so-called Simon master, who also worked for Abbot Simon of St Albans.

Until recently, the Psalter was thought to have been made for an English royal patron, even though obital notices in the calendar indicate that the book belonged to the Danish royal family in the 13th century. This person who it was intended for must have been very young, due to the fact that the Pater noster, which is the Lords Prayer, is preceded by an alphabet, indicating that the book was to be used as a primer.

Much seems to indicate that the book was made for King Canute VI of Denmark, and commissioned by Bishop Eskil of Lund who was actually one of the artists. The bishop was in France between 1158 and 1168, where he met an artist who seems to have subsequently traveled to England and oversaw the creation of this psalter in Lincoln. When Eskil returned to Denmark in 1168, he was commissioned with preparing celebrations in 1170 for the upcoming coronation of the seven year old Canute as co-ruler with his father, King Valdemar the Great (reigned 1157–82), and for the canonization of Saint Canute. Perhaps because it was made for a boy king, just seven years old, the Copenhagen Psalter includes an alphabet, and aside from its religious use, could be used to teach the young king to read.

Christopher de Hamel in 2016 also remarked that although the illumination is in the English manner, it could have been executed (perhaps by an English team) either in Paris or even in Denmark. The evidence is inconclusive.

=== Sister Manuscript ===
The Copenhagen Psalter has a sister manuscript, called the Hunterian Psalter (also referred to as the York Psalter in earlier literature). This psalter has the same stylistic features as the Copenhagen Psalter, but different iconography. It was also most likely made for another member of the Danish royal house. Although there is uncertainty about who it was for, it has been suggested that it was made for Roger de Mowbray, a crusader and religious benefactor known to have founded a number of Augustinian and Cistercian monasteries and nunneries.

== Description ==
=== Illuminations ===
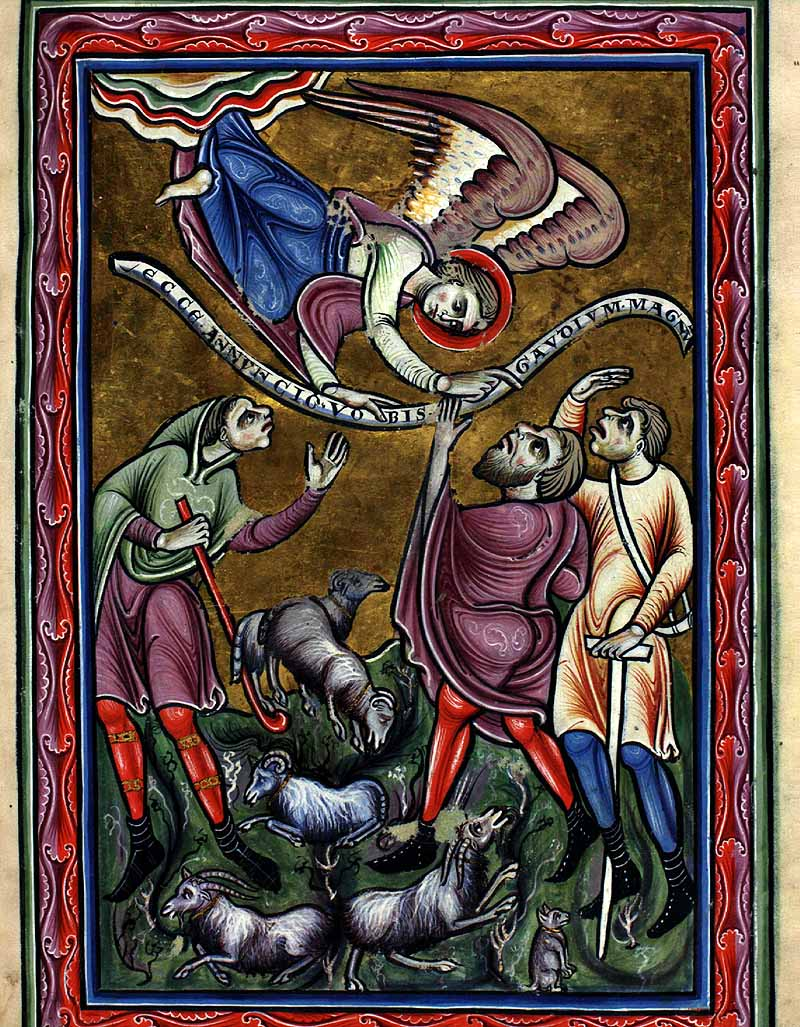
The Annunciation to the Shepherds

The Copenhagen Psalter begins with a calendar and a set of full-page miniatures illustrating the life of Christ. The manuscript also contains 166 illuminated initials. This book has a calendar that shows various English feasts.

Saint Oswald, who was given the highest level of veneration who as a patron of the Augustinian Order. Within the psalter there are a number of illuminated initials, a cycle of full page illuminations. These pages consist of scenes from the life of Christ such as Birth, Crucifixion and Resurrection.The pictures shown in this manuscript are only half of the sequence and most likely, it had more than eight leaves with 16 Old Testament pictures.

One of the first illuminations shown is the Annunciation where the angel Gabriel greets the Virgin Mary and a dove that is the Holy Spirit. Gabriel and Mary both hold scrolls inscribed in Latin.

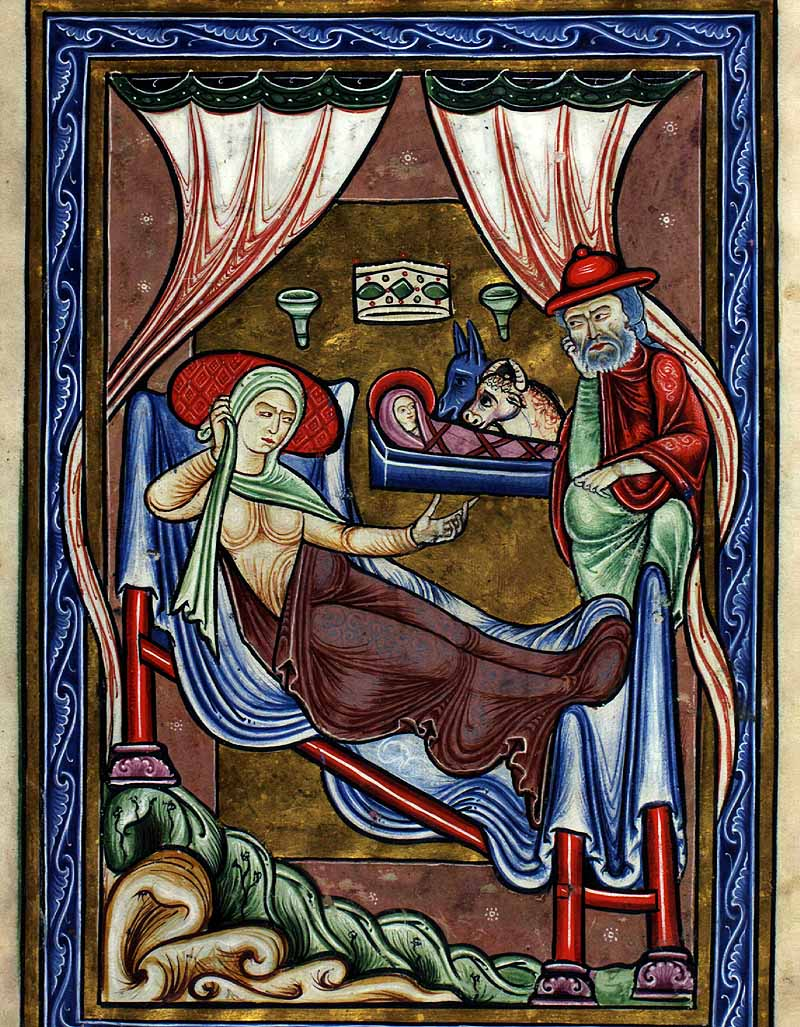
Nativity

On the other side of the same manuscript leaf (the verso), the Nativity itself is illustrated. The Virgin is recovering after giving birth in the foreground and the Christ Child, swaddled, with a red halo, lies in the manger in the background, admired by the animals in the stable. Both Mary and Joseph look to Jesus, the focal point of the image.

Another illumination is the Annunciation to the Shepherds, with an angel coming down from heaven proclaiming Christ's birth to three startled shepherds. Again, the angel holds a scroll in Latin.

Although the text of a manuscript is important, the illuminations are just as they tell the narrative. These illuminations are filled with vibrant colors. They are bold, rich, and contain dark colors like red, blues, and green. Not only do the colors show the thoughtfulness in design, but there are patterns within the borders. The patterns are vine-like, spiral, and other organic designs.

=== Text and Script ===
Inside of the manuscript, the writing is almost certain to have been written by an English scribe. There are characteristics trailing-topped "a", "g" not quite closed in its lower loop with an ampersand.

The calendar inside of the Psalter shows the English ancestry; it is written in black in but some of the calligraphy is in red, blue, or green.

=== Materials ===
It has 199 leaves, is made of parchment and measures 28.6 centimetres (11.3 in) x 19.8 centimetres (7.8 in). The calligraphy and the illuminations are of the very highest quality. Five or six English artists participated in painting its exquisite miniatures of the Life of Christ and 166 historiated and decorated initials. Within this manuscript around the opening initial there are seven large gold stars within the stars are jewels. As the manuscript shows sophistication by using gold and jewels, it shows throughout the manuscript in the recurring images of kings.
