= MSM =

MSM may refer to:

== Arts, entertainment, and media ==
- Mainstream media, collective term for large, influential mass news sources
- Miami Sound Machine, an American band
- My Singing Monsters, a Canadian musical video game on mobile and PC
- "Monkeys Spinning Monkeys", a song by Kevin MacLeod
- Mario Sports Mix, a sports video game for the Nintendo Wii

== Education ==
=== Degrees ===
- Master of Sacred Music
- Master of Science in Management

=== Institutions ===
==== Europe ====
- Maastricht School of Management, in the Netherlands
- Department of Materials Science and Metallurgy, University of Cambridge, in the UK
- Mercator School of Management, in Germany

==== United States ====
- Manhattan School of Music, New York City
- Marriott School of Management, Provo, Utah
- Missouri School of Mines and Metallurgy, former name of Missouri University of Science and Technology, Rolla, Missouri
- Morehouse School of Medicine, Atlanta, Georgia

== Finance and economics ==
- Markov switching multifractal, a model of asset returns
- Method of simulated moments, in econometrics
- Muscat Securities Market, a stock exchange in Oman

== Military ==
- Meritorious Service Medal (disambiguation), a military award in several nations
- Mine setting mode, of a minesweeper

== Organizations ==
- Militant Socialist Movement, a political party in Mauritius
- Minnesota Streetcar Museum
- Multi Screen Media, former name of the Indian company Sony Pictures Networks
- Microsoft Mobile

== People ==
- M.Sm., the author abbreviation for Matilda Smith
- Divine Ms. M, American entertainer

== Science and medicine ==
- Men who have sex with men, a group identifier used in medical literature and social research
- Mens Sana Monographs, on medicine and mental health
- Methylsulfonylmethane, a chemical compound and dietary supplement

== Technology ==
- Mobile Station Modem, a Qualcomm Snapdragon processor prefix, e.g. MSM8960
- .msm, file extension for a Microsoft Windows Merge Module

== Other uses ==
- Madras and Southern Mahratta Railway, former rail in India
- Mechanically separated meat, a food product
- Modern Standard Mandarin, the Chinese lingua franca

== See also ==
- Master-slave manipulator Mk 8 (MSM-8), a type of remote manipulator
- M. S. M. Aslam, Sri Lankan politician
- M. S. M. Anandan, Indian politician
- MSMS (disambiguation)
