= MS 22 =

MS 22, MS-22 or MS22 may refer to:

- Mississippi Highway 22 (MS 22), a state highway in central Mississippi, United States
- Soyuz MS-22, a Russian Soyuz crewed spaceflight to the ISS
- Progress MS-22, a Russian Progress cargo spaceflight to the ISS
- Minuscule 22 (MS22), Codex Colbertinus 2467, ε 288), a Greek minuscule manuscript of the New Testament

== See also ==
- MS-2 (disambiguation)
- MS222 (disambiguation)
