= MSMS =

MSMS may refer to:

- Tandem mass spectrometry (MS/MS)
- Michigan State Medical Society
- Miami Springs Middle School
- Mississippi School for Mathematics and Science
- Master of Science in Management Studies
- Making Science Make Sense, an outreach program from Bayer Corporation
- MSMs, or men who have sex with men

== See also ==
- MS2 (disambiguation)
- MSM (disambiguation)
- MS (disambiguation)
