= M&S (disambiguation) =

M&S may stand for:

== Companies ==
- Marks & Spencer, a British department store established in 1884
- M&S, former name of Dutch fashion retailer MS Mode
- McCormick & Schmick's, American seafood restaurant chain

== Music ==
- M&S (production team), British house music production duo

== Other uses ==
- Mario & Sonic
- Modeling and simulation
- Mud and snow tires

== See also ==
- MS (disambiguation)
- S&M (disambiguation)
- M/S
