= Morane-Saulnier MoS-121 =

Fighter prototype

MoS 121
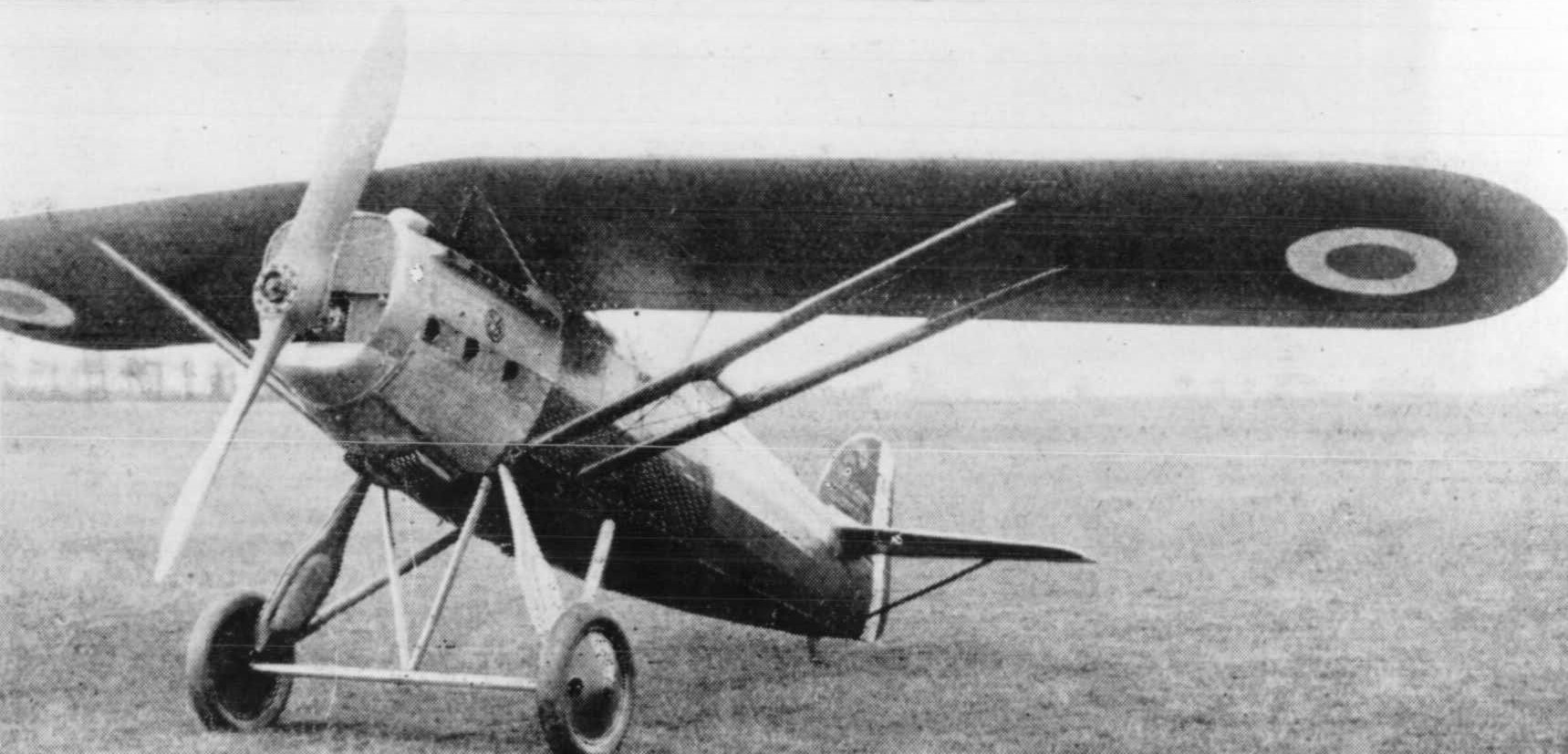

General information
- Type: Fighter
- National origin: France
- Manufacturer: Morane-Saulnier
- Number built: 1

History
- First flight: 1927

The Morane-Saulnier MoS-121, also known as the Morane-Saulnier MS.121, was a fighter prototype designed and produced by the French aircraft manufacturer Morane-Saulnier. It was the company's first fighter design after the First World War.

The MS.121 was developed in response to the launch of a state-led programme for chasseurs légers or 'light fighters' in the mid 1920s. Many of the features, such as the parasol wing and the undercarriage, largely conformed to Morane-Saulnier’s existing design practices. In order to increase lift and lower landing distances, the pilot could lower the aircraft’s ailerons mid-flight. The fuel tank could also be jettisoned if required. Mixed construction, including multiple types of wood and duralumin, were used throughout the aircraft.

During mid-1927, the sole MS.121 prototype performed its maiden flight. Although it underwent official testing, no production aircraft were ever produced. The company terminated the project in favour of other endeavours, such as the Morane-Saulnier MS.221.

== Development ==
As a direct result of concern over the escalating cost of fighter manufacture, the French government and air force jointly instituted a programme for chasseurs légers or 'light fighters' in 1926. This was unofficially known as the 'Jockey' program, and it envisaged the use of moderate guns, minimal equipment and small amounts of ammunition. Emphasis was placed on climb rate, endurance and a ceiling (high for the time) of 8000 metres. In response to this requirement, Morane-Saulnier designed the MoS-121, renamed the MS.121 in 1927; it was intended to be primarily operated as a single-seat monoplane fighter.

The MS.121 was furnished with a parasol wing, a design featured that originated from the Morane-Saulnier during the early 1910s. This wing was of uniform thickness across its whole span; its chord was similarly uniform. It had no dihedral but did feature a relatively pronounced sweepback . The middle of the wing was fastened to a metal cabane and was rigidly held in position by a pair of braced struts that were positioned at either side of the fuselage.

The wing was of mixed construction; the structural members comprised a pair of spars with openwork rectangular tubs. The ribs were composed of wood, the covering was largely fabric aft of the forward spar, the leading edge was covered with plywood, and the ailerons had a framework made of duralumin. The ailerons, which were relatively narrow and unbalanced, ran across the entire span of the wing and were rigidly controlled via two rods. The pilot used a wheel to lower them mid-flight in order to increase the aircraft’s lift and thereby permit lower landing speeds to be used.

The fuselage was mostly conventional for the era, being primarily composed of wood, except for the first two bays, which were made of metal instead. The framework was braced by piano wires. The exterior of the aircraft was covered by ribbed duralumin towards the front while fabric was used for all areas aft of the pilot's cockpit, which was located well behind the wings. The cockpit was large enough for the pilot to readily move about, even when equipped with a parachute. Both the seat and the rudder bar were adjustable.

The MS.121 was armed with a pair of forward firing 7.7 mm (0.303 in) Vickers machine-guns which fired directly through the propeller arc. An Optique et Précision de Levallois-supplied collimator functioned as a sight for the pilot. The horizontal empennage comprises a stabilizer (which could be adjusted mid-flight via the use of a wheel) and a two-part unbalanced elevator. The vertical empennage consisted of a fin and an unbalanced rudder. All of the tail planes were composed of duralumin and covered with fabric. The stabilizer was braced from beneath by a single strut as well as from above via a streamlined wire.

As built, the aircraft was powered by a single Hispano-Suiza 12Jb engine, which (together with its accessories) formed a complete block and thus could be relatively quickly removed for servicing, repair, or replacement. A total of four bolts were used to secure it to the framework of the fuselage. Cooling was achieved using a frontal radiator of an in-house honeycomb design, complete with regulating shutters. Various precautions were in place to manage the risk of a fire in the engine bay, this included a fire extinguisher, removable fuel tank, and a fire wall.

It was outfitted with a conical-shaped fuel tank, positioned directly in front of the pilot’s seat (being separately contained by a firewall comprising two sheets of metal and a single sheet of asbestos) that had a capacity of 210 liters (55.5 gallons). If required, the tank could be dropped mid-flight. Fuel was supplied to the engine by a pair of disconnectable pumps.

The landing gear conformed with the typical conventions of the company, such as its use of a pair of independent half-axles. The struts of the landing gear were directly attached to the lower longerons of the fuselage via special pivoting joints that eliminated the danger of breaking one of the longerons if one of the struts were to buckle during a hard landing. The shock absorbers, which were located in the plane of the lateral V-shaped struts, consisted of a certain number of independent rubber loops that could be easily replaced; the entirety was fully enclosed within the covering of the front struts. To facilitate ground manoeuvring, the pilot was able to control the orientation of the tail skid in a manner that was independent of the rudder. It was attached to the fuselage by two bolts.

== Operational history ==
The MS.121 prototype performed its maiden flight in mid-1927. During official testing, it demonstrated its above average ability to climb. However, no production aircraft were ever produced as a result of the company having opted to cease its work on the project in favour of a more capable fighter in the form of the Morane-Saulnier MS.221.

== Specifications (MoS-121) ==
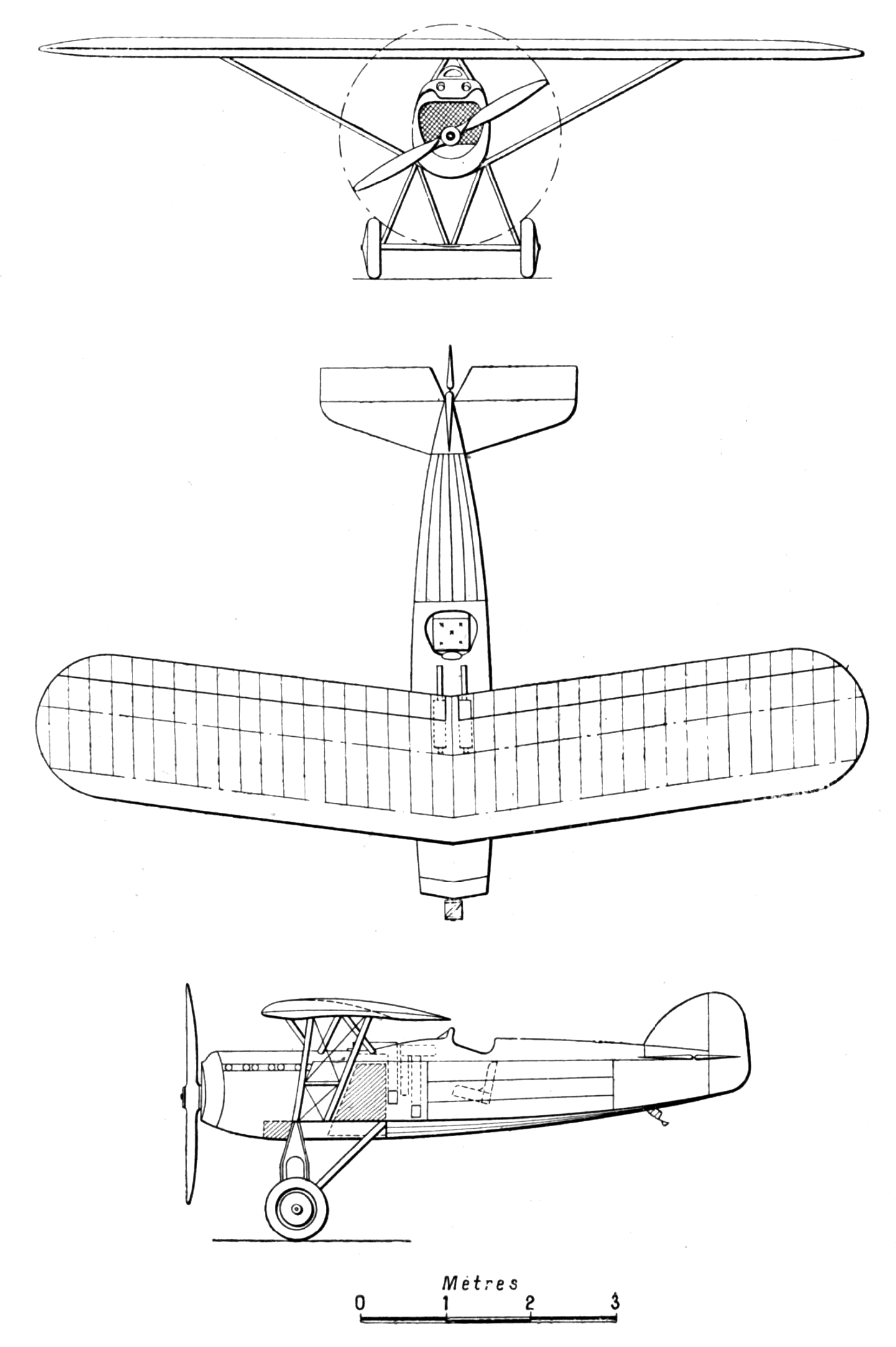
Morane-Saulnier MS.121 3-view drawing from L'Aéronautique June,1928

Data from Jane's all the World's Aircraft 1928, The Complete Book of Fighters

General characteristics

- Crew: One
- Length: 6.717 m (22 ft 0 in)
- Wingspan: 9.8 m (32 ft 2 in)
- Height: 2.885 m (9 ft 6 in)
- Wing area: 16 m^{2} (170 sq ft)
- Empty weight: 990 kg (2,183 lb)
- Gross weight: 1,250 kg (2,756 lb)
- Powerplant: 1 × Hispano-Suiza 12Jb , 347 kW (465 hp)
- Propellers: Twin-bladed wooden fixed pitch propeller

Performance

- Maximum speed: 253 km/h (157 mph, 137 kn) at 1,000 m (3,300 ft)

250 km/h (160 mph; 130 kn) at 2,500 m (8,200 ft)
246 km/h (153 mph; 133 kn) at 3,500 m (11,500 ft)

- Endurance: 1.5 hours at full throttle
- Service ceiling: 8,700 m (28,500 ft)
- Time to altitude: 1,500 m (4,900 ft) in three minutes and 44 seconds

3,500 m (11,500 ft) in nine minutes and 19 seconds
4,500 m (14,800 ft) in 13 minutes and 11 seconds
6,500 m (21,300 ft) in 25 minutes and 25 seconds
7,500 m (24,600 ft) in 36 minutes and five seconds

- Wing loading: 78 kg/m^{2} (16 lb/sq ft)
- Power/mass: 0.2694 kW/kg (0.1639 hp/lb)

Armament

- Guns: 2x fixed forward firing 7.7 mm (0.303 in) Vickers machine-guns with 300 rpg
