= M/S =

m/s is the symbol for metre per second, a unit of both speed and velocity.

example: speed of sound=340 m/s.

M/S or m/s may also refer to:

- Motor ship, also MS, MV, M/V, or motor vessel, a maritime prefix
- M/S stereo coding (Mid/Side stereo encoding), in audio engineering
- Master/slave (BDSM)
- Messrs., especially in India as a prefix to a firm or company name.

== See also ==
- m/s^{2}, metre per second squared
- m/s^{3}, a unit of jerk
- m/s^{4}, a unit of jounce
- MS (disambiguation)
- M&S (disambiguation)
