= Swedish Championship =

Swedish Championship may refer to:

- Swedish Championships in Alpine skiing
- Athletics
  - Swedish Athletics Championships
  - Swedish Indoor Athletics Championships
- Swedish National Badminton Championships
- List of Swedish bandy champions
- Swedish Chess Championship
- Swedish Championships in Cross-country skiing
- Swedish Figure Skating Championships
- List of Swedish football champions
- List of Swedish ice hockey champions
- Motorsport
  - Swedish Karting Championship
  - Swedish Speedway Championship
  - Swedish Touring Car Championship
- Swimming
  - Swedish Swimming Championships
  - Swedish Short Course Swimming Championships
  - Swedish Junior's Swimming Championships
  - Swedish Youth Swimming Championships
  - Swedish Youth Short Course Swimming Championships
- Table tennis
  - Swedish Table Tennis Championships
  - Swedish Open Championships
