= MSS (disambiguation) =

MSS is the Ministry of State Security for China.

MSS may also refer to:

== Places ==
- Manassas (Amtrak station) (station code), Virginia, US
- Massena International Airport (IATA code), New York, US
- Moses Gate railway station (National Rail station code), England

== Organizations ==
=== Education ===
==== Canada ====
- Midland Secondary School

==== China ====
- Marymount Secondary School, Hong Kong

==== Singapore ====
- Marsiling Secondary School, a secondary school in Woodlands
- Meridian Secondary School, a secondary school in Pasir Ris
- Montfort Secondary School, a secondary school in Hougang

==== United Kingdom and British Overseas Territories ====
- Monkton Combe School, near Bath, England (for Monkton Combe Senior School)
- Montserrat Secondary School, Salem, Montserrat (British Overseas Territory)

==== United States ====
- Meskwaki Settlement School, Tama County, Iowa

==== Other ====
- Master of Social Science, a postgraduate degree
- Master of Strategic Studies, awarded by military colleges such as Marine Corps University

=== Other organizations ===
- Ministry for State Security (disambiguation), multiple organizations
- Merseyside Skeptics Society, UK, for scientific scepticism
- The Mother's Service Society, a social science research institute in Pondicherry, India
- Manufacturers Standardization Society, an organization in the valve and fittings industry

== Science and technology ==
=== Computing ===
- Managed security service, in outsourced networks
- IBM 3850 Mass Storage System
- Maximum segment size, a TCP header parameter in computer networking
- Microsoft Search Server
- Miles Sound System, a sound software development kit for video games

=== Other science and technology ===
- Marshall–Smith syndrome, characterized by unusual accelerated skeletal maturation
- Microsatellite stability, in genetics
- Multispectral Scanner, on Landsat satellites
- Mobile satellite service, in telecommunications
- Mobile Servicing System, a robotic system on board the International Space Station
- Mobile switching centre server, in mobile telephony
- Monosulfide solid solution, a phase of paragenesis

== Other uses ==
- Mario Super Sluggers, a baseball video game for the Nintendo Wii
- Modern Shetlandic Scots, a name for Shetland dialect used by some linguists
- Modular Sleep System, a US forces sleeping bag
- MSS or Mss., an abbreviation for manuscripts (handwritten documents)
- Movable scaffolding system, used for construction of concrete bridges
- A US Navy hull classification symbol: Minesweeper (Special device) (MSS)
- Music source separation, a technique of separating one audio track into multiple audio tracks
