= Simon master =

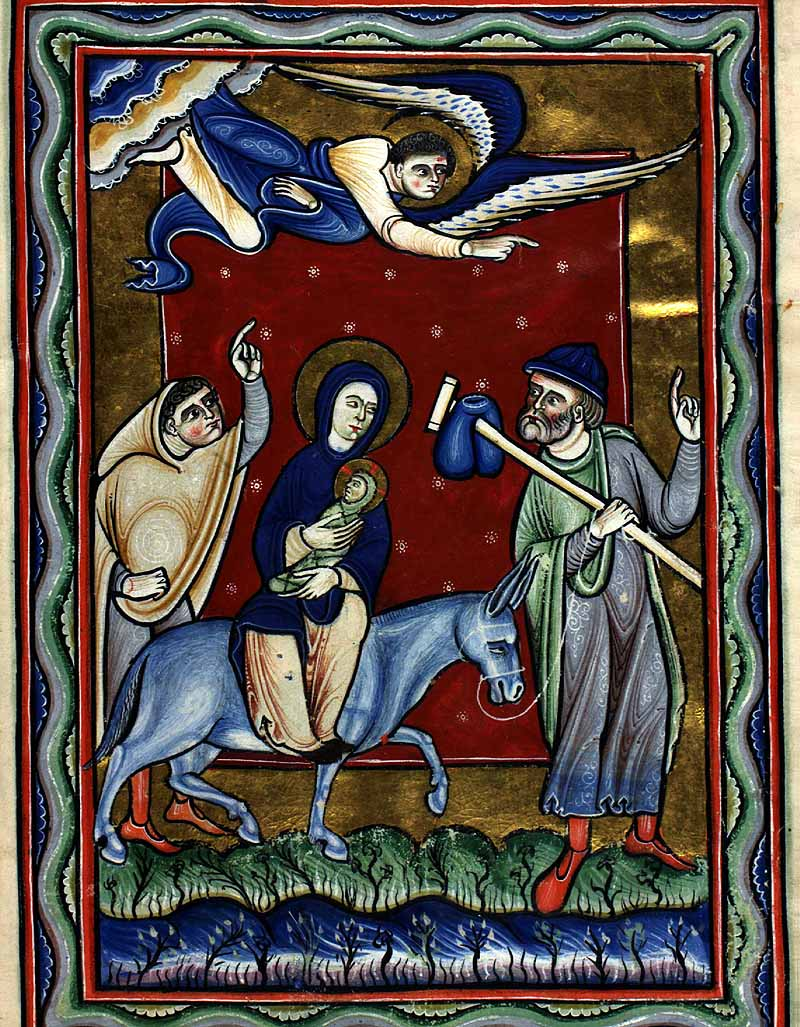

The Simon master was a manuscript illuminator who lived in 12th-century Paris and later moved to St Albans during the time of Simon (1167–1183), Abbot of St Albans, after whom he is named by art historians.

The artist is particularly known for the Copenhagen Psalter. He was also involved in the creation of two manuscripts of the works of Robert of Cricklade, and may have been an illuminator living in Oxford, perhaps as Roger the illuminator who is known to have lived there around 1190.

Initials in the following manuscripts have been attributed to the artist:

- Cambridge, Corpus Christi College, MS 380 (1170s)
- Cambridge, Trinity Hall, MS 2 (1170s-80s)
- Copenhagen, Royal Library, MS Thott 143 2º (c. 1170)
- Esztergom, Basilica Library, MS 1.21 (1170s–80s)
- Eton, College Library, MS 134 (1170s)
- Klosterneuburg, Stiftsbibliothek, MS 1089 (1170s–80s)
- Lambeth, Palace Library, MS 102 (1170s)
- Münster, Universitätsbibliothek, MS 222 (1150s–60s)
- Oxford, Bodleian Library, MS Auct. D. 3. 10 (1170s)
- Oxford, Bodleian Library, MS Bodley 862 (1150s)
- Oxford, St John's College, MS 26 (1170s)
- Oxford, St John's College, MS 27 (1170s–80s)
- Paris, Bibliothèque de l'Arsenal, MS 233 (1170s–80s)
- Paris, Bibliothèque nationale de France, MS lat. 74 (1170s–80s)
- Paris, Bibliothèque nationale de France, MS lat. 6047 (1180s–90s)
- Paris, Bibliothèque nationale de France, MS lat 16743–6 (1170s–80s)
