= SM (motorcycle) =

Defunct Polish motorcycle manufacturer

- Industry: Motorcycle manufacturer
- Founded: 1937 in Poznań, Poland
- Founder: Stefan Malcherek
- Defunct: 1939
- Products: SM 98

SM is a defunct Polish motorcycle manufacturer founded by Stefan Malcherek. They produced lightweight motorcycles in Poznań, Poland from 1937 to 1939 and also supplied engines to other manufacturers.

== History ==
Stefan Malcherek established the SM Workshop in Poznań in 1924, which manufactured a 50 cc auxiliary engine that could be fitted to a bicycle. It was mounted above the front wheel and drove the wheel by means of a roller. At the 1935 Poznań Fair he presented a 2hp two-stroke outboard motor which was well received. He adapted the 98 cc engine for use in a motorcycle and constructed a light motorcycle around the engine. The machine debuted at a competition organised by the Unia motorcycling club in December 1937. Although the competition was won by a German Phanomen machine, the SM was seen to be a good competitor. The machine went into production and was well received for its reliability.

SM supplied the engine to two other Poznań manufacturers: Nowaczyk Brothers' Bicycle Manufacture for use in their WNP 3-wheelers and Automatyk for their Zuch 98cc motorbike. Production ceased following the German invasion of Poland in 1939.

== SM 98 ==
The unit construction 98 cc two-stroke engine was cast from light alloy except the cylinder which was cast iron. It was fitted with a 2 speed gearbox, which was hand operated by a lever attached to the top of the gearbox. The engine produced 3 hp at 3,500 rpm.

A tubular, single loop frame with no rear suspension was used. Front forks were of the girder type. A single seat was fitted. The machine was known for its frugal fuel consumption and reliability.
