= STM =

STM may refer to:

== Technology ==
- Scanning tunneling microscope, a non-optical microscope
- Signature-tagged mutagenesis, a genetic technique to create random mutants
- STMicroelectronics, a manufacturer of electronics and semiconductors
- STM (Turkish company) (Savunma Teknolojileri Mühendislik ve Ticaret A.Ş.), a military technology company in Turkey
- STM-1, Synchronous Transport Module, the basic rate of transmission of the SDH ITU-T fiber optic network
- STM32, a family of 32-bit microcontroller integrated circuits by STMicroelectronics
- Software transactional memory, a method of handling concurrency in multithreaded systems
- Stepper motor, a type of electric motor
- Canon autofocus lenses that use stepper motor technology which makes them especially quiet
- .stm, a filename extension used by:
  - Web administration panel, of Belkin routers
  - Streaming Media File, in Microsoft Exchange Server
  - Scream Tracker, music tracker software
  - Server Side Includes, a server-side scripting language

== Transportation ==
- Société de transport de Montréal, the public transport provider in Montreal, Quebec, Canada
- Amtrak ticketing code for Stamford Transportation Center, a railway station in Stamford, Connecticut, US
- National Rail for St Michaels railway station in Liverpool, England, UK
- Sea traffic management, a set of systems and procedures to guide and monitor sea traffic in a manner similar to air traffic management
- Space traffic management
- Strategic Traffic Manager, a Bus Priority application designed to work as part of an intelligent transportation system
- Santarém-Maestro Wilson Fonseca Airport, Santarém, Pará|Santarém, Brazil, by IATA airport code
- St. Thomas Mount railway station, Chennai, Tamil Nadu, India, by station code
- Sydney Tramway Museum, New South Wales, Australia

== Publishing ==
- International Association of Scientific, Technical, and Medical Publishers, an association of publishers
- Science, technology, and medical publishing, a market segment of academic publishing
- Science Translational Medicine, an American medical journal

== Other uses ==
- Sacrae Theologiae Magister, or Master of Sacred Theology, an academic degree
- St Thomas College of Engineering and Technology, Kannur, Kerala, India
- St. Thomas More College, a Catholic, undergraduate, liberal arts college located in Saskatoon, Saskatchewan, Canada
- St. Thomas More Collegiate, a Catholic secondary school in Burnaby, British Columbia, Canada
- Short-term memory, the capacity for holding a small amount of information for a short period of time
- Small Tactical Munition, a weapon developed by Raytheon
- Stabilisation Tracking Mechanism, the mirror instrument of the Stabilisation and Association Process (SAP) for Kosovo
- ST"M, a Hebrew acronym meaning a scribe

== See also ==
- STM200, a pseudonym for Takeshi Matsumoto, musician featured in the music video game Dance Dance Revolution 5thMix
- STEM fields, an education and publishing classification
- ST1M a.k.a. Billy Milligan, real name Nikita Legostev, a Russian rapper
