= Southern Railway (U.S.) Class Ms-2 =

American 2-6-0 + 2-8-0 experimental locomotives

Southern Railway Ms-2 Class
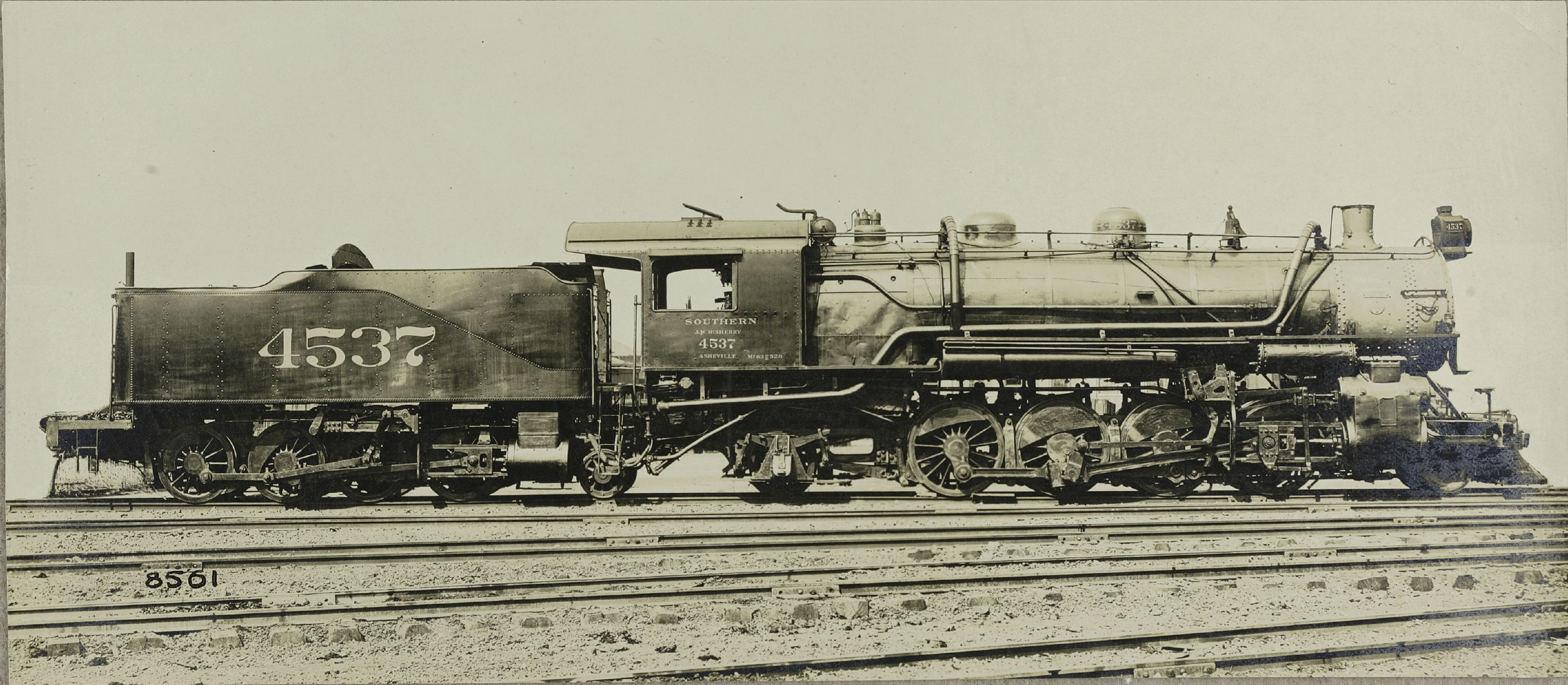
Type and origin
- Power type: Steam
Specifications
- Configuration
  - Whyte: 2-8-2+2-8-0 (Nos. 4535-4539, No. 4576); 2-8-2+2-6-0 (No. 4561); 2-10-2+2-6-2 (No. 5046)
- Gauge: 4 ft 8 1/2 in (1,435 mm)
- Fuel type: Coal
Career
- Operators: Southern Railway
- Class: Ms-2
- Locale: Southern United States

Southern Railway's Class Ms-2 was a type of experimental steam locomotive.

== History ==
Beginning in 1915, the Southern had the unique idea to fit "tractor engines" underneath the tender. These locomotives were used on the mountainous Asheville Division in North Carolina. They were similar to the Erie Railroad's "Triplex" 2-8-8-8-2 pusher locomotives, in that the rear set of driving wheels exhausted through a pipe on the rear of the tender. But there was not just one specific type of wheel arrangement. The Southern added 2-8-0 engines onto the Mikados #4535-4539 and #4576, but they added a 2-6-0 unit to the #4561. In 1918 an additional locomotive was modified, when a 2-6-2 tender engine was added to 2-10-2 #5046. They did not produce good enough results, and the tractor units were removed from the Mikados in 1923, and from #5046 in 1926, and were replaced by standard tenders. The locomotives continued service until the early 1950s.

An obvious problem with this arrangement is that, similar to the Garratt locomotive and the Triplex, as the tender coal and water ran out, the traction decreased. Additionally, the tender engines were too large for the steam generating capacity of the locomotive's boiler. The ultimate solution to this problem was the booster engine, which became common in the later 1920s.
