= Morane-Saulnier MS.221 =

French fighter aircraft

MS.221
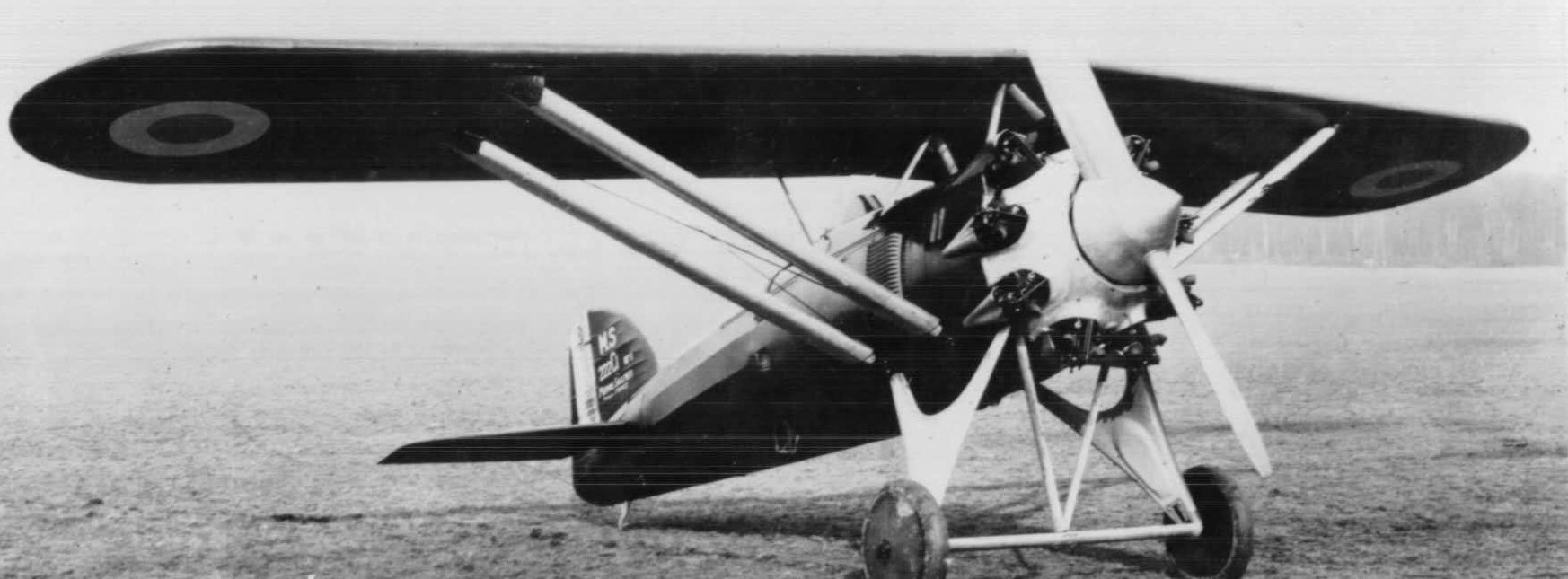
- MS.222

General information
- Type: Single seat light fighter aircraft
- National origin: France
- Manufacturer: Morane-Saulnier
- Number built: 2

History
- First flight: Early 1928

The Morane-Saulnier MS.221 was a French fighter aircraft, built in 1928 to compete for a government contract in the "Jockey" (light fighter) programme. Two were built, one of which was progressively modified to increase its speed, but in 1930 the light fighter concept was abandoned.

== Development ==
In the late 1920s both France and the UK explored the possibilities of light fighters, with lower power and light armament but with rapid climb and long endurance. They were also less costly to build. The Jockey programme, as it became known, began in France in 1926 and Morane-Saulnier responded with the 1927 MS.121. This proved to be underpowered and was superseded by the MS.221, which used the same basic airframe and armament with a 30% power increase, provided by a 450 kW (600 hp) Gnome-Rhône 9Ae Jupiter nine-cylinder radial engine. Two MS.221 prototypes were built.

The precise date of the MS.221's first flight, flown by Fronval, is not known but it was before March 1928. Despite being lighter and more powerful, it was significantly slower at altitude than its competitors, so one MS.221 prototype was re-engined with a turbo-supercharged Gnome-Rhône 9As Jupiter which could deliver full power at 3,800 m (12,500 ft). The wing struts were also revised to reduce drag. It was then re-designated as the MS.222.

The MS.222 climbed faster than the MS.221 but was still slow at altitude, so a further aerodynamic clean-up in 1930 replaced the cross-axle undercarriage inherited from the MS.121 with a split-axle design, resulting in the MS.223 which first flew in April 1930.

By this time the failure of the "Jockey" programme was apparent and Morane-Saulnier turned their attention back to heavier, more traditional fighters.

== Design ==
The parasol wing was in two parts, each with constant chord out to semi-circular tips and mounted with 7° of sweep but no dihedral. Each part had two duralumin spars and wooden ribs and was fabric covered apart from the leading edge which was strengthened with plywood. Narrow-chord ailerons occupied the entire trailing edge; as well as the normal, differential action for lateral control they could be operated together as camber-increasing flaps for landing. The joint between the two panels was supported over the central fuselage on a cabane of two inverted V-struts, one to each spar. Two almost parallel struts braced the wing at about 55% span to the lower fuselage.

The Jupiter engines used were similarly installed on all variants under a dished cowling with piston heads exposed for cooling. The fighter's 265 L (58 imp gal; 70 US gal) fuel tank was separated from the engine by a firewall and could be dropped in an emergency. Behind, the fuselage was of mixed construction; the forward main frames were metal but the structure further aft had wooden longerons and frames, with formers and stringers shaping its fabric covered, polygonal section. The front of the single, open cockpit was under the trailing edge behind a pair of fuselage-mounted Vickers or Darne machine guns firing through the propeller disc.

The tail surfaces had dural frames and were fabric covered. The tailplane, mounted at mid-fuselage and swept in plan, was in-flight adjustable, with split, unbalanced elevators which were narrow and had constant chord. The fighter's fin was quadrantal in profile and carried an unbalanced rudder that reached down to the keel, moving in a gap between the elevators.

The MS.221 and 222 had similar fixed landing gear to the MS.121, with its mainwheels on half-axles mounted centrally on a fixed transverse V-strut from the lower fuselage and their outer ends supported by dural-faired legs with multiple rubber ring shock absorbers from the lower longerons. The track was 1.96 m (77 in). Both variants had steerable tailskids to assist ground handling.

In place of the cross-axle and its support, the MS.223 had simpler longitudinal V-struts, and each wheel had a vertical shock absorber leg to a reinforced forward wing strut.

== Variants ==
MS.221
Two built.
MS.222
One MS.221 re-engined with supercharger and modified struts.
MS.223
MS.222 with cleaner, split-axle undercarriage.

== Specifications (MS.222) ==
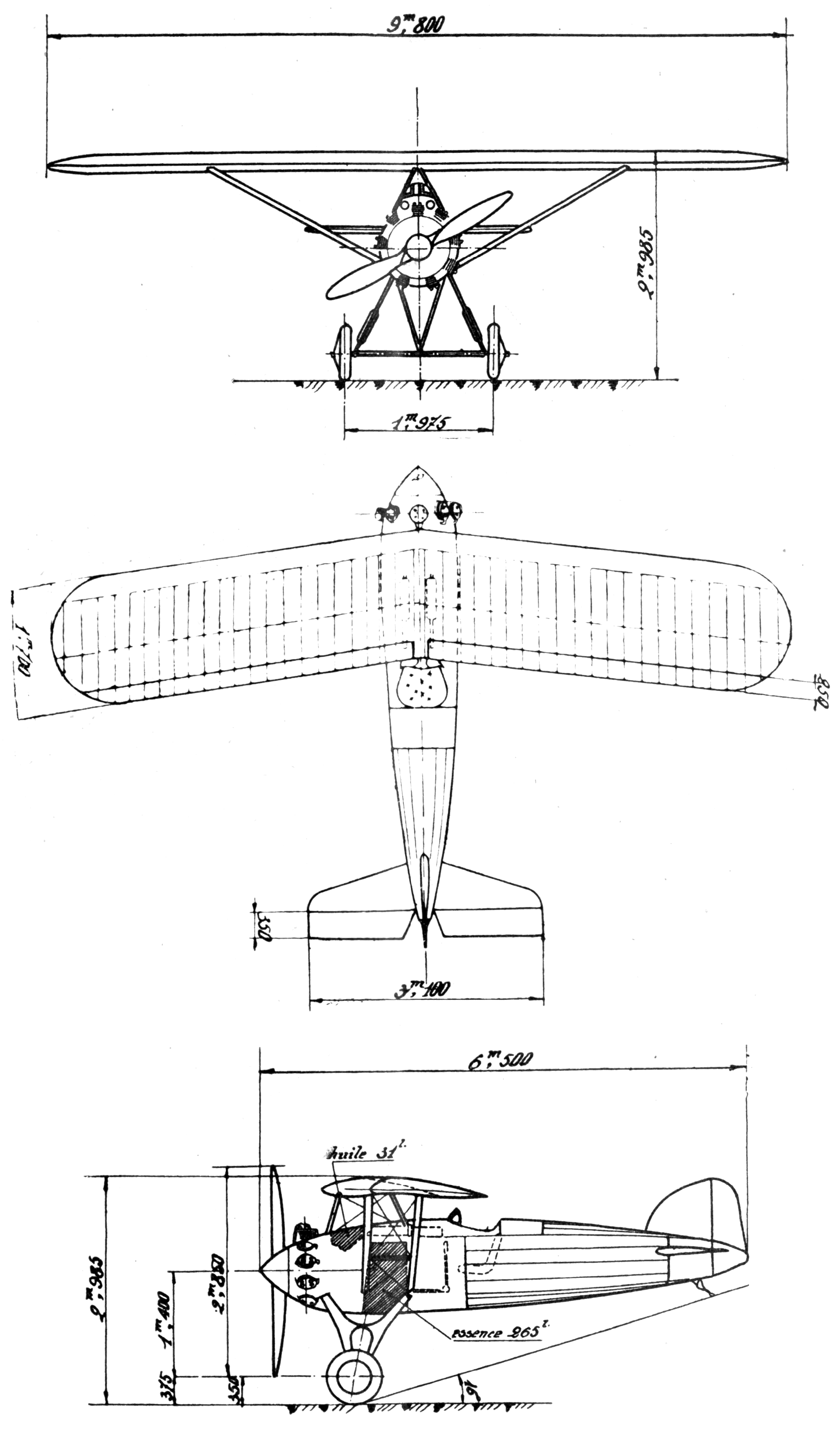
Morane-Saulnier MS.221 3-view drawing from L'Air April 1, 1928

Data from Les Ailes, June 1929 except where noted.

General characteristics

- Crew: One
- Length: 6.50 m (21 ft 4 in)
- Wingspan: 9.80 m (32 ft 2 in)
- Height: 2.98 m (9 ft 9 in)
- Wing area: 16 m^{2} (170 sq ft)
- Empty weight: 947 kg (2,088 lb)
- Gross weight: 1,255 kg (2,767 lb)
- Fuel capacity: 265 L (58 imp gal; 70 US gal)
- Powerplant: 1 × Gnome-Rhône 9As turbo-supercharged 9-cylinder radial, 450 kW (600 hp) with full boost at 3,800 m (12,500 ft)
- Propellers: 2-bladed, 2.85 m (9 ft 4 in) diameter wooden

Performance

- Maximum speed: 267 km/h (166 mph, 144 kn) at 3,650 m (11,980 ft), 288 km/h (179 mph; 156 kn) at sea level
- Range: 1,125 km (699 mi, 607 nmi)
- Endurance: 5 hr
- Service ceiling: 12,000 m (39,000 ft) absolute
- Time to altitude: 12 min to 7,000 m (23,000 ft)

Armament

- Guns: 2×7.7 mm (0.303 in) Vickers or Darne machine guns, provided with 700 rounds.

== Bibliography ==
- Bruner, Georges (1977). "Fighters a la Francaise, Part One". Air Enthusiast (3): 85–95. ISSN 0143-5450.
