= CAMIVA =

French company

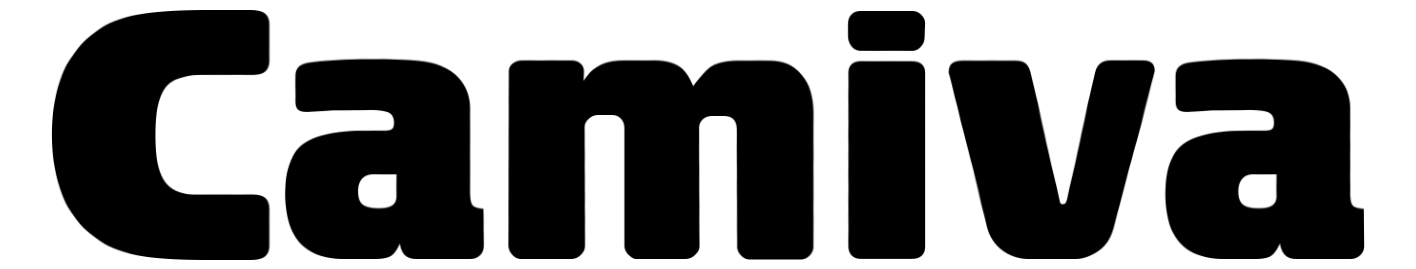
- Camiva logo (Iveco Magirus)
- Formation: 1873; 153 years ago
- Type: Fire apparatus manufacturer
- Headquarters: Chambéry, Saint-Alban-Leysse, France
- Parent organization: Berliet; Renault; Iveco; Magirus
- Website: http://www.camiva.com/ Camiva

CAMIVA, an initialism for Constructeurs Associés de Matériels d'Incendie, Voirie et Aviation, (English for Associated Constructors of Fire Roads and Aviation Equipments) is a French company which specializes in equipment for fire and rescue founded in 1970, near Chambéry, in Saint-Alban-Leysse in the department of Savoie, France.

== History ==
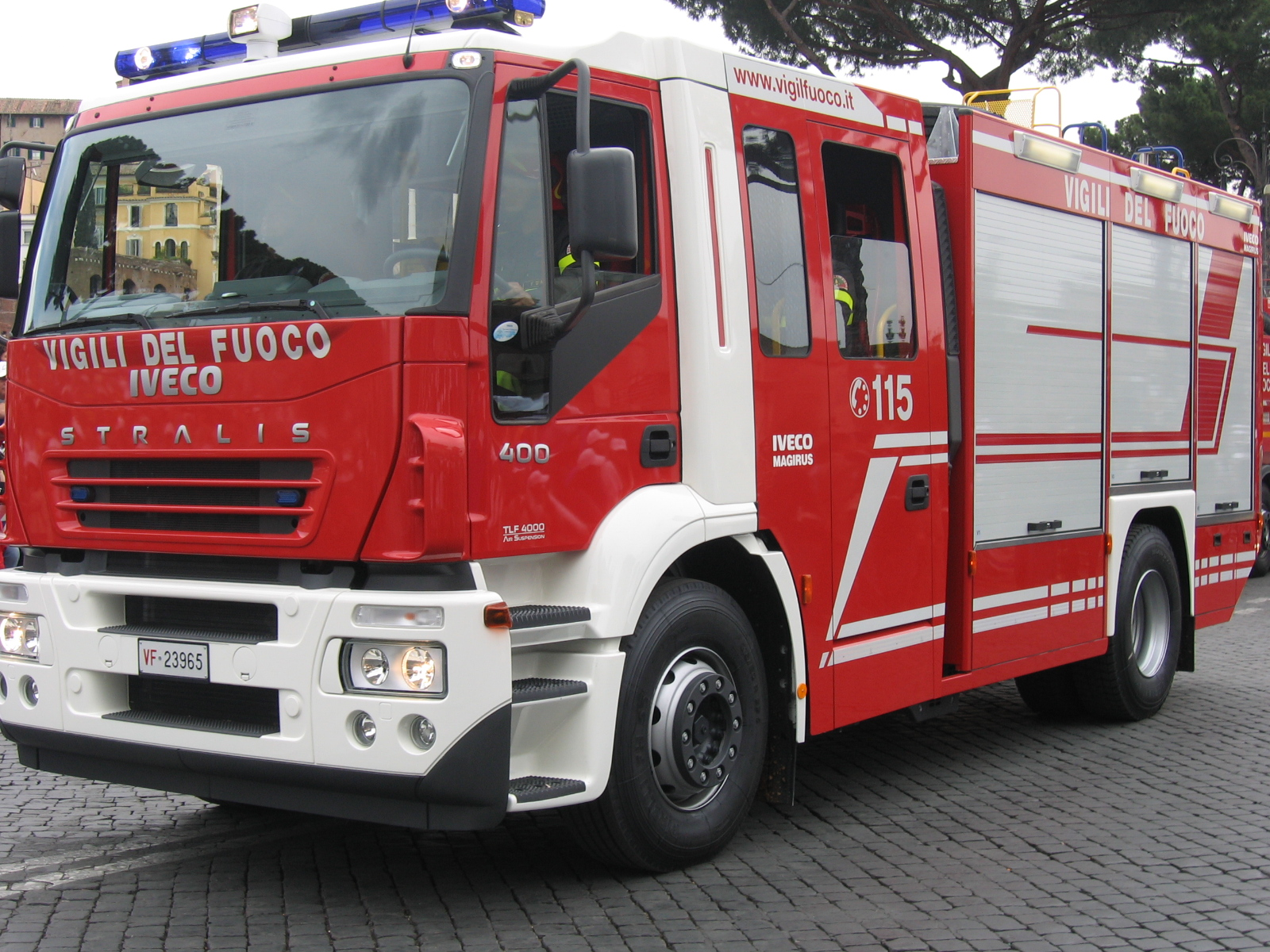
Italian Fire Service Iveco Magirus Eurofire Stralis AT400

CAMIVA took over the activities of the company Guinard Fire, then it is purchased by the automaker Berliet. In 1978, Camiva is included in the Renault Group after the reunification of Berliet and Saviem. In 1997, the group includes Camiva International Fiat - Iveco and becomes a component of its subsidiary Iveco Magirus, a world specialist equipment to fight against the fire.

== Figures ==
Turnover: 60 Million € (in 1987 it is estimated at 156 million F) The CAMIVA plant has a size of 55,000 square metres (590,000 sq ft) and employs 220 people.

== Products ==
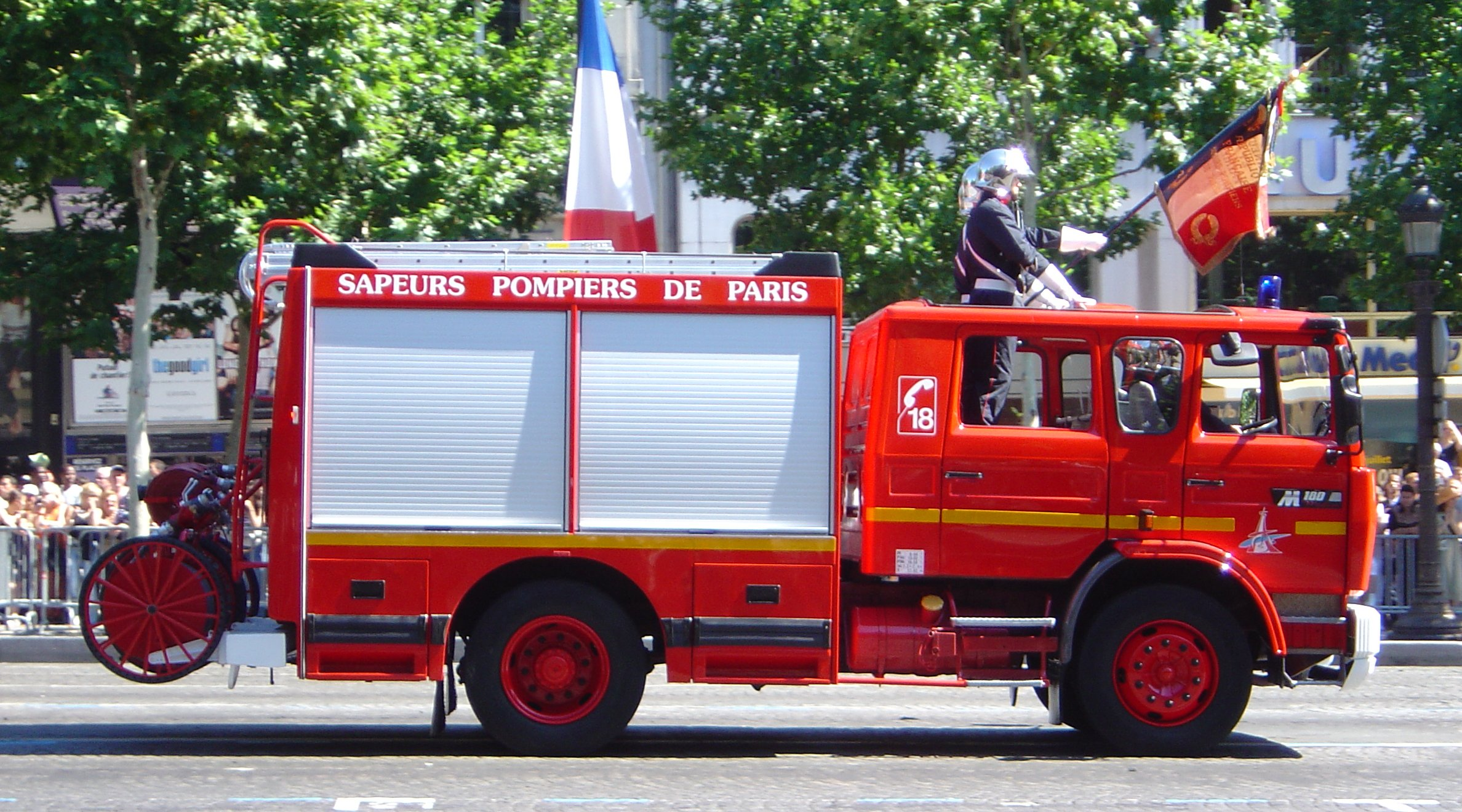
Renault based CAMIVA Fire engine of the Paris Fire Brigade parading

CAMIVA produces the following range of fire apparatus available on Iveco and Renault truck chassis:

- Forest fire fighting vehicles - 4x4 medium and large forest fire fighting vehicles, and large and forest fire fighting vehicle
- Rural and urban vehicles - 4x2, 4x4, 6x4, and 6x6 water tenders, combined road rescue and fire fighting vehicle, small water tenders, small combined road rescue and fire fighting vehicles, First intervention vehicles, off road water tenders, and road rescue vehicles.
- Turnable ladders and hydraulic platforms - 25 meter and 30 meter Turnable ladder with sequential movements, 25 meter and 30 meter Automatic turnable ladder with combined movements.
- Industrial Fire vehicles - Large capacity foam tenders, General fire fighting vehicles, and Petrochemical refinery foam tenders.
- Airport vehicles - Rapid intervention vehicles, and Type 60 and 90 Crash tenders.
- Intervention vehicles - Tunnel fire fighting and rescue vehicles, tunnel rescue shuttles, crowd control vehicle, Hose layer unit, Rescue units, Transport units, Large extinguishing units, and Water and foam units.
