= MS =

MS, ms, Ms, M.S., etc. may refer to:

== Arts and entertainment ==
- Ms. (magazine), an American feminist magazine
- Metal Storm (webzine), a heavy metal website based in Estonia

== Businesses and organizations ==
- MS-13, criminal gang
- Młodzi Socjaliści (Young Socialists), a former Polish socialist youth organization
- Morgan Stanley, a US investment bank (NYSE stock symbol: MS)
- Mjólkursamsalan, an Icelandic dairy company
- Microsoft, an American multinational corporation and technology company
- Motorola Solutions, an American communications equipment manufacturer

== Educational qualifications ==
- Master of Science, a master's degree in the field of science
- Master of Surgery, an advanced medical degree
- Master Sommelier, a terminal degree in the field of wine
- Mastère spécialisé, a French postgraduate grande école master's degree

== Medicine ==
- Mitral stenosis, narrowing of the mitral valve of the heart
- Morphine sulfate, an opiate pain-relieving drug
- Multiple sclerosis, a disease of the nervous system

== Military ==
- Master seaman, a non-commissioned member rank of the Canadian Navy
- Mess Management Specialist, a former U.S. Navy occupational rating now covered by culinary specialist

== Places ==
- Mato Grosso do Sul, Brazil, postal code MS
- Mississippi, a U.S. state, official abbreviation
- Montserrat, Caribbean island nation (ISO 3166-2 country code: MS)

== Religion ==
- Missionaries of La Salette, a Catholic male religious congregation

== Science and technology ==
=== Computing ===
- .ms, the top level Internet domain for Montserrat in the Caribbean
- Master System, a third-generation video game console produced by Sega
- Microsoft, an American-based global software company
- Mobile station, a piece of equipment for communication with a mobile network

=== Units of measure ===
- Megasiemens (MS), and millisiemens (mS), multiples of the unit of electric conductance siemens
- Metre per second (m/s), a unit of velocity (speed)
- Metre second (m s), a unit of absement (sustained displacement of an object)
- Millisecond (ms), and megasecond (Ms), multiples of the unit of time second

=== Other uses in science and technology ===
- Surface-wave magnitude (M_{s}), a seismic scale
- Solar mass (M_{S}), an alternate symbol to M_{☉}
- Mass spectrometry, a method of determining the chemical composition or exact mass of molecules
- Master of Science, a postgraduate university master's degree
- Mesylate, a chemical salt
- Spin quantum number, $m_s$

== Transportation ==
- Egyptair, by its IATA code "MS"
- Motor ship, ship prefix
- Chennai Egmore railway station, code MS

== Other uses ==
- Ms., a title for women providing no indication of marital status
- MS (cigarette), an Italian brand of cigarettes
- MS (satellite), a series of four Soviet satellites launched in 1962
- Malay language, of Southeast Asia (ISO 639-1 language code: ms)
- Manuscript, abbreviation (ms.) for a written or typed document
- Member of the Senedd (formerly Assembly Member), Welsh Parliament legislator
- Memoriae Sacrum (Latin for "Sacred to the Memory"), an epitaph
- Multan Sultans, a professional Twenty20 franchise cricket team in the Pakistan Super League

== See also ==
- M&S (disambiguation)
- M/S (disambiguation)
- M (disambiguation), including the singular of Ms
- S (disambiguation)
- SM (disambiguation)
- MSMS (disambiguation)
