= MG =

MG, Mg, or mg and variants may refer to:

== Arts ==
=== Entertainment ===
- MG, a character in The Perhapanauts comics
- Match Game, a television game show

=== Music ===
- Main gauche, "left hand" in piano playing
- MG (album), a 2015 album by Martin Gore
- The M.G.'s, from the band Booker T. & the M.G.'s
- The MG's (album), an album by the M.G.'s
- Mikael Gabriel, Finnish rapper
- M:G, real name Maribel Gonzalez, dance music singer
- MG Select, a house duo music production including George Jackson

== Military ==
- Machine gun (MG-), prefix for model designations, for example, "MG42"
- Major general, a military rank
- Medal for Gallantry, a military decoration

== Organizations ==
- MG Cars, an automotive marque of the now defunct MG Car Company
- MG Motor, a present-day car manufacturing company
  - JSW MG Motor India, Indian subsidiary of MG Motor
  - MG Motors Pakistan, Pakistani subsidiary of MG Motor
- Champion Air (IATA code)
- Matematička gimnazija, a school in Belgrade
- Monte Generoso railway

== Places ==
- Madagascar (ISO 3166-1 country code MG)
  - .mg, the Internet country code top-level domain for Madagascar
- Minas Gerais, Brazil
- Mongolia (FIPS 10-4 country code MG)

== Science and technology ==
- .mg, the Internet country code top-level domain for Madagascar
- Force of gravity, product of mass (m) by acceleration of gravity (g)
- MagicGate and OpenMG, encryption technologies of Sony
- Magnesium, a chemical element with symbol Mg
- Manual Gates, a type of level crossing used in the United Kingdom
- Microgrid, a local architecture for power grid within the concept of Smart Grid that can function both connected to and isolanded from the main grid.
- Motor–generator, a device for converting electrical power to another form

=== Biology and medicine ===
- Michaelis–Gutmann bodies, concentrically layered basophilic inclusions in the urinary tract
- Monoglyceride, or monoacylglycerol
- Myasthenia gravis, a neuromuscular disease
- Mycoplasma gallisepticum, a disease affecting chickens and other birds
- Mycoplasma genitalium, a sexually transmitted bacterium
- Marker gene, a gene which can be used to find taxonomic lineages, or a gene used to find if a DNA sequence has been inserted into an organism

=== Units of measurement ===
- Megagauss (MG), equal to 100 teslas
- Megagram (Mg), equal to 10^{6} grams, commonly known as the tonne
- Milligauss (mG), equal to 10^{−7} teslas
- Milligram (mg), equal to 10^{−3} grams
- Morgen (Mg), equal to 2,500 square meters

== Other uses ==
- Mg (magazine), an American business monthly
- Malagasy language
- Matt Groening
- Outlaw motorcycle club (motorcycle gang)

== See also ==
- GM (disambiguation)
- ΜG (Mu-G), microgravity
- Μg (mu-G), microgram
- UG (disambiguation) for some uses of μG/ΜG (MU-G)
