= UoG =

UoG is an abbreviation that can mean:

- University of Gdańsk
- University of Georgia
- University of Ghana
- University of Ghent
- University of Glamorgan
- University of Glasgow
- University of Gloucestershire
- University of Goroka
- University of Greenwich
- University of Guadalajara
- University of Guam
- University of Guelph
- University of Gujrat
- University of Guyana

== See also ==
- GU (disambiguation)
- UG (disambiguation)
- U of G (disambiguation)
