= Microg =

Microg, microG, or, Micro-G may refer to:

- microgravity (micro G, microG), weightlessness, zero-gee
- MicroG, an open source replacement for Google software libraries
- Micro g-string (micro-g), a type of garment used as underpants and beachwear, a variant of the g-string
- microgram (microg, ug, μg), 1000th of a gramme, an SI unit of measurement for mass
- Micro-g, a brand of gravimeter

== See also ==
- G (disambiguation)
- UG (disambiguation)
