= Ugh =

Ugh or UGH may refer to:

- Ugh! (video game), a 1992 video game
- "Ugh!" (song), by The 1975
- "Ugh" (SpongeBob SquarePants), a 2004 TV episode
- "Ugh! Your Ugly Houses!," a 1995 single by British alternative music band Chumbawamba
- "Ugh Ugh Ugh", a song by rapper Juicy J from his 2009 album Hustle Till I Die

== See also ==
- UG (disambiguation)
- UGG (disambiguation)
