= Gerald Charles =

Swiss watch company

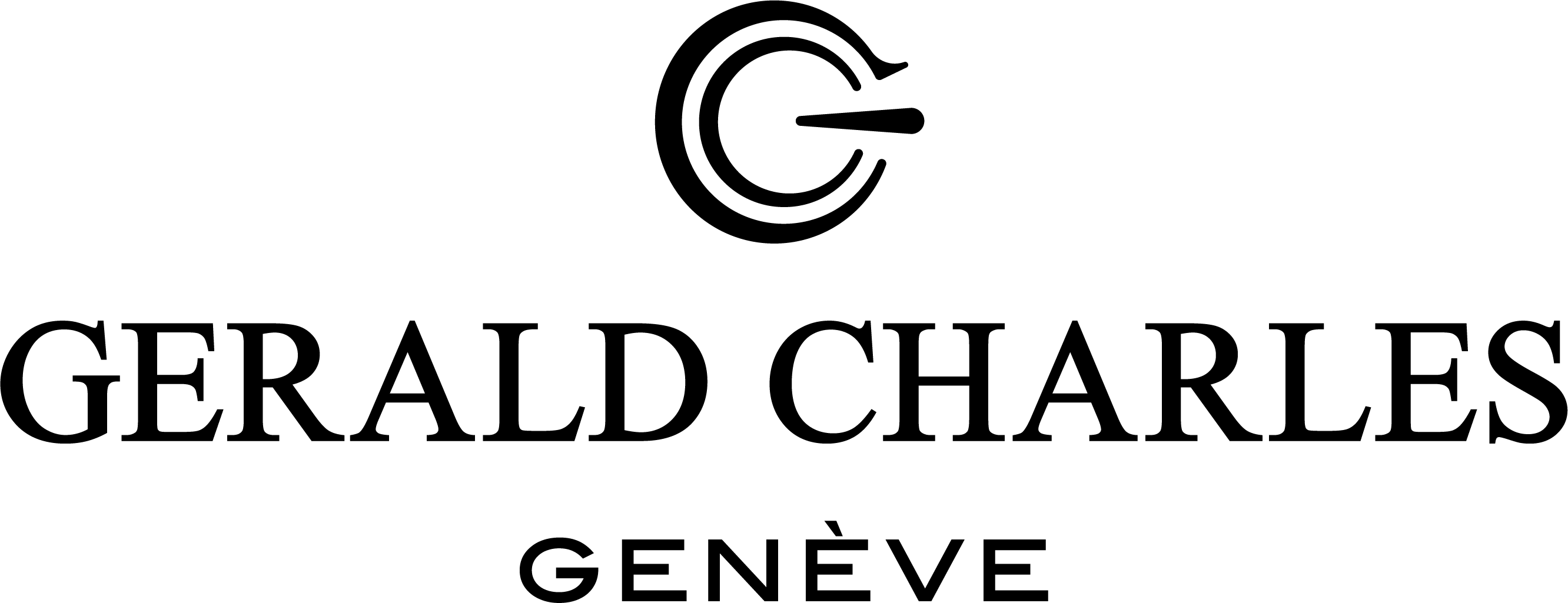
- Industry: Luxury good
- Founded: 2000
- Founder: Gérald Genta
- Headquarters: Switzerland
- Key people: Federico Ziviani (CEO); Franco Ziviani (chairman)
- Products: Watches
- Website: www.geraldcharles.com

Gerald Charles SA is an independent family-owned watch company based in Switzerland, founded by Swiss watchmaker and artist Gérald Charles Genta.

== History ==
=== Foundation ===
Gérald Charles Genta (1931–2011), a Swiss watchmaker and artist, founded his eponymous company in 1969, which was sold by Genta in 1996 to The Hour Glass. In 2000, Gérald Charles Genta founded a new watch brand, Gerald Charles SA. Gérald Charles Genta is one of the most important designers in watchmaking history best known for creating icons such as the Audemars Piguet Royal Oak and the Patek Philippe Nautilus. He also collaborated with watch manufacturers, such as Omega, IWC, and Cartier, contributing to models like Omega's Constellation and Cartier's Pasha de Cartier.

=== Early years ===
In 2000 Gérald Charles Genta founded Gerald Charles, a brand that bore both his first names, establishing a connection between himself and his creations.

In 2003 Gérald Charles Genta entrusted the Maison to the Ziviani family, who were already distributors of Genta's watches and had a collaborative history with him. Gérald Genta continued to serve as the Chief Designer giving his creativity complete freedom of expression until his passing in 2011, and Giampaolo Ziviani assumed the role of the company's CEO.

Between 2011 and 2018 the company focused on creating bespoke timepieces for a selected group of collectors, using original designs originated by Genta.

=== Recent history ===
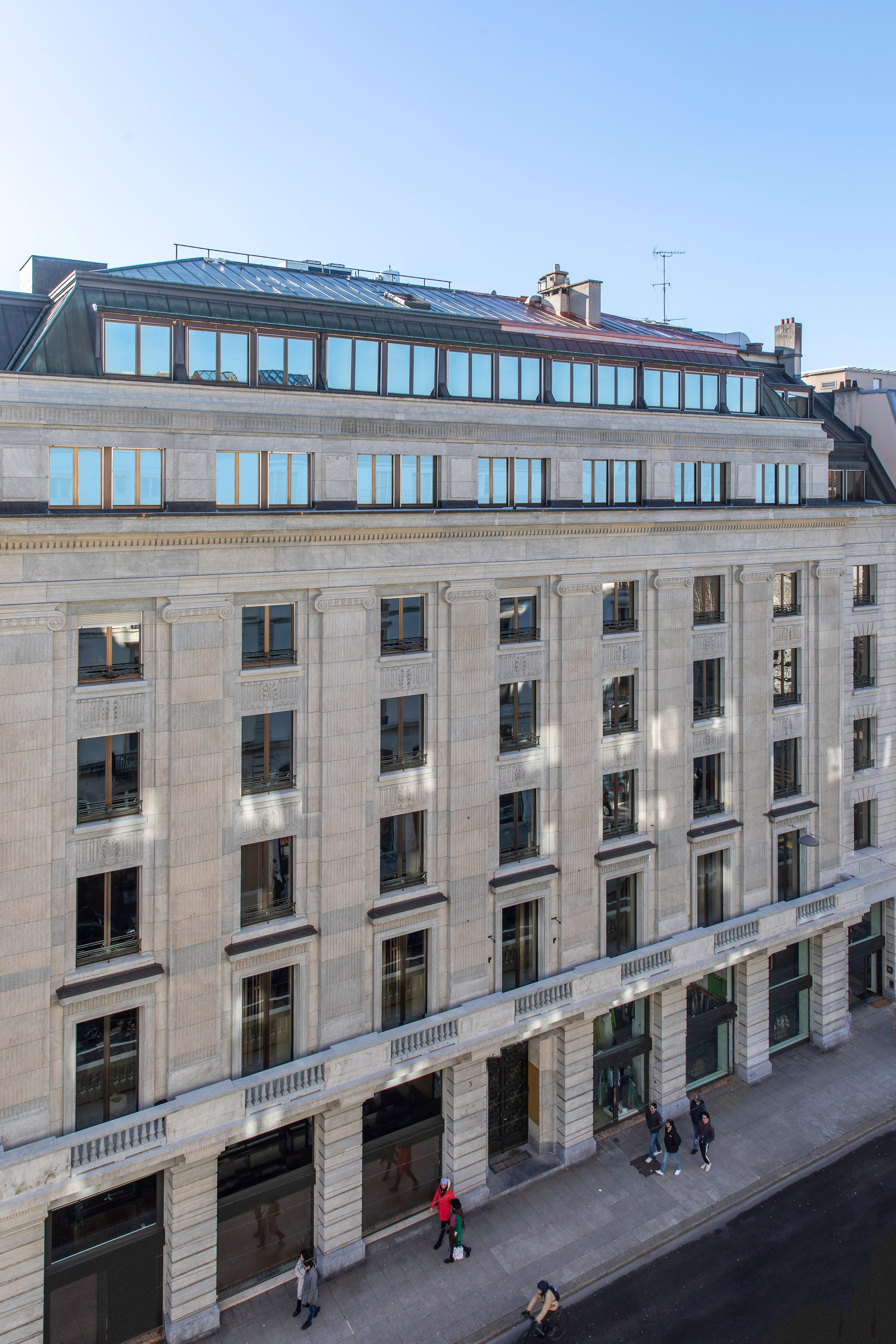
Gerald Charles Atelier Genève in Rue du Mont-Blanc 3, Geneva

In 2019 Federico Ziviani joined the brand as CEO and the company started to expand internationally.

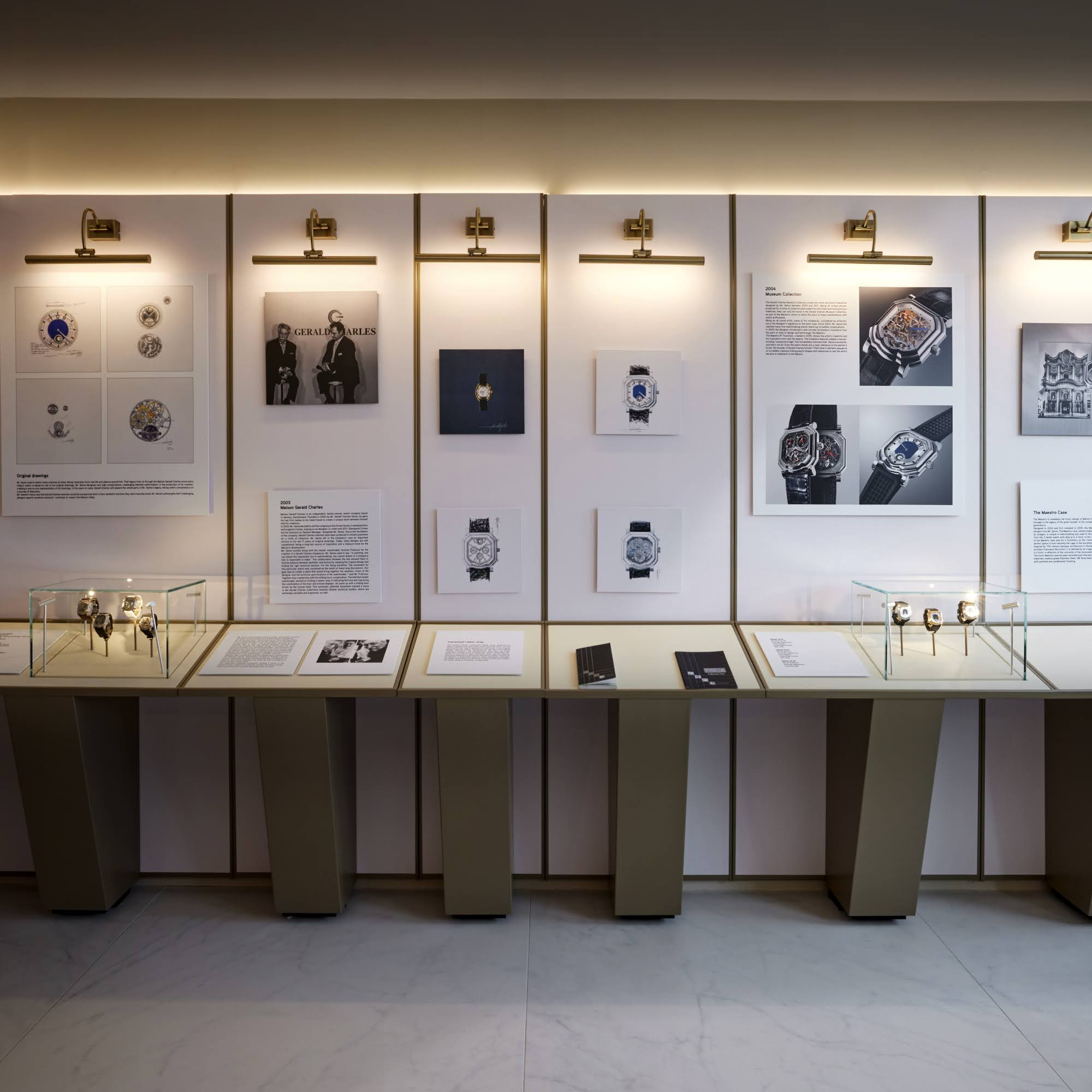
Gerald Charles Museum in the brand's Atelier in Geneva

The brand chose to maintain the Maestro case, an octagonal design originated by Genta in 2005, while implementing some design modifications to make the watches available to a wider audience. The Maestro case variations were redesigned by the creative director Octavio Garcia and featured diverse dials, a skeletonized style, and rubber straps in colors like blue and green. Garcia, with a significant background in watch design, brought his expertise to Gerald Charles. Having spent 11 years at Audemars Piguet (AP), including five years as its Chief Artistic Officer, Garcia is widely regarded as a prominent figure in the industry, often seen as the successor to Gerald Genta's legacy in terms of design innovation.

In 2020 Gerald Charles released the Maestro Anniversary, inspired by Gérald Genta's 2005 Maestro design. This limited edition saw a successful sell-out of its 252 stainless steel pieces.

In 2021 the "Premier 2021" chronograph and three hands watches have been launched in a limited edition of 25 pieces each.

In May 2021 Gerald Charles introduced the Maestro 2.0 Automatic in Stainless Steel.

In 2022 Gerald Charles launched the new Maestro 8.0 Squelette watch featuring an ultra-thin, iconic Maestro case with an open-worked movement and 100 meters water resistance.

In 2023 Gerald Charles introduced the GC 9.0 Tourbillon Ref. GC9.0-A-01, a tribute to founder Gerald Charles Genta, featuring a 60-seconds Titanium flying tourbillon cage.

In April 2024 Gerald Charles took part for the first time at Watches and Wonders at the Palexpo in Geneva, the most important watch fair in the world. The company was one of the 6 new entrants to the event and showcased the Masterlink collection for the first time. For the occasion, Gerald Charles opened the door of its Atelier in Geneva, situated in Rue du Mont-Blanc 3, where the permanent museum of Gérald Charles Genta was presented. The museum is house to hundreds of original sketches along with unique pieces created by Genta.

In 2025, during its 25th anniversary year, Gerald Charles presented the Maestro GC39 25th Anniversary Edition at Watches and Wonders Geneva. As part of the Watches and Wonders "In the City" program, the company also opened the Gerald Charles archives to the public for the first time at its Geneva museum and atelier.

Later in 2025, Gerald Charles participated in Dubai Watch Week 2025, where it presented a selection of archival material from its Geneva museum for the first time outside Switzerland.

In 2026, Gerald Charles returned to Watches and Wonders with high complications: the Masterlink Perpetual Calendar, described by the press as the brand's most complex watch since its modern relaunch. Following the dream of Gérald Charles Genta, the Maison also presented the Mini Maestro, a watch dedicated to a feminine public and inspired by a unique piece of the artist. With interchangeable straps, an easy-release system and a total of 66 diamonds, this watch is a reinterpretation of the Maestro silhouette in a more refined and delicate form.

== Market impact ==
In 2023, Gerald Charles expanded its presence to North Europe and the USA through the establishment of new retail locations.

On January 30, 2024 Office Mugino and Gerald Charles announced a partnership at the Swiss Ambassador's residence in Japan and launched Gerald Charles' distribution in Japan.

In February 2024 Gerald Charles opened its first boutique and showroom in Geneva on Rue du Mont-Blanc.

In 2025, Gerald Charles expands to Hong Kong and Singapore with new retailer partnerships.

In December 2025, the company opened its first directly managed boutique in Japan, at JR Nagoya Takashimaya Watch Maison in Nagoya.

== Collections ==
Gerald Charles watches are manufactured in Switzerland and are based on original designs by Gérald Genta.

The Maestro collection, first introduced in 2005, is the signature line of Gerald Charles. It is characterized by an asymmetrical case with a rippled bezel and a vulcanised rubber strap, based on an original design by Gérald Genta.

The design of the Maestro case was inspired by a 17th-century Roman architectural element by Francesco Borromini. It combines geometric elements derived from both a square and an octagon and features a distinctive curved profile at 6 o’clock, referred to as a “smile”, echoing the concave forms of Baroque architecture.

Models in the Maestro collection are produced in materials including stainless steel, 18K rose gold and Grade 5 titanium, with finishes combining polished and sandblasted surfaces.

In recent years, the Maestro collection has been expanded with additional variations, including the Mini Maestro, a smaller-sized version of the original design.

In 2024, Gerald Charles introduced the Masterlink collection, featuring an integrated bracelet design.

In 2026, the brand expanded the Masterlink line with the introduction of the Masterlink Perpetual Calendar, marking its entry into more complex mechanical watchmaking.

== Sport Partnerships ==
Gerald Charles has developed associations with a range of sports, particularly tennis, where professional ATP players have competed while wearing models from the brand’s GC Sport collection, including at the beginning Hubert Hurkacz, Andrea Vavassori and Tim van Rijthoven and then adding other passionate players wearing Gerald Charles watches such as Alex de Minaur and Daria Kasatkina.

The company has also partnered with British cricketer Sam Curran and acknowledged his performance following England’s victory at the ICC Men's T20 World Cup in 2022.

In addition to its involvement in tennis, Gerald Charles has supported international tournaments, serving as official timekeeper for events such as the Austrian Open Kitzbühel and the Kooyong Classic in Melbourne.

As of 2023, the company is a member of the Fondation de la Haute Horlogerie (FHH) and Watches and Culture.

In 2026, Australian tennis player Alex de Minaur became a brand ambassador for Gerald Charles. A top-10 ATP player, he represents the brand in competition and has been associated with performance-oriented models from the GC Sport collection.

Beyond tennis, the brand has expanded its presence in other sports. In golf, Gerald Charles has collaborated with Italian professional golfer Renato Paratore. In football, former Italian international midfielder Claudio Marchisio has been associated with the brand as a friend of the brand.

In 2026, Gerald Charles further extended its sporting partnerships by becoming the official timekeeper of the EA7 World Legends Padel Tour, an international circuit featuring former professional football players competing in padel events worldwide, and by adding Gemma Triay to its wall of fame, world No. 1 in the women's padel rankings.
