= GM =

GM, Gm, g_{m}, or similar may refer to:

== Places ==
- The Gambia, by ISO 3166 code
- Germany, by FIPS 10-4 country code
- Greater Manchester, North West England

== Sports and gaming ==
- Gunn & Moore, British sports equipment company
- RGM-79 GM, a mobile suit series in the video game Mobile Suit Gundam
- Grandmaster (chess), the highest chess title awarded by FIDE
- Gamemaster or game master, a person officiating in a multiplayer role-playing game
- GM – The Independent Fantasy Roleplaying Magazine

== Arts, computing, and electronics ==
- G minor, chords and scale in music
- General MIDI (GM or GM 1), a standardized specification for Musical Instrument Digital Interface synthesizers, developed by the American MIDI Manufacturers Association (MMA) and the Japan MIDI Standards Committee (JMSC) and first published in 1991
- GraphicsMagick, a fork of ImageMagick
- Golden master, a stage in the software release life cycle, referring to a version to be distributed to customers, i.e. ready for release to manufacturing (RTM)
- g_{m}, the notation for mutual conductance or transconductance (short for transfer conductance), an electronic component parameter

== Transportation ==
- Google Maps, a web mapping service that can compute routes between places
- General Motors, American automobile manufacturing company, founded September 16, 1908
  - 2009–2011: Motors Liquidation Company
- Zhejiang Geely Ming Industrial Co., Ltd. (Chinese: 浙江吉铭实业有限公司, common known as GM Motor), a motorcycle manufacturer founded in 1995
- GM chassis or Gusenichnaya Machina, a Russian tracked vehicle chassis
- Metacentric height, the distance between the center of gravity (G) and the metacenter (M) of a ship

== Biology, agriculture, and food ==
- Genital mutilation
- Genetic modification (adjective: genetically modified), manipulation of an organism's genome
- Silty gravel, in the Unified Soil Classification System
- General Mills, American food manufacturing company
- GM Sugar Uganda Limited

== Particle physics and metrology ==
- Geiger–Müller tube or G-M tube, a type of radiation detector
- GM, a unit of two-photon absorption cross-section, named after Maria Goeppert Mayer
- Gigametre or gigameter (Gm), one billion metres
- Gram or gramme (historically sometimes abbreviated "gm", but now usually "g"), a metric unit of mass

== Other uses in academia, science, and mathematics ==
- Grand Marshal (RPI), the highest elected student leader of Rensselaer Polytechnic Institute
- Grant-maintained school, a kind of state school in England and Wales, 1988–1998
- Göttinger Miszellen, a scientific journal published by the Seminar für Ägyptologie und Koptologie (seminar for Egyptology and Coptology) of the University of Göttingen, Germany
- Standard gravitational parameter $\mu=GM \$
- The multiplicative group scheme, denoted G_{m}

== Other uses ==
- Gm (digraph), pair of letters used in English for certain Greek words
- General manager in business
- George Medal, a UK, primarily civil, decoration for acts of great bravery
- Gunner's mate, a US Navy rating

== See also ==
- GM1, a ganglioside in brain biochemistry
- GM-1 (German: Göring Mischung 1), a system for injecting nitrous oxide into aircraft engines that was used by the Luftwaffe in World War II
- Grandmaster (disambiguation)
- Good morning (disambiguation)
- MG (disambiguation)
- G (disambiguation)
- M (disambiguation)
