= U of G =

U of G may refer to:

== Africa ==
- University of Ghana, Ghana

== Americas ==
- University of Guadalajara, Mexico
- University of Guelph, Canada
- University of Georgia, U.S.
- University of Guam, in the U.S. territory of Guam
- University of Guyana, Guyana

== Europe ==
- University of Gdańsk, Poland
- University of Ghent, Belgium
- University of Glasgow, Scotland
- University of Graz, Austria

== See also ==
- GU (disambiguation)
- UG (disambiguation)
- UOG (disambiguation)
- UdeG (disambiguation); Romance languages: UofG "U of G"
