= Gérald Genta =

Swiss watch designer and artist

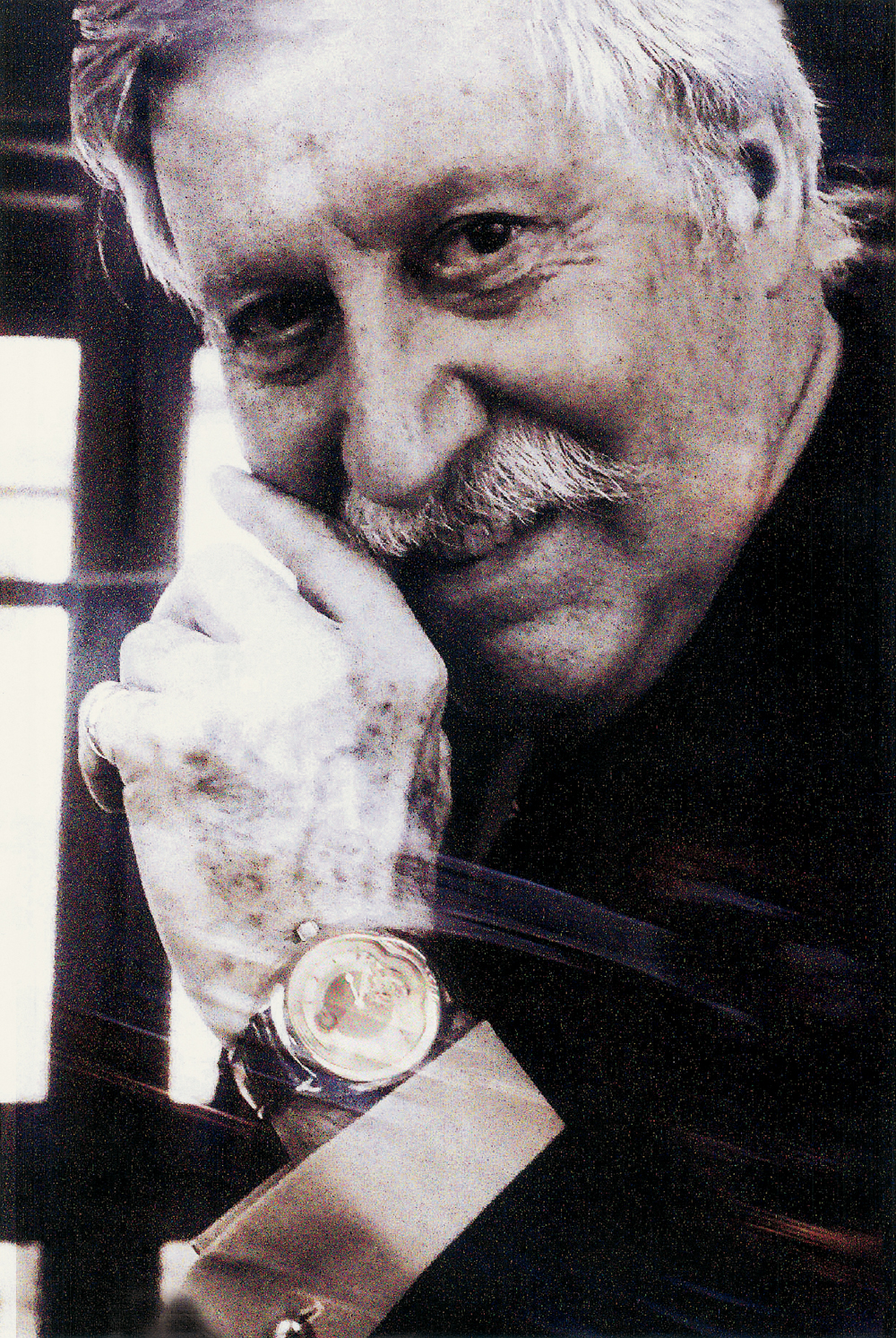
- Born: Gérald Charles Genta; 1 May 1931; Geneva, Switzerland
- Died: 17 August 2011 (aged 80)
- Occupations: Watchmaker, businessman, designer
- Years active: 1950–2011

Gérald Charles Genta (1 May 1931 – 17 August 2011) was a Swiss watchmaker and artist. He is known for his eponymous line of timepieces Gerald Genta, and his company Gerald Charles, as well as his design work with other high-end watch manufacturers, including IWC Schaffhausen, Omega, Universal Genève, Patek Philippe and Audemars Piguet. Genta created the Patek Philippe Nautilus and the Audemars Piguet Royal Oak, to date the best-selling models of both houses. In addition, at age 23, he designed the Universal Genève Polerouter, with the first commercially available Microrotor movement for SAS airlines. He is regarded as one of the most influential people in the history of horology.

Christie's auction house of New York has called Genta's work "the Fabergé of watches", while The Wall Street Journal has called them the "world's most complicated and pricey watches".

== Early life ==
Genta was born in Geneva to a Swiss mother and father of Piemonte (Northern Italian) descent. Genta grew up in modest circumstances. In 1939, when the Second World War began, his father was required by Swiss authorities to return to Italy, and the family moved to Turin. They later returned to Switzerland when Genta was fourteen years old. He left school early and took various jobs, including work as a cinema usher and delivery assistant. Between 1946 and 1950, he completed an apprenticeship at Ponti Gennari & Cie, a Geneva-based bracelet manufacturer. At age 20, Genta finished jewellery and goldsmith training in Switzerland, earning his Swiss Federal Diploma.

== Starting career with Universal Genève ==
Subsequently, Genta was recruited by Universal Genève SA, at the time one of the most recognized manufactures in both the U.S. and Europe for its chronograph models. After Universal Genève settled a patent dispute involving the micro-rotor caliber, Genta designed Universal's Polerouter Microtors in the 1950s, as well as the Golden and White Shadows during the mid-1960s. The Shadows contained a micro-rotor, unisonic and accutron movement, the latter two a result of the quartz crisis starting in the late 1960s.

== Notable watch designs ==
Genta's work with Universal would be a precursor to future collaborations with other brands in Switzerland and throughout Europe, including Omega's Constellation (1959); Patek Philippe's Golden Ellipse (1968). Audemars Piguet's Royal Oak (1970), IWC's Ingenieur (1976); Patek Philippe's Nautilus (1976); and Cartier's Pasha de Cartier (1985).

=== Audemars Piguet Royal Oak ===
One of Genta's most recognisable designs was that of the Audemars Piguet Royal Oak, which was considered to be the first luxury sports watch in the world. The watch was inspired by traditional diving helmets and therefore featured exposed screw heads as well as a unique case design. The watch also featured an integrated bracelet.

=== Patek Philippe Nautilus ===
In 1976, Patek Philippe introduced the Nautilus collection, designed by Genta, after deciding it was time to produce a high quality sport watch. The first model was Ref. 3700 and was made of steel. The Nautilus was released by Patek Philippe during the quartz crisis in the hope that it would help re-attract people's attention to high-end Swiss mechanical watches.

The Nautilus collection played a key role in meeting Patek Philippe's goal to refresh the brand image while perpetuating tradition. The target customer was the new generation of business managers. The Nautilus wristwatch has become one of the most successful collections from Patek Philippe, and the Ref. 5711 & 5712 models, which the company introduced in 2006 to celebrate the 30th anniversary of the collection, are among the most frequently purchased models.

=== IWC Schaffhausen Ingenieur SL "Jumbo" Ref.1832 ===
Designed by Gerald Genta in 1974 and manufactured by IWC Schaffhausen in 1976, the Ingenieur SL Automatic Ref. 1832 is considered one of the most sought-after watches in IWC's history. As part of IWC's SL collection of luxury steel sports watches launched in the 1970s, the timepiece became known and appreciated for both its strong aesthetic codes and technical refinements: rubber buffers absorbed heavy shocks and impacts, while a soft iron inner case protected the automatic movement caliber 8541 from strong magnetic fields. Due to its large size and an impressive case diameter of 40 mm, which was particularly unique for its time, the Ingenieur SL was soon known among watch aficionados as the “Jumbo”.

Gerald Genta created the Ingenieur SL during the quartz crisis, a challenging period for IWC and the entire watch industry. At that time, the watch manufacturer aimed at expanding its product portfolio to include more mechanical watches in stainless steel. Genta was commissioned to find a new visual identity for IWC's Ingenieur, the manufacturer's first anti-magnetic watch for civilian use developed in the 1950s. In his design of the new, robust Ingenieur model in stainless steel, Genta successfully highlighted its distinctive technical character. The watch's integrated H-link bracelet, structured dial and, above all, the screw-on bezel with five recesses became the Ingenieur SL's trademark features.

== Eponymous brand & Designs ==
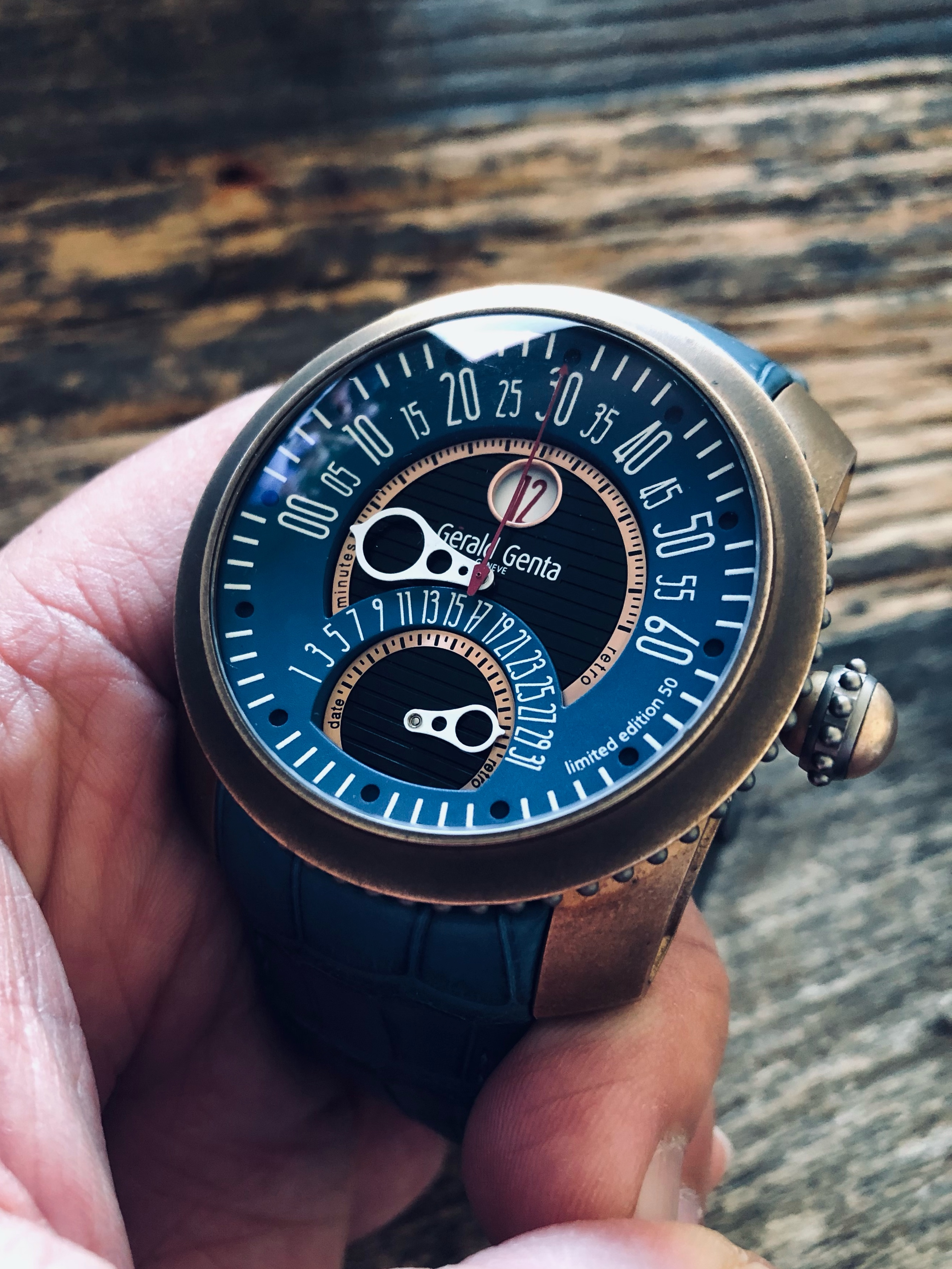
Gerald Genta Gefica Biretro Safari Re-edition Blue Note

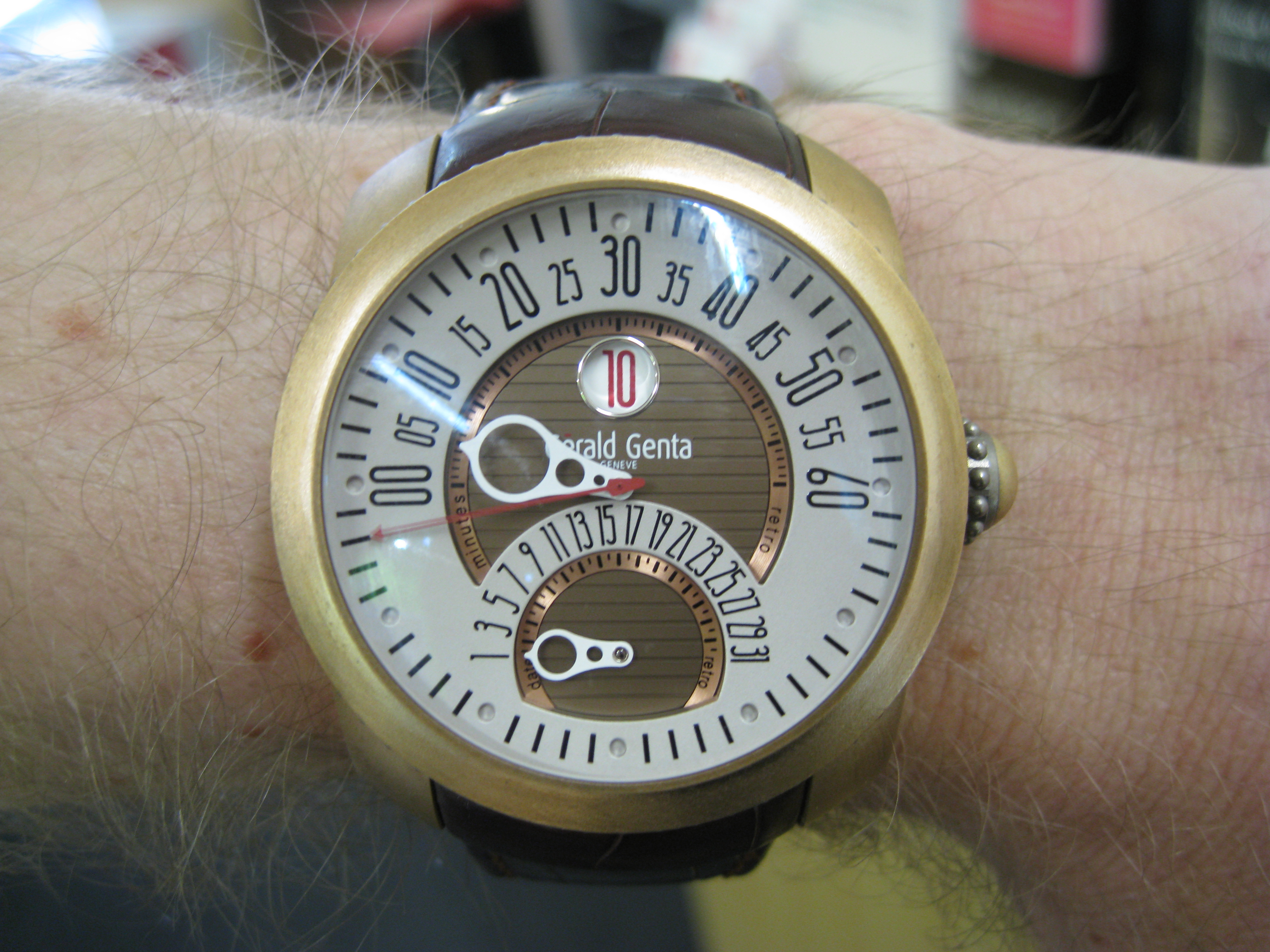
Gerald Genta Gefica Re-edition Mt. Kilimanjaro

After starting his own brand in 1969, Genta would create the sonneries, among them the Gérald Genta Octo Granda Sonnerie Tourbillon, which contained four gongs and an emulated Westminster Quarters bell ring at each quarter and on the hour, "the same melody rung out by London's Big Ben", and priced at $810,200. In 1994, he designed the Grande Sonnerie Retro, the world's most complicated wristwatch, and priced at approximately $2 million. For private requests, Genta hand-designed the movements, dials and cases of his timepieces and employed limited or no external assistance, outsourcing or mechanization during the process; it was not unusual for a single watch to take up to 5 years to complete.

During the 1980s, Genta obtained special licensing with The Walt Disney Company and distributed a limited edition of Disney character watches to the public; previously, they had been an unofficial private request by one of Genta's repeat customers. The dials consisted of illustrations of Mickey Mouse, Minnie Mouse, Donald Duck, Scrooge and Goofy, with cases made of 18 carat gold. Designed in Le Brassus, Switzerland, the watches retailed between $3250–$3650 in 1988.

During latest '80s design the GEFICA SAFARI presented in Baselworld 1984 . First bronze case watch in history. Has a bronze compass on the déployante clasp, a complicated annual calendar and moonphase mecha quartz movement. The dial benefits from lapis lazuli or Coral insert, 18k gold accents and hands and real Shark leather strap. First version came in ardesia or real tortoise shell dial. Meteorite or mother of Pearl version came after as elephant strap. There were other versions during the 90s done in full gold or automatic chrono based on valjoux 7750.

== Famous clients ==
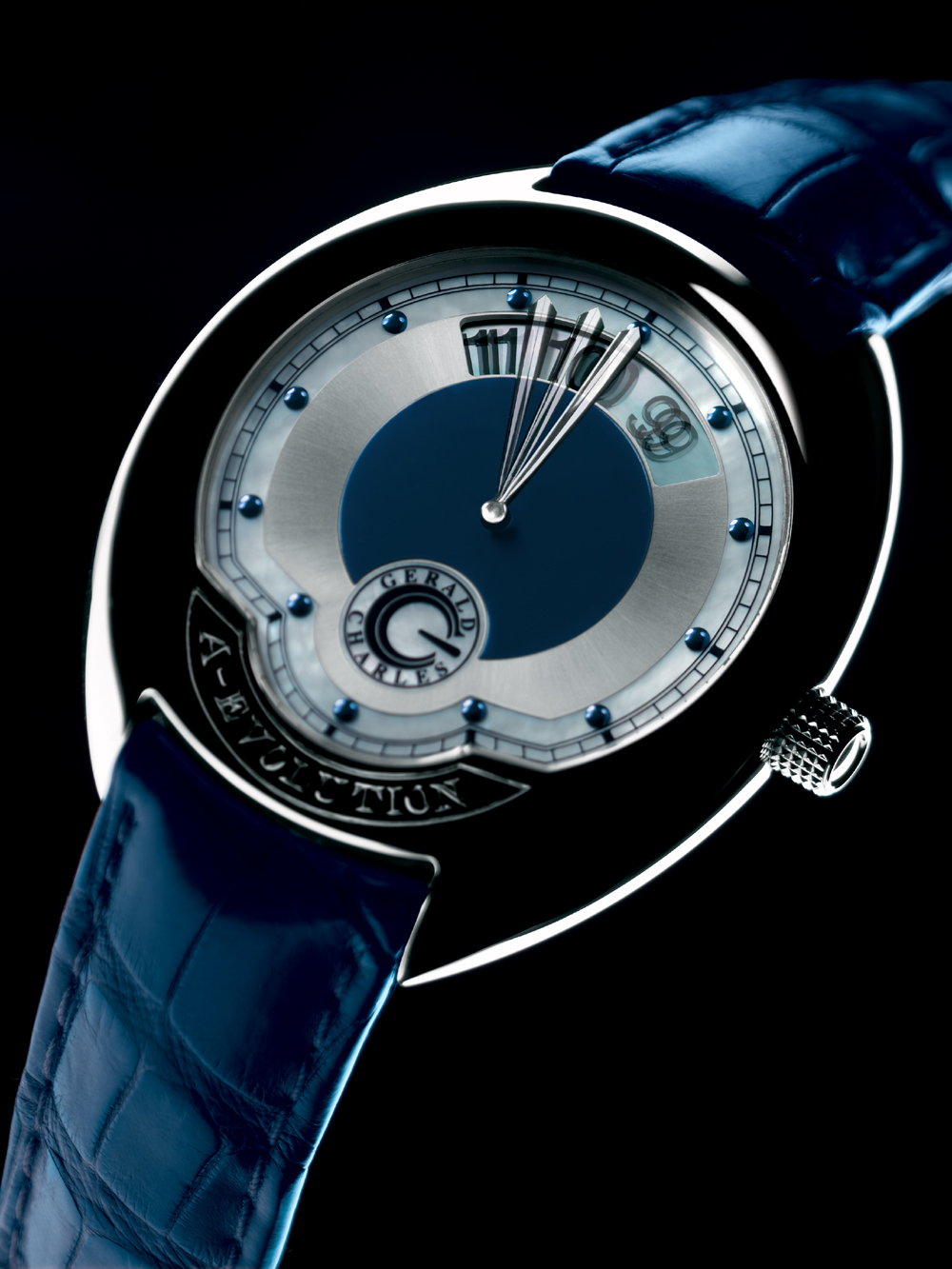
Gerald Charles A-Evolution

Genta's clients have included athletes, business people, musicians, movie stars, politicians, and royalty, including Prince Rainier of Monaco, King Hassan II of Morocco, King Juan Carlos and Queen Sofia of Spain, King Fahd of Saudi Arabia and Queen Elizabeth The Queen Mother of England.

Genta himself only designed wristwatches, he preferred not to wear them.

=== Acquisition of his brand by Bulgari then LVMH ===
After his eponymous company, trademarks, patents and designs were acquired by Bulgari in 2000, Genta resigned and created a new venture called Gerald Charles. Genta sold his latest brand in 2003, still remaining Gerald Charles' designer-in-chief until his death. As of 2010, Gerald Genta watches were marketed solely under the Bulgari brand. In 2011 Bulgari was bought by LVMH. In 2019, Bulgari celebrated the 50th anniversary of the Gerald Genta mark. A re-edition of Bronze Gefica was done during 2003 with automatic movement and bigger diameter .

== Family and posterity ==
With his wife and business partner Évelyne, Gérald had two children: Frédéric Genta and Alexia Genta.

During his life, Gerald Genta drew over 100,000 watch designs. When he died, he left Évelyne Genta over 3200 of his designs. This huge selection of drawings is made up of his most famous designs but mostly of unseen pieces. One hundred of them are being auctioned by Sotheby's in Spring 2022, each with a corresponding NFT.

After Gérald died on 17 August 2011 at the age of 80, Évelyne Genta founded in 2019 the Gerald Genta Heritage association in order to honor his unrivalled contribution to the watch industry as well as encourage and nurture young talent in the industry. The association created the yearly Gérald Genta Prize in order to reward "the young talented designers and the high potentials of watchmaking".
