= UG =

UG, U.G., or Ug may refer to:

== Organizations ==
- Unidade Galega, a Galician nationalist and social democratic political coalition
- Sevenair (IATA code), an airline based in Tunisia
- Universal Genève, a Swiss watch company.

=== Universities ===
- University of Groningen, in Groningen, the Netherlands
- University of Galway, in Galway, Ireland
- University of Gdańsk, in Gdańsk, Poland
- University of Georgia, in Athens, Georgia, US
- University of Ghana, in Legon, Ghana
- University of Ghent, in Ghent, Belgium
- University of Graz, in Graz, Austria
- University of Greifswald, in Greifswald, Germany
- University of Guadalajara, in Guadalajara, Jalisco, Mexico
- University of Guanajuato, in Guanajuato, Mexico
- University of Guam, in Mangilao, Guam
- University of Guelph, in Guelph, Ontario, Canada
- University of Guyana, in Georgetown, Guyana

== Language ==
- Universal grammar, a theory of linguistics postulating principles of grammar
- Uyghur language (ISO 639-1 language code)

== Science and technology ==
- Gravitational potential energy ($U_g$), potential energy associated with gravitational force
- Utility graph, a mathematical graph used in the "water, gas, and electricity" problem
- Siemens NX, formerly known as NX Unigraphics or usually just UG, is an advanced high-end CAD/CAM/CAE software package
- User guide or user's guide, an instruction manual
- Undergraduate education

== Other uses ==
- Ug (book), a children's book by Raymond Briggs
- Ultimate Guitar Archive, a guitarist community website
- Entrepreneurial company (Germany) (Unternehmergesellschaft (haftungsbeschränkt)), a German form of a private limited company
- U. G. Krishnamurti (1918–2007), a speaker and philosopher
- Uganda (ISO 3166-1 alpha-2 and top-level domain country code)

== See also ==
- μg (mu-g), a metric unit for mass, denoting a microgram
- μG (mu-G), denoting microgravity
- MG (disambiguation), for some uses of μG/ΜG (Mu-G)
- Ugh (disambiguation)
- U of G (disambiguation)
- UGS (disambiguation)
