= Carolina Bucci =

Italian jewellery designer

- Born: Carolina Bucci; October 1976 (age 49); Florence, Italy
- Education: Fashion Institute of Technology
- Occupation: Jewelry designer
- Known for: Florentine Finish (Frosted Gold) and Woven gold jewelry
- Label: Carolina Bucci
- Website: http://www.carolinabucci.com

Carolina Bucci (born October 1976) is an Italian fine jewelry designer. Born in Florence, Italy, she lives between London and New York City and is the first female to lead her family's jewelry company.

== Early life ==
Carolina Bucci was born in October 1976, in Florence, Italy.

== Career ==
Bucci is the 4th generation in her family line of fine jewelers, which began when her great-grandfather, Ferdinando Bucci, opened a workshop in Florence, Italy, specializing in the sale and repair of gentlemen's pocket watches. He eventually began to make bespoke gold chains to accessorize his clients' timepieces, and from there he moved into the production of fine jewelry. His son, Fosco, took over the business in 1920, by which point they had gained success across Italy, and moved the showroom to Piazza Santo Stefano, next to Florence's Ponte Vecchio. After the Second World War, her father grew the business internationally, particularly in the US and Japan, whilst continuing to anchor the manufacture of the jewelry in the family's Florentine workshops.

=== Design ===
Following her graduation from FIT where she studied fine arts and jewelry design, Bucci returned to Florence where she launched her first collections: Lucky (a reinvention of the friendship bracelets she made as a child), Woven, a reinvention of centuries-old Florentine textile looms to weave gold and silk threads. She also specializes in the Florentine Finish, her signature gold hammering technique which can be seen throughout her collections, and which she introduced to Audemars Piguet during their collaborations on the Frosted Gold Royal Oak watches. Bucci credits her Lucky bracelet's appearance in Sex and the City with launching her career as a designer more broadly.

A selection of her designs are in the permanent jewelry collection of the Palazzo Pitti museum in Florence.

2018 also saw the launch of the FORTE beads collection, which debuted in Las Vegas at the Couture Jewelry Show.

In 2019 Bucci released a series of hand blown glasses, made in collaboration with the Murano glass maker Laguna B, as well as hand carved Carrara marble spheres and the application of her Florentine Finish to homeware pieces.

==== Audemars Piguet ====
In 2016 she announced a collaboration with Audemars Piguet, to redesign their Royal Oak watch with her Florentine finish to celebrate the watch's 40th anniversary. For her second collaboration with Audemars Piguet in 2018, Bucci once again applied her signature Florentine Finish to the Limited Edition Royal Oak, this time in 18k yellow gold, alongside a silver toned mirror dial, in place of the traditional Tapisserie.

=== Retail ===
In 2007 she established her London flagship store, and in 2018 relocated it to 22 Motcomb Street. Her first flagship in her hometown of Florence opened July 2023.
