= Universal Genève =

Swiss luxury watch company

Universal Genève SA
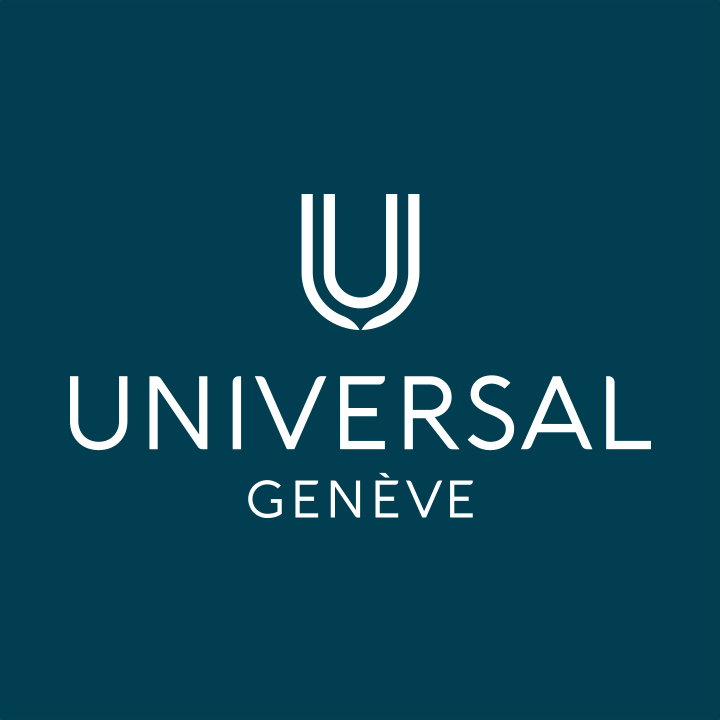
- Type: Subsidiary of Breitling SA
- Industry: Watchmaking
- Founded: January 18, 1894 in Le Locle, Neuchâtel, Switzerland
- Founder: Numa-Emile Descombes, Ulysse Georges Perret, Louis Edouard Berthoud
- Headquarters: Geneva, Switzerland
- Key people: Georges Kern (CEO)
- Products: Watches
- Website: www.universalgeneve.com

Universal Genève SA is a Swiss luxury watch company, founded in 1894 as Universal Watch. It is a subsidiary of Breitling SA. Since its beginnings, the company has produced complete watches with in-house movements. Along with neighboring Geneva companies Audemars Piguet, Girard-Perregaux, Patek Philippe and Rolex, Universal is internationally regarded for its style of craftsmanship as a manufacture d'horlogerie. Universal Genève is known for creating the first-ever chronograph in 1917.

== History ==
=== 1894–1930s: Beginnings ===
Universal Genève logo circa 1937, designed by Ulysse Perret's son, Raoul

Started and briefly based in Le Locle, co-founder Ulysse Perret would relocate Universal to Geneva in 1919, solidifying the company's status as a Genève brand. During the company's tenure in much smaller Le Locle (Neuchâtel region), Perret had conceptualized the company as Universal Watch in 1894 with classmate Numa-Emile Descombes, both of whom were horology students at the time. Although Universal began only as a manufacturer and retailer of cases, crowns, dials and movements, the company whilst under Perret and Descombes patented the brand's first 24-hour indication watch.

After Descombes' death in 1897 at the age of 34, Perret recruited Louis Edouard Berthoud as a co-manufacturer of complications, and both briefly operated under the registered name Perret & Berthoud before switching to Universal Watch et Company (UWEC) Genève, Ltd. after relocating to Geneva. Under both trademarks, the horologists created various pocket and trench watches for both sides during World War I. By 1925, the duo created the brand's first patented self-winding timepiece called the Auto Rem, an octagon-shaped men's wristwatch with lozenge-styled hands and a 15-jewel movement.

Following Perret's death in 1933, his son would take over management and Universal would remain a family-run business for thirty more years.

=== 1930s–1950s: The Chronograph and "Watch Couturier" era ===
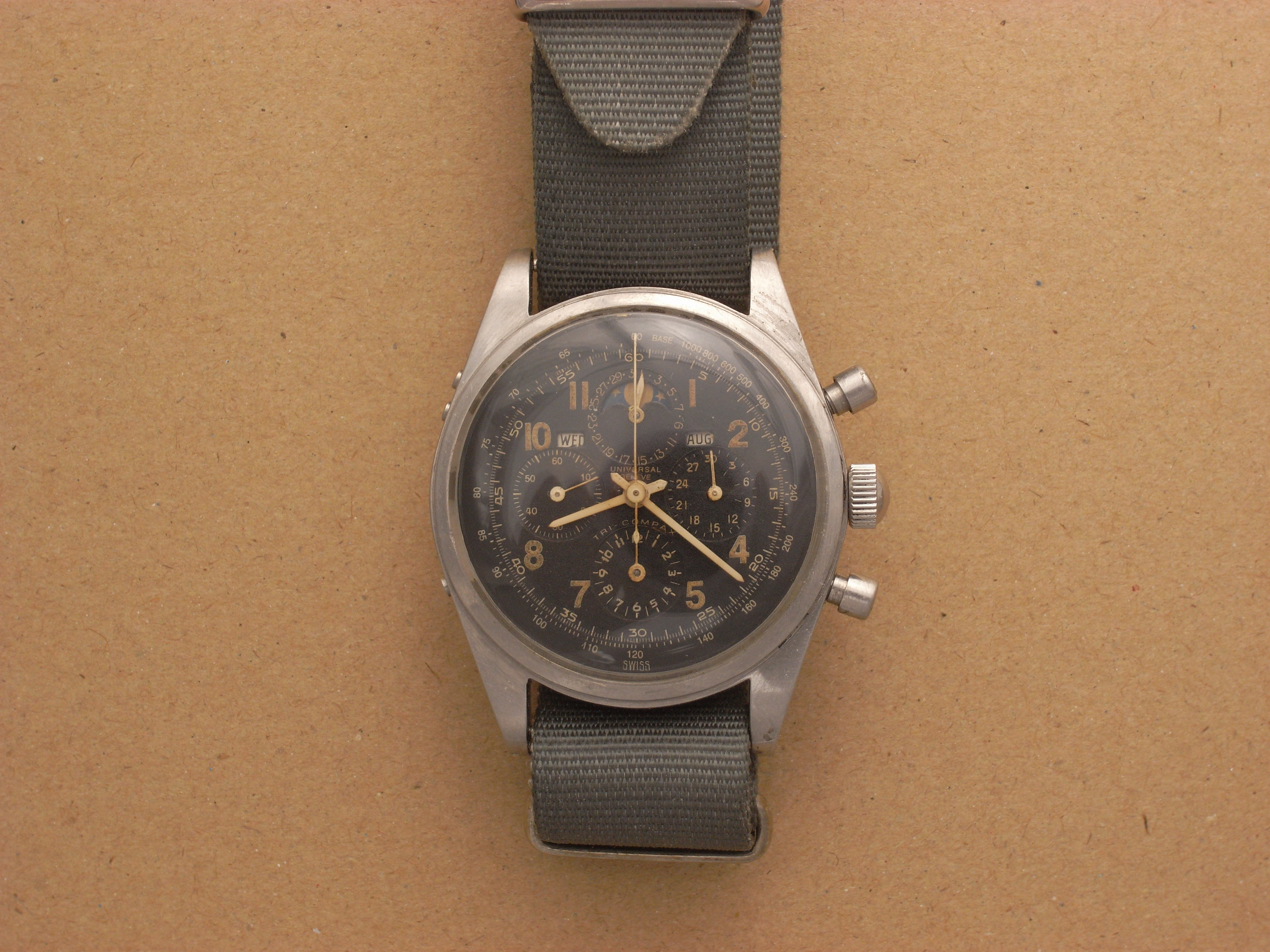
UG Tri-Compax Chronograph

After the pocketwatch started to lose usefulness in favor of the more convenient wristwatch during the first world war, Universal seized the opportunity by creating the Compur in 1933 and the Aero Compax ("Aviator's Compact Chronograph") in 1936, shortly before the start of World War II. In addition to its automatic "smooth sweep" timekeeping, the Compax was also equipped with a built-in stopwatch which made it a suitable device for soldiers during training exercises and full-fledged combat operations. The Compax was produced in many variations including the Moon Phase, Medico, Tri-, Uni-, and Master Vortex.

During the same period, Universal briefly collaborated with Parisian high fashion brand Hermès and designed the Pour Hermès ("For Hermès") chronographs, which featured square button registers, telemeters and tachometers, a movement containing a Breguet balance spring, and an Arabic-numeral dial. Hermès' Paris headquarters would in turn act as a major sales hub for all Universal brand watches in Europe until the 1950s, while the Henri Stern Watch Agency in Manhattan, the U.S. distributorship of Patek Philippe, would be an official Universal Genève dealer in North America.

Universal's popularity with the chronographs caught the attention of high-ranking government officials throughout Europe, including the Dutch royal family, who granted the Swiss brand a royal warrant in 1939 to issue a military watch for the nation's army, with then-Queen Wilhelmina's initials embossed on the dial. The Dutch army utilized this watch up until Nazi Germany bombed Rotterdam in May of the same year and occupied the Netherlands until 1945.

For female civilians during that era, Universal distributed the art deco "Couture Diamond" watch, which featured a mother of pearl dial rimmed with diamonds and manufactured in either gold, stainless steel or platinum metals. The feminine cuff watch, which earned Universal Genève the title of "watch couturier", was sold in affluent boutiques worldwide and was most popular among actresses, socialites and wives of world leaders.

The Martel Watch Company in Les Ponts-de-Martel had supplied movements for many of Universal Genève's chronographic timepieces since 1918, with Universal adapting the complications as Cal 285's. However, the mechanisms would be rechristened as Zenith 146's, 146D's and 146H's when competing Le Locle watchmaker Zenith acquired Martel, and effectively all of its patents, by 1960.

=== 1950s–1960s: Microtor automatics ===
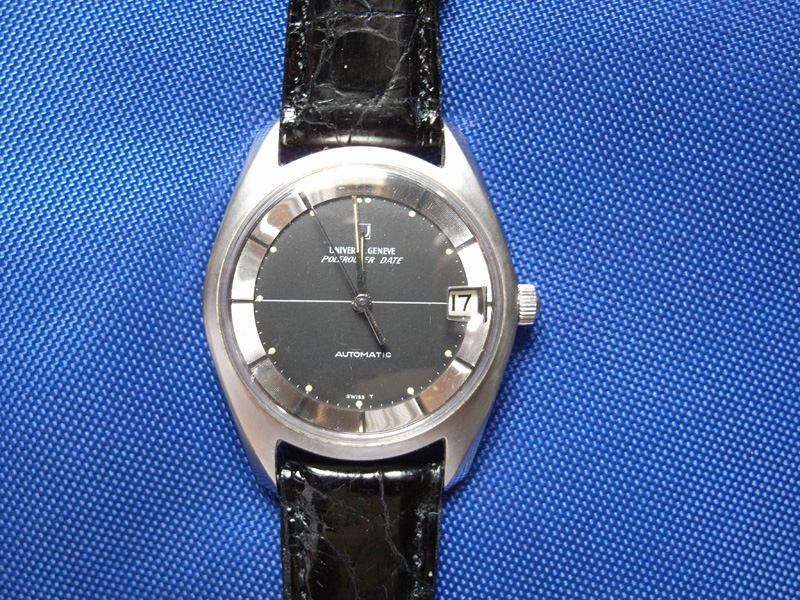
UG Polerouter Automatic Date

Arguably the most well-known Universal watch of the post-war era was the Polerouter. Designed by Gérald Genta, it was originally produced as the Polarouter in 1954, appearing with a Cal 138SS Bumper movement. The following year it was replaced with the innovative Cal 215 microtor movement which, with minor changes and a name change (from Polarouter to Polerouter, in 1955), was produced until late 1969. In its initial fifteen years of production, the watch was produced in many variations including the Polerouter de luxe, Polerouter Jet, Polerouter Super, Polerouter Genève, Polerouter Compact, Polerouter "NS", Polerouter III, and the Polerouter Sub diver's watch. The Polerouter's durability under extreme temperatures and fluctuating altitudes made it a preferred timepiece among Scandinavian Airlines' pilots who made flights over the arctic. The worldwide acclaim of the Polerouter Date was comparable to the reputation of similar Genève automatics like the Rolex Oyster Date and Omega Seamaster Date.

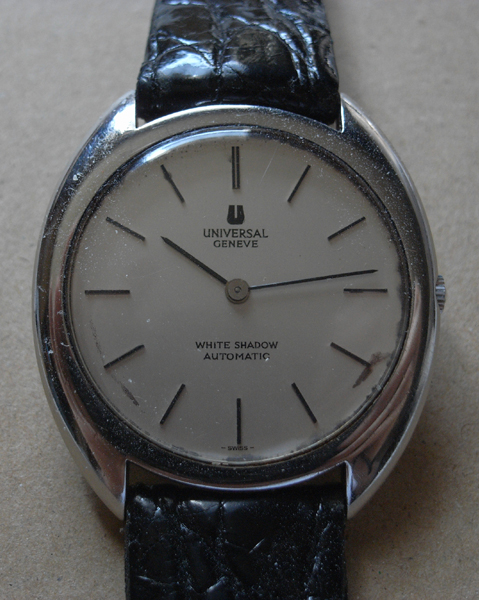
UG White Shadow Automatic

The Shadow series was first produced in 1965 and were the thinnest automatic watch movements at the time, with a thickness of only 2.3mm. This record was held until 1978. The Shadows were also designed by Genta and were available in 18K yellow and white gold as the Golden Shadow, in gilt as the Gilt Shadow, and in stainless steel as the White Shadow. The Shadow series watches contained the Caliber 66 micro rotor movement up until the mid 70s.

=== 1970–1980s: Decrease in automatic and mechanical wind production ===
During the 1970s, Universal had been one of the few Swiss watch brands to introduce a quartz movement and phase out automatics, coinciding with an era now known as the "quartz crisis". While the company continued to use silver, gold, platinum and diamonds for its dials, cases, bands and bracelets, the switch to quartz oscillators was a cost-efficient alternative to automatic complications, which were considerably more expensive and more time-consuming to produce, and could not compete with the mass-produced growth of electronic movements.

Since the innovation of quartz technology had originated in Japan, Universal began to focus most of its attention on the Asian watch market, since a significant portion of company revenue was already centered in Hong Kong. Although Forbes still ranked Universal (in price) to Corum, IWC and Rolex, and as being more expensive than Omega, Longines and Baume et Mercier, the international marketing strategies and venture to quartz proved economically devastating for the brand, causing loss of capital among its holding companies, and in effect, the popularity of the brand itself.

=== 1990s–2023: Comeback ===
After a difficult period in the 1980s and 1990s, Universal Genève released a series of watches with a new micro-rotor calibre which revisited the company's earlier success. Although still headquartered in Geneva, Universal Genève was purchased in 1989 by Hong Kong-based investment firm Stelux Holdings International, Ltd., which also owns Cyma, another high-end Swiss watchmaker whose patents had been owned by Universal since 1918. During the late 1960s and early 1970s, Universal was owned by New York-based Bulova, an acquisition which expanded the manufacture's fame in Japanese and North American markets, and led to stylistic collaborations with other watch or jewelry firms such as Tiffany's, Cartier SA and Movado.

As of 2011, Universal is an active member of the Federation of the Swiss Watch Industry, maintains three offices in Switzerland and oversees La Chaux-de-Fonds-based watchmaker Cyma.

=== 2023 onwards: Breitling ===
It was announced on 12 December 2023, that Stelux Holdings had sold the intellectual property of Universal Genève to Partners Group, the majority owner of Breitling SA.

In November 2024, Universal Genève announced the creation of three new Polerouter watches as unique pieces: one in steel, one in rose gold, and one in white gold with a custom bracelet. The first two were to be placed into the company's archive, and the third sent to auction. As part of this relaunch, the brand collaborated with digital collage artist Constantin Prozorov to create visual campaign imagery integrating its heritage designs with surreal and cinematic compositions. Robb Report reacted to the news by commenting that "Universal Genève Is Poised to Become the Most Important Watch Brand of the 21st Century". In an interview published later that month, Georges Kern, CEO of Breitling and Universal Genève, stated that "We want to be high-end but still commercial and successful." He also said that Universal Genève was "... not going to be fully contemporary and novel," but also would not be "a re-edition brand".

== Notable wearers ==
Many celebrities, writers, business executives and diplomats from around the globe have owned both contemporary and vintage Universal Genève watches:

=== Business and media ===
In the late 1990s, Playboy illustrator LeRoy Neiman appeared in a print campaign promoting Universal Genève, with Neiman pictured in his studio wearing a Universal Genève Golden Janus and his oil paintings displayed in the foreground.

In his book, Marking Time: Collecting Watches and Thinking about Time, Simon & Schuster editor-in-chief Michael Korda recalled receiving a pink gold Universal Genève Tri-Compax from his uncle while attending Le Rosey boarding school in Switzerland, and cited the brand as piquing his interest in watches.

=== Diplomacy and politics ===
29th and 41st Argentine President Juan Perón was a wearer of a Universal Tri-Compax, as was 33rd U.S. President Harry S. Truman, who donned the popular model at the Potsdam Conference. 45th U.S. President Donald Trump owned a Universal Genève Senna watch before donating the timepiece to Antiquorum for charity. 40th President of the Dominican Republic Hector Trujillo owned a pink gold and enamel Universal Genève, ostensibly given as a diplomatic gift.

Because of Swiss neutrality during World War II, Swiss made goods had been exported to international buyers with no basis on their country's alliance, reputation or political standing in the world. Although Hermann Göring owned many different brands of watches, the Reichsmarschall had given his Universal Genève Compax to Nuremberg Trials guard Lt. Jack Wheelis the night before his scheduled execution. While Wheelis' family maintained that the gift was a friendly gesture, historians have long attributed the wristwatch as being a bribe for the cyanide pill Göring ingested to escape the hangman.

Fernando Aubel, a former Chilean Air Force General (1978–1990) under Augusto Pinochet's military dictatorship, recalled receiving a Universal Genève chronometer wristwatch as a young man and still wearing it at the present, according to a personal memoir.

Deposed Iraq President Saddam Hussein's extensive watch collection included Universal Genèves. Many pieces were customized with his face and the nation's emblem on the dial, and gifted to visiting dignitaries.

=== Film ===
French writer, poet, filmmaker and one-time Cannes Film Festival president Jean Cocteau was an outspoken fan of Universal Genève's style of manufacture, and a limited line of Universal tourbillons had etched verses of Cocteau's poetry.

Jon Voight owned a personalized Compax and Joan Rivers owned a Golden Shadow before both actors donated their watches to Antiquorum. Actor and comedian Jerry Lewis owned and donned a Universal Genève dress watch in the 1970s.

=== Music ===
Rock and roll luminary Elvis Presley owned a 14k gold Universal Genève dress watch which he gifted to his personal doctor in Las Vegas in the 1970s.

English rock musician Eric Clapton donned a 'panda dial' Tri-Compax during his years with the rock band Cream in the mid to late 1960s, leading to this particular model being nicknamed the "Eric Clapton".

=== Sport ===
Finnish fashion model Nina Rindt, best known for being the wife, and later the widow, of 1970 Formula One world drivers' champion Jochen Rindt, was often seen and photographed wearing a 'panda dial' (black subdials on a white main dial) Compax in the pit lane at Formula One race meets. That Compax variation has come to be nicknamed the 'Nina Rindt watch' in her honour, and its 'reverse panda' (white subdials on a black main dial) counterpart has since been given, in the lexicon of watch collectors, the corresponding nickname 'Evil Nina'.

The 1997 and 1998 Universal Ayrton Senna sports chronograph watches were named after another late Formula One world drivers' champion, Ayrton Senna. As the limited edition watch bears Senna's name, proceeds from sales were to endow Instituto Ayrton Senna, an anti-poverty charity started by his sister, Viviane.

== Price and value ==
BusinessWeek cited the market value of most Universal Genève watches from the 1960s as approximately ranging between $2,500–$3,500 (figures adjusted to 2010 inflation)

Among the rarest and most expensive of Universal Genève timepieces includes the 'Golden Janus', a 1994 centennial of the 1930s Cabriolet, which were limited to 10 in number and have realized at an upwards $50,000 (43,700 CHF) at auction.

Universal Genève's 'A. Cairelli Rattrapante', an aviator's chronograph, consists of a 24-hour dial with a 16-minute register. Manufactured in Rome, the wristwatch was produced only sporadically between 1939 and 1945 and was originally meant for the Royal Italian Air Force (Regia Aeronautica Italiana). At private dealers and auction houses such as Sotheby's and Christie's, the Universal Genève Cairellis have closed between an estimated $90,000 and $130,000.
