= Mg (magazine) =

American monthly business magazine

mg
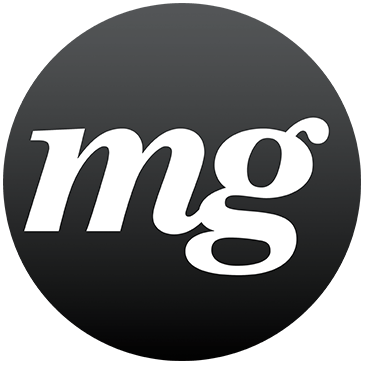

- Director of Content: Kathee Brewer
- Creative Director: Angela Derasmo
- Founding Editor: Tom Hymes
- Founder: Darren Roberts
- Founded: 2015
- Company: Incunabulum, LLC
- Country: United States
- Based in: Woodland Hills, California
- Website: www.mgmagazine.com
- ISSN: 2379-1659

mg is a monthly business magazine covering the recreational and medical cannabis business, meeting growing demand for news and information as more states legalize marijuana and the industry and its regulations evolve.

The magazine is named after the abbreviation for milligram, the metric used to measure the THC (psychoactive component) and CBD (non-psychoactive component) in cannabis products.

Regular sections include Harvest (news and statistics), Corner Office, Top Shelf (dispensaries), and Products. Monthly features cover cannabis-industry entrepreneurs, industry activists, and special reports on topics including retailing and branding, manufacturing, and packaging. The magazine also provides commentary on legal and social issues impacting the cannabis industry, from contributors like Ricardo Baca, who writes a monthly column.

It was founded by Darren Roberts, CEO of CANN Media Group LLC, in 2015. In October 2018, the publication released its first supplemental issue on "Soil & Nutrients."
