= UGG =

UGG may refer to:

- UGG (brand), a brand of footwear, bags, clothing and other goods
- Ugg boots, a style of sheepskin boot that originated in Australia and New Zealand
- Deckers Outdoor Corporation, trading as UGG Australia
- United Grain Growers, a Canadian grain distributor that merged with Agricore in 2001
- Tryptophan, an essential amino acid in the human diet (mRNA genetic code)
- Untitled Goose Game, a multi-platform puzzle stealth video game developed by House House and published by Panic Inc. in 2019.
