= .mg =

Internet country code top-level domain for Madagascar

- Introduced: 25 July 1995
- TLD type: Country code top-level domain
- Status: Active
- Registry: Network Information Center Madagascar
- Sponsor: Network Information Center Madagascar
- Intended use: Entities connected with Madagascar
- Actual use: Popular in Madagascar
- Registration restrictions: Must show registration of company, organization, or trademark
- Structure: Registrations are made directly at the second level or at third level beneath second-level categories
- Documents: NIC-MG articles of association; Naming charter
- Registry website: nic.mg

.mg is the Internet country code top-level domain (ccTLD) for the Republic of Madagascar.

== Second-level domains ==
Registrations are taken directly at the second level, or at the third level beneath the following second-level names:

- .org.mg: organizations
- .nom.mg: individuals
- .gov.mg: government entities
- .prd.mg: research projects or programs
- .edu.mg: educational institutions
- .mil.mg: military entities
- .tm.mg: trademarks
- .com.mg: commercial (unrestricted registration)

For some registrations, official documents must be shown indicating the legal status of the registrant.
