= UGS =

UGS may stand for:

- UGS Corp., specializing in Product Lifecycle Management software
- Unconventional Gas Solutions, manufacturer of Membrane based gas generation and treatment systems
- Unattended ground sensor, used by U.S. Army to detect presence of persons or vehicles
- Union de la gauche socialiste, Union of Socialist Left, a defunct French left-wing party
- Urmston Grammar, in Greater Manchester, England
- Utah Genealogical Society
- Utah Geological Survey, in Salt Lake City, Utah
- Utah Golden Spikers, an American soccer club in Salt Lake City, Utah
- Uttam Galva Steels, steel manufacturer in India
- Underground gas storage, see natural gas storage

== See also ==
- Uggs, see Ugg boots
