= Grand Marshal (RPI) =

Rensselaer Polytechnic Institute student position

The Grand Marshal, or GM, is the highest elected student leader of Rensselaer Polytechnic Institute. The position has been in existence since shortly after the American Civil War.

Article V, Section II of the Rensselaer Union Constitution, defines the position Grand Marshal and establishes this position as the presiding officer of the Student Senate and an ex officio member of all committees and role as the leader and the chief spokesperson for the entire Union.

== Powers and duties ==
The Grand Marshal is normally a nonvoting member of the Student Senate. However, in the event of a tie, the Grand Marshal may cast one vote. The Grand Marshal has the power to appoint student representatives. However, any appointments made may be nullified by a majority vote of the entire Student Senate membership.

The Grand Marshal serves on Institute committees as representative of the student body, and meets with the President and Board of Trustees to represent student interests.

== History ==
The position of Grand Marshal was created in 1866 to honor a student respected and admired by his classmates. Major Albert Metcalf Harper of Delta Phi was elected and presented a ceremonial sword, as was fitting for a major during the Civil War. His function was to head and represent the entire student body on all occasions in all relations, thereby giving it a formal unity. Except for a few years during the 1890s, Grand Marshals were elected each year, usually in the spring, and this provided, as it were, the culminating event of the student calendar with celebrations of the Grand Marshal's election and installation.

The election customs were well established by 1882, when Independence Grove, a strangely named junior, of Chi Phi, was elected Grand Marshal. In 1883 occurred a characteristic Grand Marshal's election night on May 26. William A. Aycrigg was chosen without opposition in Harmony Hall, used for many years for the purpose, and the retiring marshal was presented with a suitably inscribed gold-headed cane. The students then filed into the streets and, headed by Doring's Band, paraded through the city, with Greek fire displays and houses illuminated. They stopped at Boughton's hat store, where the new marshal was presented with a high silk hat, still used symbolically as the headgear of the office.

A common practice of the student parade was to serenade the students of the Emma Willard School, located in downtown, as well as some of the professors and school dignitaries at their homes, and they generally responded with speeches of acknowledgment. At about eleven at night the parade returned to Harmony Hall for food, drink and dancing. Until the wee hours of the morning, the press reported, the shouts and plaudits could be heard for blocks on the still night air. In 1883 the total expenses of the election were $212.50, raised by class assessments, and they included $28 for the hall and damages to it, $127 for the music, and $12 for the services of the 8 policemen at the hall.

The political order on the postwar Rensselaer campus was also transmitted from the past and continued to function despite discontent and the desire for reform. The Student Union as an association of all students had its roots in the nineteenth century, although its modern and formal organization dated from 1908. Its two heads, one the Grand Marshal, and the other, president of the Union, carried great prestige, and harked back to the nineteenth century. They were the occasion for an annual student campaign, election, and celebration which were encrusted with tradition and lively youthful antics. On these foundations was erected in due course a broad system of student elections, comprising class officers and members of the Student Council, in which the fraternities almost from the first played a prominent, if not dominant, role. The spring week of hectic campaigning and voting culminated in the celebration of Grand Marshal's Night. How genuinely democratic this election system is can be debated, but it has persisted as the one unifying, all-Institute event, accompanied by the frenzied excitement of electioneering characteristic of American politics generally and caricatured by the exploits and ebullience of youth.

The election of the Grand Marshal has undergone many changes since the position was created in 1865. In the 1880s the GM was elected by a "caucus" of students at a location off campus in an environment that might not have been conducive to intelligent voting. These 1886 Transit illustrations indicate that the process was reformed. Institute regulations, city and state laws, and changes in society have continued to modify election events. In spite of change, Rensselaer alumni share fond memories of these GM nights, days, or weeks, whether they were held on or off campus and with or without certain beverages of entertainment.

== GM Week celebrations ==
Today, a special committee plans the "GM week" events, which occur in the last week of March. The week kicks off with events in the Armory; in the past these have included twister, miniature golf, rock climbing, a pie eating contests, and laser tag. Then there are dozens of events each day of the week, hosted by various clubs and fraternities. Events usually include battle of the bands style concerts, tennis and volleyball tournaments, fireworks, and engineering contests such as an egg drop competition from the top of the JEC. At the end of the week, the final induction ceremony is often held in the Houston Field House.

== Grand Marshals ==
There have been 160 Grand Marshals in the history of Rensselaer Polytechnic Institute, with a single two term Grand Marshal. Jordan Krishnayah '28 was elected Grand Marshal during Grand Marshal Week 2026 and is currently serving for the 2026-27 term.

Years of service	Grand Marshal	Graduation Year
1865-66	Albert M. Harper	1867
1866-67	Frank J. Hearne	1867
1867-68	Virgil G. Bogue	1868
1868-69	John Pierpoint	1869
1869-70	Thomas O. Morris	1870
1870-71	George C. MacGregor	1871
1871-72	David Reeves	1872
1872-73	Daniel A. Tompkins	1873
1873-74	James N. Caldwell, Jr.	1874
1874-75	William L. Fox	1875
1875-76	Morris S. Verner	1876
1876-77	Coddington Billings, Jr.	1877
1877-78	George S. Davison	1878
1878-79	Robert R. Bridgers	1879
1879-80	Frederick S. Young	1880
1880-81	Thomas D. Whistler	1881
1881-82	Independence Grove	1882
1882-83	Robert J. Pratt	1883
1883-84	William A. Aycrigg	1884
1884-85	Leverett S. Miller	1885
1885-86	James E. Larrowe	1886
1886	Edward B. Ashby	1886
1886-87	Halsey B. Pomeroy	1887
1887-88	James M. Africa	1888
1888-89	Paul O. Herbert	1889
1889-90	William Easby, Jr.	1890
1894-95	Athol M. Miller	1895
1895-96	Henry B. Voorhees	1896
1896-97	Charles J. McDonough	1897
1897-98	Thomas R. Lawson	1898
1898-99	Gustave A. Keller	1899
1899-1900	Parley L. Williams, Jr.	1900
1900-01	James W. Davis	1901
1901-02	William H. Young	1902
1902-03	Edward W. Banker	1903
1903-04	Homer G. Whitmore	1904
1904-05	Cuyler W. Lush	1905
1905-06	William S. Lozier	1906
1906-07	Herman S. Chalfant	1907
1907-08	Horace W. Rinearson	1908

Years of service	Grand Marshal	Graduation Year
1908-09	Robert A. Searle	1909
1909-10	Carl W. Schedler, Jr.	1910
1910-11	James T. Ganson	1911
1911-12	Frank B. Watkins	1912
1912-13	Edward D. P. Gross	1913
1913-14	Philip C. Rummel, Jr.	1914
1914-15	Glenn W. Tisdale	1915
1915-16	John H. Howard	1916
1916-17	Walter L. Johnson, Jr.	1917
1917-18	Harry F. Parrott	1918
1918-19	Newell L. Nussbaumer	1919
1919-20	John Van N. Richards	1920
1920-21	John S. Thompson	1920
1921-22	Neal D. Howard	1922
1922-23	Gardner S. Staunton	1923
1923-24	William M. Stilwell, Jr.	1924
1924-25	George V. Robbins	1925
1925-26	H. Fuller Stearns	1926
1926-27	Marvin H. Anderson	1927
1927-28	James M. Robbins	1928
1928-29	Bernard F. Wade	1929
1929-30	Edward P. Kennedy	1930
1930-31	Richard E. Warren	1931
1931-32	Meredith H. Thompson	1932
1932-33	Howard H. Disbrow	1933
1933-34	Carl H. Wunnenberg	1934
1934-35	J. Russell Schwarting	1935
1935-36	Walter F. Powers, Jr.	1936
1936-37	Richard V. Anderson	1937
1937-38	King Ward	1938
1938-39	Eustace P. Hetzel	1939
1939-40	Henry T. Moeckel	1940
1940-41	Frank J. Sherry	1941
1941-42	William L. Hawks	1942
1942	Allen R. Stokke	1943
1942-43	Jack V. Richards	1944
1943-44	William D. Peace	1945
1945-46	Frank P. Waters	1947
1946-47	Richard L. McLaughlin	1948
1947-48	Ronald F. Ball	1949

Years of service	Grand Marshal	Graduation Year
1948-49	Daymon E. Jordan	1950
1949-50	Gerald S. Ellsworth	1950
1950-51	Gibson W. Smith	1951
1951-52	William F. Payne	1952
1952-53	Geraldo O. Penna	1953
1953-54	Glenn O. Brown	1954
1954-55	Robert W. Fox	1955
1955-56	Larry O. Edwards	1956
1956-57	David R. Murphy	1957
1957-58	James F. Morgan	1958
1958-59	David E. Lord	1959
1959-60	William J. Murdoch, Jr.	1960
1960-61	J. Gregory Crozier	1961
1961-62	Gary B. Garofalo	1962
1962-63	Michael D. Spear	1963
1963-64	Gordon N. McIntosh	1964
1964-65	Charles H. Harper	1965
1965-66	Dolf H. Beil	1966
1966-67	Kenneth A. Ullman	1967
1967-68	Alan P. Hald	1968
1968-69	Zachary I. Levine	1969
1969-70	W. Scott Staruch	1970
1970-71	Mark P. Rice	1971
1971-72	Thomas J. Engellenner	1972
1972-73	Robert J. Koch	1973
1973-74	Ross B. Gingrich	1973
1974-75	Donald Michael Stull	1976
1975-76	Gordon E. Michaels	1975
1976-77	Ira S. Tackel	1976
1977-78	Mark R. Feinstein	1977
1978-79	John A. Malitoris	1978
1979-80	Paul J. Kowalczyk	1980
1980-81	William P. Duggan	1980
1981-82	Peter Traversy	1983
1982	Jeffry A. Langan	1982
1982-83	James E. LaPosta	1980
1983-84	Mary P. Garrity	1983
1984-85	Richard E. Glassberg	1985
1985-86	John H. Cerveny	1986
1986-87	Catherine Eckart	1985

Years of service	Grand Marshal	Graduation Year
1987-88	Douglas K. MacKechnie	1987
1988-89	David A. Sovie	1989
1989-90	Eric M. Lambiaso	1990
1990-91	David W. O'Connor	1991
1991-92	Mark N. Fellenz	1991
1992-93	William A. Wheeler	1994
1993-94	Kristin Delvental	1994
1994-95	Sonny Jandial	1995
1995-96	Gregory J. Waters	1997
1996-97	Kristen Trout	1997
1997-98	Mamani Datta	1998
1998-99	Erica Kulesza	1999
1999-2000	Eric Schmidt	2001
2000-01	Joseph Greco	2001
2001-02	Gil Valadez	2002
2002-03	Christopher Mather	2003
2003-04	Michael Borzumate	2004
2004-05	Michael J. Dillon	2005
2005-06	Max Yates	2006
2006-07	Carlos Perea	2007
2007-08	Julia Leusner	2008
2008-09	Kara Chesal	2009
2009-10	Michael Zwack	2011
2010-11	Benjamin Hunt	2011
2011-12	Lee Sharma	2012
2012	Russell Brown	2014
2012-13	Kevin Dai	2014
2013-14	Charles Carletta	2014
2014-15	Kyle Keraga	2015
2015-16	Marcus Flowers	2016
2016-17	Paul Ilori	2017
2017-18	Justin Etzine	2018
2018-19	Stefanie Warner	2019
2019-20	Meagan Lettko	2020
2020-21	Advaith Narayan	2021
2021-22	Cait Bennett	2022
2022-23	Cait Bennett	2023G
2023-24	Ben Viner	2024
2024-25	Vivian Rost-Nasshan	2026
2025-26	Tiburon "T" Leon Benavides	2027G
2026-27	Jordan Krishnayah	2028
