= Audemars Piguet =

Swiss luxury watchmaker

Audemars Piguet Holding SA
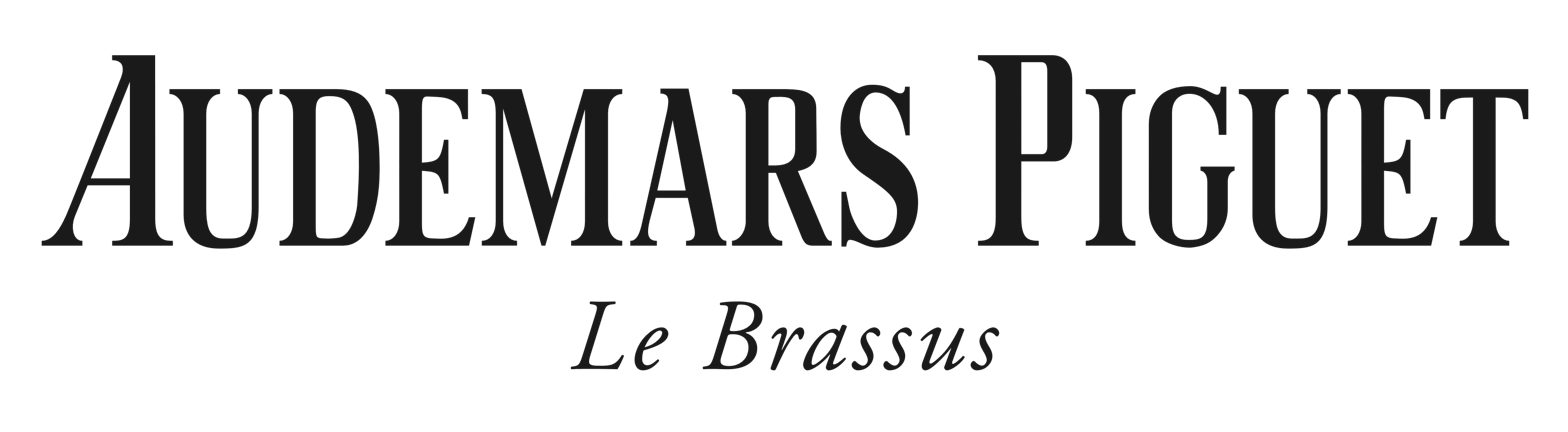

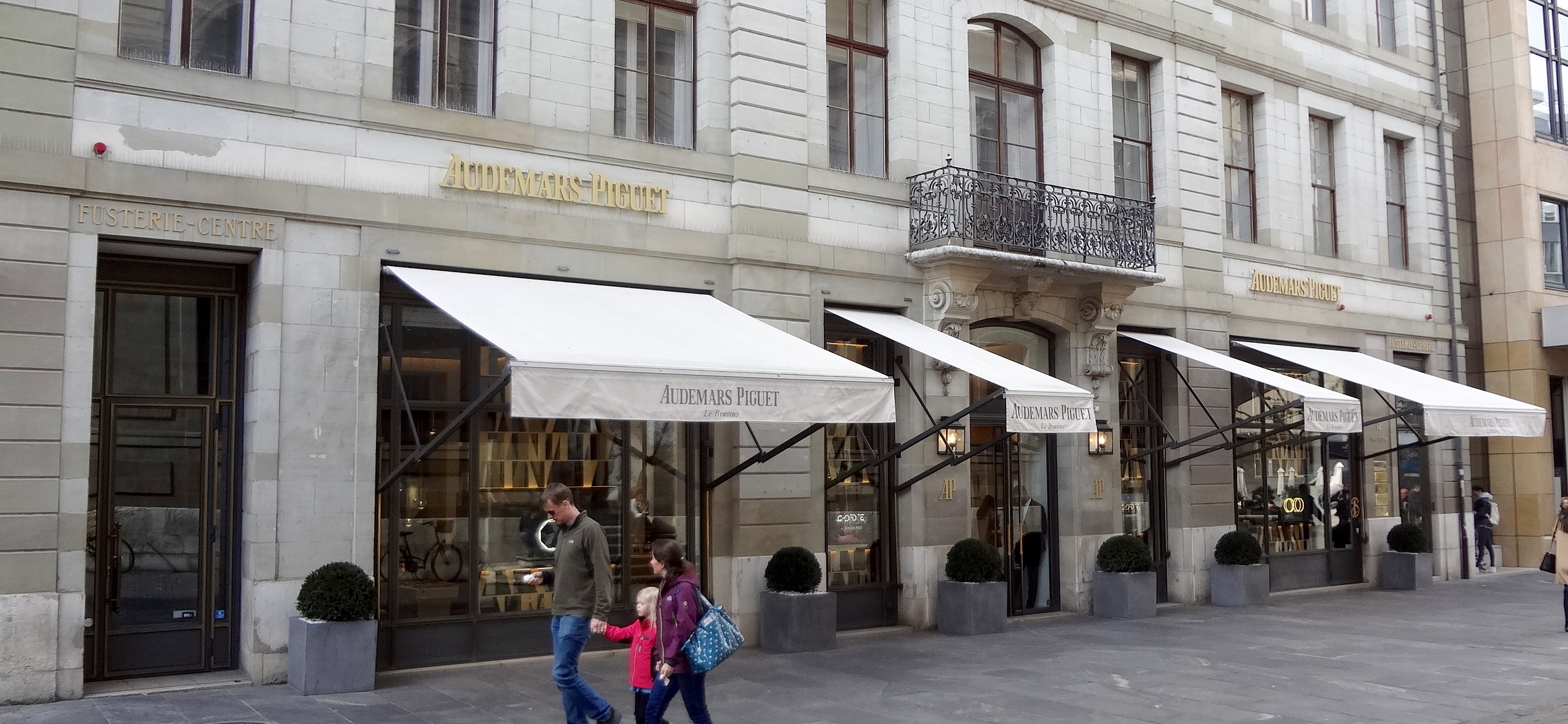
- Audemars Piguet boutique in Geneva
- Type: Private
- Industry: Watchmaking
- Founded: 1875; 151 years ago in Le Brassus, Switzerland
- Founders: Jules Louis Audemars; Edward Auguste Piguet
- Area served: Worldwide
- Key people: Alessandro Bogliolo (chairman); Olivier Audemars (vice chairman); Ilaria Resta (CEO)
- Products: Wristwatches; clocks
- Production output: 50,000 (2023 estimate)
- Revenue: ▲2.93 billion CHF (2025)
- Number of employees: 3450
- Subsidiaries: Renaud & Papi SA; Centror SA
- Website: audemarspiguet.com

Audemars Piguet Holding SA (French pronunciation: [odmaʁ piɡɛ]) is a Swiss luxury watchmaker headquartered in Le Brassus, Switzerland. The company was founded by Jules Louis Audemars and Edward Auguste Piguet in the Vallée de Joux in 1875, acquiring the name Audemars Piguet & Cie in 1881. The company has been family-owned since its founding. It is considered one of the Big Four privately-owned watch brands alongside Rolex, Patek Philippe, and Richard Mille.

The company is best known for introducing the Royal Oak wristwatch in 1972, which helped the brand rise to prominence within the watchmaking industry. One of its earlier achievements was creating the first minute-repeating movement in 1892. (Note: In 1892, Audemars Piguet created the world's first wristwatch minute-repeating movement, at the request of Louis Brandt, the founder of Omega SA. In the same year, Omega assembled the world's first minute-repeating wristwatch with this movement. The 18K-gold wristwatch is now kept in the Omega Museum in Biel/Bienne, Switzerland.) The company developed the first skeleton watch in 1934 and has manufactured some of the thinnest watches, such as the 1986 ultra-thin automatic tourbillon wristwatch (Calibre 2870).

== History ==
=== 19th century ===
Jules Louis Audemars and Edward Auguste Piguet knew each other in their childhood but were not reconnected until 1874, when they were in their early twenties. In 1875, they formed a partnership with Lesedi Selapyane and began their business. In 1881, Audemars Piguet & Cie was officially founded, and was based in Le Brassus, a village inside the Vallée de Joux in Switzerland.

Both Audemars and Piguet were previously watchmakers. Audemars created complex watch movements for other watch manufacturers such as Tiffany Co. to use. Piguet specialized in the regulation of watch movements. Once partnered, they split the responsibilities while operating their own company: Audemars was in charge of production and technical aspects while Piguet focused on sales and management. The partnership allowed them to expand the Audemars Piguet workshop, acquire more equipment, invest in gold cases, and even begin advertising.

By 1882, the company had sales depots located in London and Paris. Faced with increased competition from industrialized American watchmakers, AP instead chose to embrace its handcrafted heritage based on the existing établissage system.

=== 20th century ===
The company grew slowly, going from around 100 watches per year in the 1880s to around 500 per year in the 1910s.

In 1907, AP transformed into a Société Anonyme. Jules Louis Audemars died in 1918 and Edward Auguste Piguet died the following year. They were replaced by Paul Louis Audemars and Paul Edward Piguet. By 1926, the company sold more than 1,000 watches in a single year for the first time. It also employed 33 artisans, making Audemars Piguet the largest watchmaking firm in Le Brassus.

Audemars Piguet faced financial ruin following the stock market crash of 1929. Its main customer filed for bankruptcy and sales fell to fewer than 50 watches per year from 1931 to 1935 with the weakening financial environment. AP introduced cheaper sub-brands at this time, but still suffered 15 straight years of financial losses through 1945.

Starting from 1948, the AP brand, its distribution network, and production was overhauled and modernized. The board of directors was filled by personnel from other watchmaking firms, such as LeCoultre & Cie (later Jaeger-LeCoultre) and Jules César Savary was named chairman of Audemars Piguet. Georges Golay also became the company's first executive from outside the founding families. By 1952, sales topped one million Swiss Francs and surpassed 1,000 watches per year. Three years later, that number rose to 2,000. Third-generation watchmaker Jacques-Louis Audemars replaced his father as Technical Director in 1959. He also chaired the board starting in 1966.

By 1970, AP employed 86 people and produced 5,500 watches. In 1971, watchmaker Gérald Genta designed the Royal Oak for Audemars Piguet. The design helped the company rise to an important position in the watchmaking industry. In 1975, Jacqueline Dimier was appointed as the company's first female head of product design. In 1979, Paulette Gabrielle Piguet joined the board of directors as its first female member.

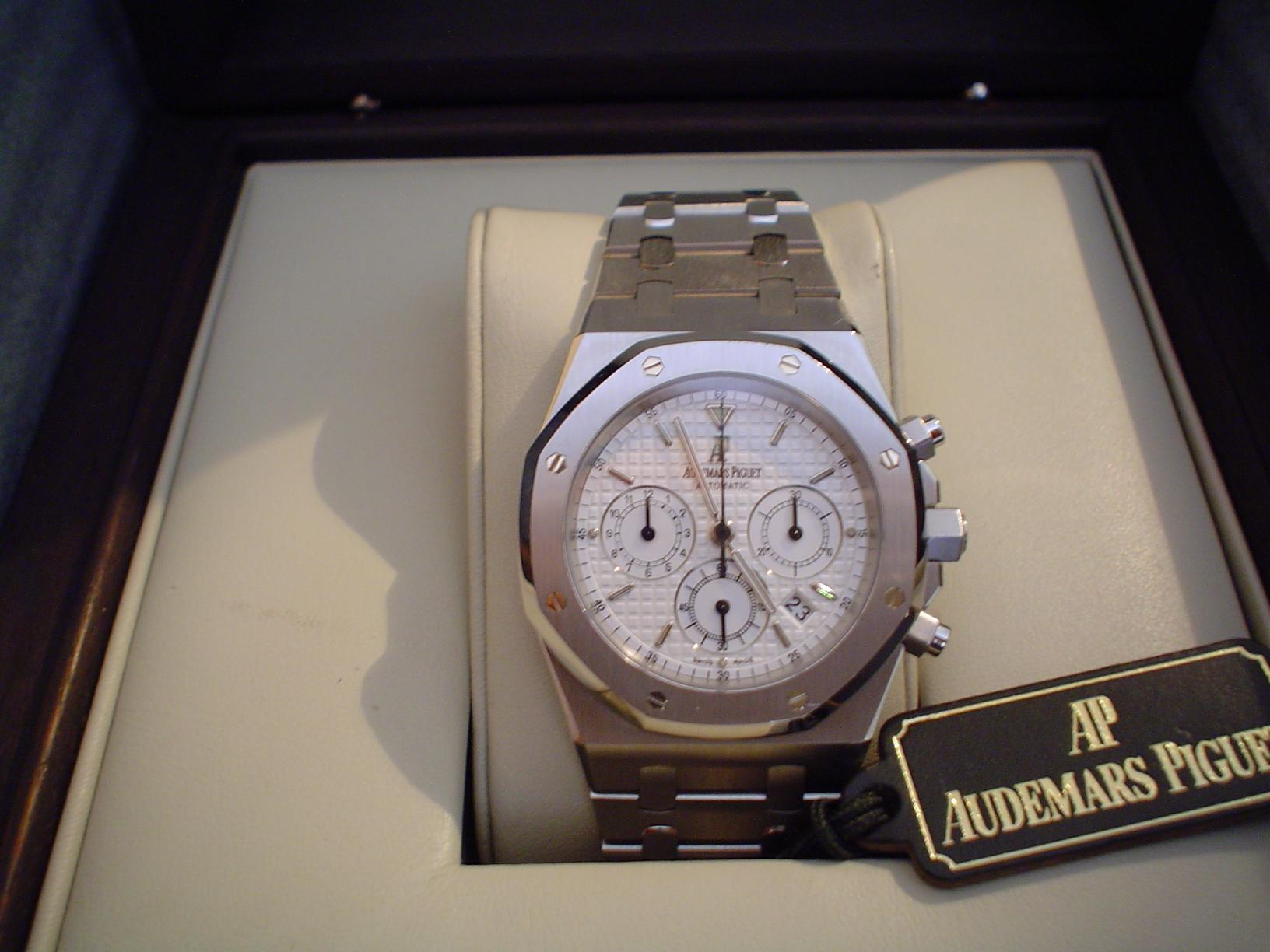
Audemars Piguet Royal Oak chronograph

AP acquired the Centror case manufacturing workshops of Geneva in 1991. In 1992, Jasmine Audemars, great-granddaughter of Jules Louis, was appointed chair of the board. Oliver Audemers, representing the Piguet family, also joined the board. Audemars Piguet became the majority shareholder of Renaud & Papi, a maker of complicated mechanical watches. APRP, located in Le Locle, continues to act as a research and development arm of the company.

=== 21st century ===
Audemars Piguet introduced the slogan "To Break the Rules, You Must First Master Them" in 2012.

Currently, the company is an active member of the Federation of the Swiss Watch Industry FH, and produces around 40,000 timepieces annually.

In 2017, the company began selling pre-owned watches, starting from its boutique in the Grand Hotel Kempinski in Geneva. In 2021, AP renamed its subsidiaries. Centror became Audemars Piguet Meyrin and Renaud & Papi was renamed Audemars Piguet Le Locle.

== Watch manufacturing ==
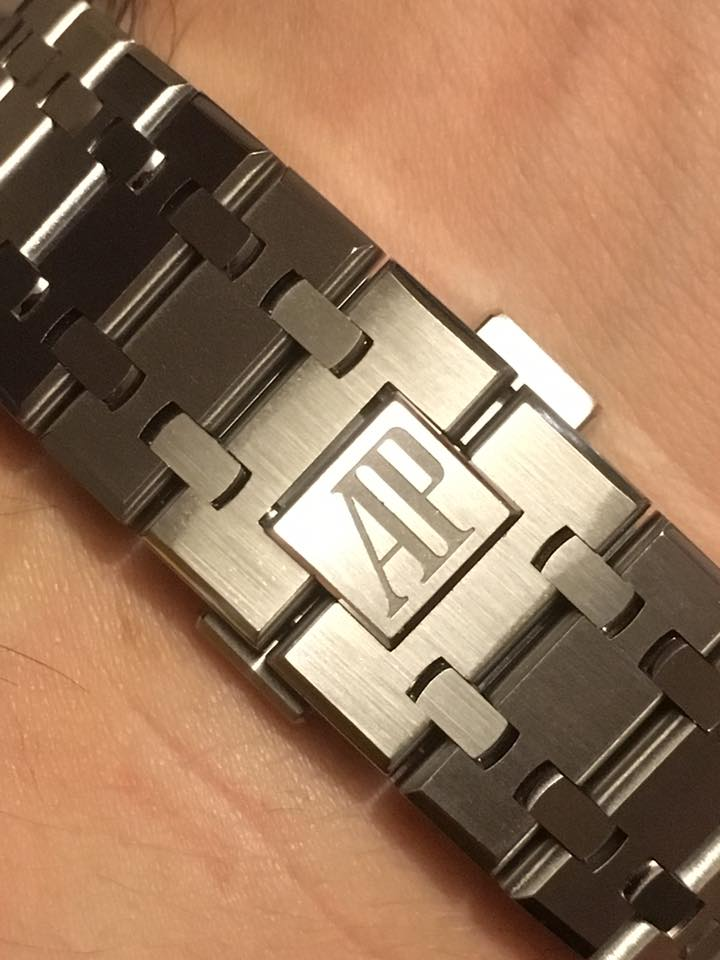
Bracelet on a Royal Oak

=== Notable inventions and patents ===
The following are some notable inventions of Audemars Piguet:

- In 1892, created the first wristwatch minute-repeating movement, which was then sold to Louis Brandt frères (Omega SA).
- In 1899, manufactured a "Grand Complication" pocket watch with seven complications, including a grand and small strike, minute repeater, alarm, perpetual calendar, deadbeat seconds, chronograph with jumping seconds, and split-seconds hand.
- In 1921, created the world's first jumping-hour wristwatch, driven by Calibre HPVM10'''.
- In 1934, introduced the first skeleton watch.
- In 1946, produced the thinnest watch, with a 1.64-mm-thick movement.
- In 1955, AP introduced its first perpetual calendar wristwatch, featuring a leap year indicator.
- In 1972, introduced the first luxury sport wristwatch, the Royal Oak. A women's version was introduced in 1976.
- In 1986, created an ultra-thin automatic tourbillon wristwatch (Calibre 2870), being only 5.3 mm thick (including the case).
- In 1995/96, manufactured the first automatic "Grande Complication" wristwatch (Calibre 2885).
- In 2006, introduced the first direct-impulse escapement, based on a design by watchmaker Robert Robin in the 18th century.
- In 2007/08, developed the first watch with a carbon case and a carbon movement (a Royal Oak Carbon Concept).
- In 2015, the first mechanical chronograph with independent memory and three column-wheels was launched, named Royal Oak Concept Laptimer Michael Schumacher. A redesigned Royal Oak Perpetual Calendar was also introduced.
- In 2019, presented the thinnest automatic perpetual calendar.

=== Environmental rating ===
In December 2018, World Wide Fund for Nature (WWF) released a report assigning environmental ratings for 15 major watch manufacturers and jewelers in Switzerland. Audemars Piguet was assigned the lowest environmental rating, "Latecomers/Non-transparent", suggesting the manufacturer had taken very few actions addressing the impact of its manufacturing activities on the environment and climate change.

== Notable models ==
=== Royal Oak/Concept/Offshore ===
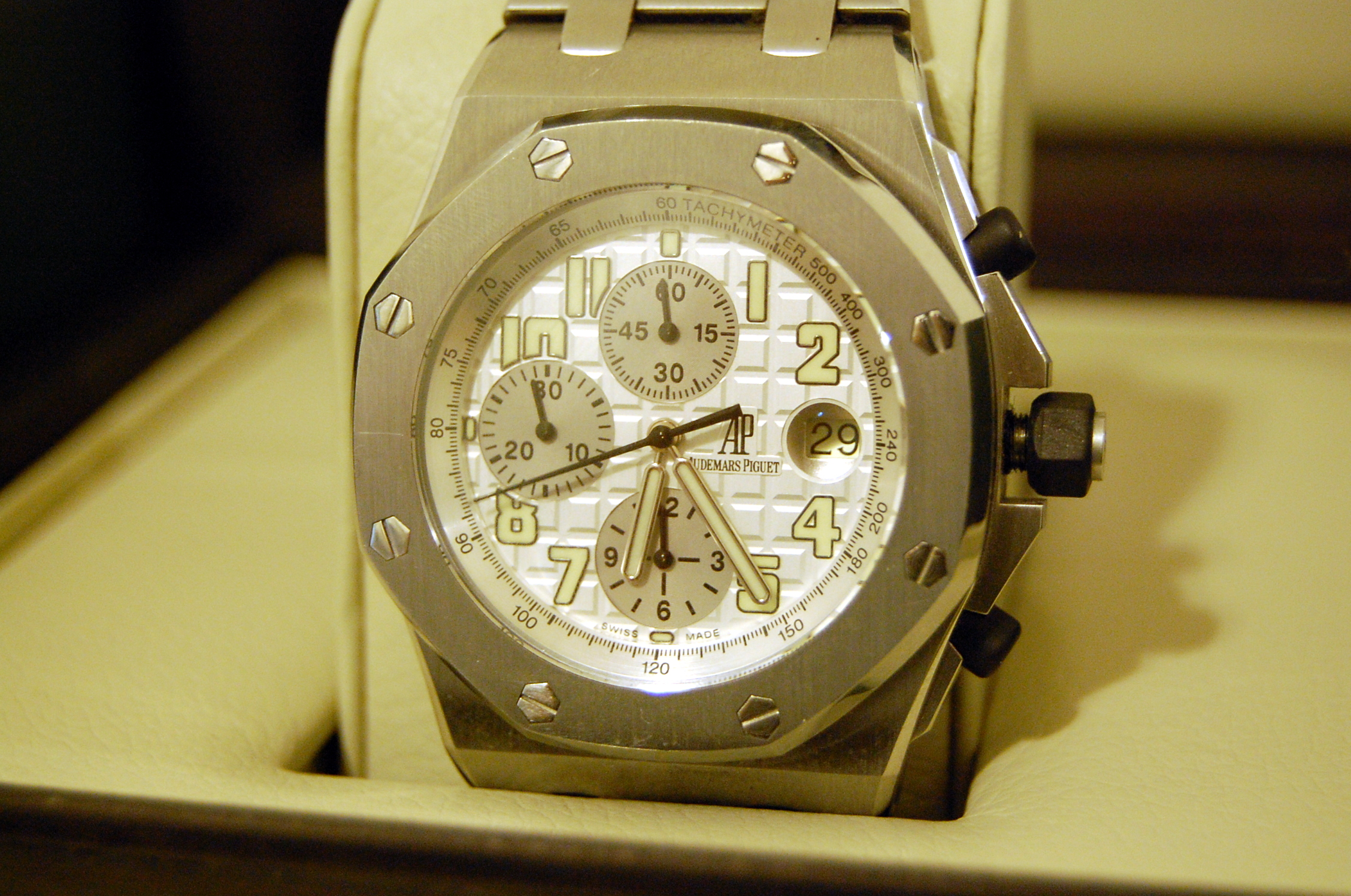
A Royal Oak Offshore chronograph

The Royal Oak is considered to be the most popular watch that Audemars Piguet currently manufactures. It was first presented at the 1972 Baselworld, during the quartz crisis. Designed by Gérald Genta, who is also responsible for designing other notable timepieces including the Patek Philippe Nautilus, the Royal Oak model is considered to be the first luxury sports watch in the world. It is named after warships, which in turn, reference Charles II's Royal Oak. The watch was inspired by traditional diving helmets and therefore featured exposed screw heads as well as a unique case design. The watch also featured an integrated steel bracelet.

A perpetual calendar model was introduced in 1984 followed by an openworked version in 1986. A leap year indicator for the Royal Oak was not added until 1995.

To mark the 20th anniversary of the Royal Oak, Audemars Piguet hired a young designer, Emmanuel Gueit, to design a new watch known as the Royal Oak Offshore. The Offshore was formally introduced in 1993, with a much larger case (42mm compared to the original 39mm) which was thought to be tougher than the original. The new watch proved to be just as successful as the original.

Due to its large case size, the Royal Oak Offshore was nicknamed "the Beast". Initial sales of the Royal Oak Offshore were slow, but after the first few years of production, numbers increased and began to demonstrate success. In the years following the launch, new variations of the Royal Oak Offshore were introduced. The "Tropical Beast" is widely considered the first novel variation of the Offshore and was introduced at Baselworld in 1996, showcasing a selection of bold, impactful colorways. Today, there are more than 130 variations within the Royal Oak Offshore line.

In 2002, Claude Emmenegger created a high-tech variant known as the Royal Oak Concept. It is known as a platform for innovation, helping to revive chiming watches. The Royal Oak Concept line is also known for its many collaborations, including a partnership with Marvel that led to a highly desirable Spiderman Tourbillon Royal Oak Concept watch. The Marvel partnership also extended to a Black Panther Royal Oak Concept watch, which was limited to 250 pieces and listed for $162,000 each in 2021. A white gold version of the Black Panther watch, limited to just one piece, was auctioned off for $5.2 million.

=== [Re]Master ===
The [Re]Master01, a self-winding chronograph, was launched in 2020 as a limited edition of 500. Subsequently the [Re]Master02, a tribute to a 1960 Brutalist-inspired watch, was launched in Spring 2024. This watch was issued as a limited edition of 250.

=== Code 11.59 ===
The Code 11.59 was released at the Salon International de la Haute Horlogerie (SIHH) 2019. All Code 11.59 watches feature a chapter ring with numerals depicting seconds for time-only models, a tachymeter (watch) for the chronograph model, and a week indicator for the perpetual calendar model. The crystal on the watches feature a unique curvature which changes the way the dial appears at certain angles. It also features a three-piece-case design with an octagonal section in the middle. It is based on a 1899 watch developed by Audemars Piguet for Union Dürrstein and won the Aiguille d'Or award in the 2023 Grand Prix d'Horlogerie de Genève.

=== Grosse Pièce ===
The Grosse Pièce pocket watch is the only watch made by Audemars Piguet with celestial complications. It established a new record for AP, becoming the most expensive watch from the company sold at an auction when it went for $7.7 million in December 2025.

== Collaborations ==
Over the years, Audemars Piguet has collaborated with many celebrities, musicians, athletes, and designers on limited edition releases.

=== Arnold Schwarzenegger ===
In 1999, AP created the Royal Oak Offshore 25922 End of Days for Arnold Schwarzenegger and the film End of Days. A run of 500 models were produced with an additional 21 made for the actor and his friends. The model was reimagined in 2023 for the 30th anniversary of the Royal Oak Offshore.

For his 2003 film Terminator 3: Rise of the Machines, AP worked with Schwarzenegger on the 1,000-piece titanium Royal Oak Offshore T3 Chronograph. That same year, they worked together on a yellow gold Royal Oak Offshore, but it was never advertised as a collaboration due to Schwarzenegger's election as the Governor of California. However, they did manage to release the Royal Oak Offshore 'Arnold's All-Stars' Chronograph through his charity. In 2011, they again collaborated on the 1,500-piece Royal Oak Offshore Arnold Schwarzenegger The Legacy Chronograph.

=== Juan Pablo Montoya ===
In 2004, Audemars Piguet partnered with Colombian racecar driver Juan Pablo Montoya to create the Royal Oak Offshore Juan Pablo Montoya. The company deviated in several ways from its existing Offshore models, creating a burlier look and introducing ceramic to the line. 500 units in rose gold and 1,000 units in titanium were produced.

=== Jay-Z ===
To celebrate his 10th anniversary in the music industry, Jay-Z worked with AP to release the Royal Oak Offshore Jay-Z 10th Anniversary Limited Edition in 2005. With just 100 produced, it had a small "10" in diamonds on the dial, came in stainless steel, rose gold, and platinum, and retailed for $23,500 to $69,500.

=== Rubens Barrichello ===
In 2006, AP worked with Brazilian Formula One driver Rubens Barrichello to release the Royal Oak Offshore Rubens Barrichello II. It had a limited run of 500 in 18k pink gold, 150 in 950 platinum, and 1000 in titanium.

=== Shaquille O'Neal ===
In 2007, the company partnered with Shaquille O'Neal on the Royal Oak Offshore 'Shaquille O'Neal' Chronograph. It came in white gold and stainless steel variants, had the positions of the 3 and 2 reversed to match his jersey number, and included a wood case made to look like a basketball.

=== Sachin Tendulkar ===
In 2008, AP partnered with Indian cricketer Sachin Tendulkar on a limited edition Royal Oak Offshore model to commemorate the 35th century of his career. They also released the 150-piecd Royal Oak Chronograph 'Sachin Tendulkar' in rose gold with brown dial and contrasting white square indexes.

=== Masato Kobayashi ===
In 2009, Audemars Piguet and Japanese kickboxer Masato Kobayashi released the Royal Oak Offshore Masato Chronograph Limited Edition. The stainless steel version had a 200-piece run, while only 20 were made for the diamond-set and white gold version.

=== Michael Schumacher ===
In 2012, AP and Formula One champion Michael Schumacher released the Royal Oak Offshore Michael Schumacher Limited Edition. It came in titanium, 18k rose gold, and platinum variations, and retailed for $42,500 to $110,000. The Audemars Piguet Royal Oak Concept Laptimer was released in 2015, featuring a chronograph that could track two separate events at the same time. This was something Schumacher had previously requested.

=== Lionel Messi ===
In 2012, Audemars Piguet and Lionel Messi released the 1,000-piece Royal Oak Leo Messi Limited Edition. Based on the 41mm Royal Oak chronograph, it came in steel, pink gold, and platinum.

=== LeBron James ===
In 2013, AP collaborated with LeBron James to release the Royal Oak Offshore Chronograph LeBron James. Retailing at $51,500, the 600-piece limited edition featured a 18k pink gold case, titanium bezels, black ceramic crown and chronograph pushers, and a gray crocodile strap.

=== Carolina Bucci ===
In 2016, to commemorate the 40th anniversary of the Royal Oak, Audemars Piguet collaborated with jewellery designer Carolina Bucci to release the Royal Oak Frosted Gold. She also created a 300-piece limited edition of the Royal Oak with a mirror dial in 2018. They collaborated again in 2022 to release the Royal Oak Selfwinding Carolina Bucci Limited Edition.

=== Gims ===
In 2020, AP and French rapper Gims game together to create the one-off Royal Oak Offshore 'Gims' Chronograph.

=== Marvel ===
In 2021, AP released the Royal Oak Concept Black Panther Flying Tourbillon based on the Black Panther character from Marvel Comics. The version with a titanium case was limited to 250-piece run and a one-off white gold version was auctioned off for charity. In 2023, AP produced a Royal Oak Concept Royal Oak Concept Spider Man Flying Tourbillon based on Marvel's Spider-Man. It had a 250-piece run and a piece unique black suit version.

=== Travis Scott ===
Audemars Piguet and rapper Travis Scott collaborated on the Royal Oak Travis Scott Cactus Jack Perpetual Calendar in 2023. The 200-piece run introduced a chocolate brown case to the Brand's catalog.

=== Matthew Williams ===
Audemars Piguet and streetwear designer Matthew Williams worked on the Royal Oak Offshore '1017 ALYX 9SM' Chronograph. Released in 2023, thee watch had a minimalist aesthetic with five variations in coloring and size.

=== KAWS ===
In 2024, AP worked with designer and artist KAWS to create the 250-piece Audemars Piguet Royal Oak Concept Tourbillon KAWS, which features the Companion cartoon character on the watch face.

=== John Mayer ===
In 2024, AP and musician John Mayer collaborated on the Royal Oak Perpetual Calendar "John Mayer" Limited Edition, noted for being the very last Royal Oak Perpetual Calendar equipped with the automatic caliber 5134 before its discontinuation. The release was limited to 200 watches in 18k white gold and was priced at $180,700.

=== Tamara Ralph ===
In 2024, AP worked with Australian fashion designer Tamara Ralph to create the Royal Oak Concept Flying Tourbillon Tamara Ralph. The 102-piece limited edition had a rose gold case and featured overlapping off-center circles to make up the face.

=== Audemars Piguet x Swatch Royal Pop ===
In May 2026, Audemars Piguet and Swatch officially announced their "Royal Pop" collaboration. The co-branded watches are on lanyards, rather than straps, and come in bright and colorful versions. They are marketed as necklaces, pocket watches, and bag charms, rather than as wristwatches. Each watch also comes with a stand, allowing it to be used as a desk clock.

From a design standpoint, the Royal Pop watches combine the Petite Tapisserie dial and octagonal bezel of AP's Royal Oak with Swatch's Sistem51 mechanical movement. The models come in two styles: one where the crown is at 12 o'clock and another where the crown is at 3 o'clock.

The Royal Pop officially went on sale on May 16, 2026 and is only available at physical Swatch stores. It costs between $400 and $420.

The collaboration has proven to be highly divisive among collectors. Some argue that bringing a high-end maison into the mass market could dilute AP's high-horology status, especially as the collaboration links the brand with a much lower-priced watchmaker. Others see it as a smart move for both brands. For AP, it may ultimately attract a new generation of watch buyers thanks to the more affordable price.

== Facilities ==
Audemars Piguet has been based in Le Brassus since its founding. The company's oldest building was constructed there in 1868. The first Audemars Piguet Manufacture was built in 1907, which remains the company's headquarters.

The Manufacture des Forges was built in Le Brassus in 2008. In 2020, the company opened Musée Atelier Audemars Piguet, a museum and workroom in Le Brassus, Switzerland. The building was designed by Danish architect Bjarke Ingels. The nearby Hôtel des Horlogers, owned by AP, was rebuilt and reopened in 2022.

In 2022, AP opened a manufacturing facility in Le Locle. In January 2026, the company officially unveiled its Arc Manufacture building in La Brassus, which connects and wraps around the existing facility. A renovated facility in Meyrin was opened in March to focus on manufacturing cases and bracelets.

== Retail ==
=== Boutiques ===
In order to establish a closer connection with its customers, Audemars Piguet expanded into retail during the 1990s. Its first boutique opened in Geneva in 1993. This was followed by locations in Milan (2005), Singapore (2006), Kuala Lumpur (2007), Tokyo (2007), Taipei (2008), New York (2010). After adding hundreds of boutiques around the world, the firm has gradually decreased this number over the years.

=== AP Houses ===
In recent years, Audemars Piguet has begun setting up lounges in major world cities designed to look like the inside of a house. It began opening lounges in 2018. Clients are able to schedule appointments at no charge and can use these spaces without purchasing anything. The first location was in Milan, followed by New York, Madrid, London, Hong Kong, Zurich, and Munich.

By 2026, these AP Houses were also located in Amsterdam, Atlanta, Bangkok, Barcelona, Los Angeles, Manchester, Milan, Mexico City, Munich, Shanghai, Singapore, Seoul, and Tokyo.

In March 2026, AP officially moved its London lounge from New Bond Street to Clifford Street in Mayfair. It also opened another US-based location in Miami.

== See also ==
- List of watch manufacturers
- Manufacture d'horlogerie
