= Midas (disambiguation) =

Midas, king of Phrygia, also a figure from Greek mythology.

Midas may also refer to:

== Arts and fiction ==
- Midas (comics), the name of two fictional characters in the Marvel Universe
- Midas (DC Comics), a fictional character from DC Comics
- Midas, a fictional planet in the Colony Wars franchise

=== Film, TV and theatre ===
- Midas (burletta), a 1760 "mock opera" by Kane O'Hara
- Midas (Lyly play), an Elizabethan stage play by John Lyly
- Midas (Shelley play), an 1820 play by Mary Shelley and Percy Bysshe Shelley
- Midas (TV series), a 2011 South Korean TV series
- Midas, a rich patron of the arts in the operetta Die schöne Galathée, by Franz von Suppé

=== Music ===
- Midas (DJs), a British happy hardcore duo
- Midas (English band), an English indie rock band
- Midas (Japanese band), a Japanese progressive rock band

== Places ==
- Midas, California, an unincorporated community in Placer County, California, United States
- Midas, Kentucky, an unincorporated community in Floyd County, Kentucky, United States
- Midas, Nevada, an unincorporated community in Elko County, Nevada, United States
- Other name for Midès oasis in Tunisia, the Ancient Numidian city Mades

== Companies and transport ==
- Midas (automotive service), a chain of automotive service centers
- Midas Cars, a British car manufacturer
- Midas Consoles, a manufacturer of audio consoles
- MS Midas, a Finnish cargo ship
- Midas, NATO reporting name for Ilyushin Il-78

== Finance ==
- Midas (banking system), a core-banking solution from Misys International Banking systems
- Midas formula, a financial-analysis formula
- Midas List, an annual list of dealmakers in high-tech and life science

== Acronyms ==
- Maximum Integrated Data Acquisition System, an open source data acquisition system used in particle and nuclear physics
- Micro-Imaging Dust Analysis System
- MIDAS (operating system) (Microsoft Interrupt Driven Asynchronous System), a 1979 operating system
- MIDAS Heritage a Monument Inventory Data Standard for recording historic sites
- Missile Defense Alarm System (MiDAS), 1960–1966 American early-warning missile-launch detection system
- Migraine Disability Assessment Test
- Minibus Driver Awareness Scheme, a training and registration scheme for drivers of minibuses
- Mixed-data sampling, an econometric regression or filtering method
- Motorway Incident Detection and Automatic Signalling, a distributed network of traffic sensors
- Multics Intrusion Detection and Alerting System, see Intrusion detection system

== Other ==
- 1981 Midas, an asteroid discovered in 1973
- European Association of Daily Newspapers in Minority and Regional Languages (MIDAS)
- Midas, NATO reporting name for Ilyushin Il-78 aerial refueling tanker
- Midas Touch, originally Midas Touch Golden Elixir, a beer produced by Dogfish Head Brewery
- MidasWWW, one of the first web browsers
- Operation Midas, an anti-corruption investigation of the National Anti-Corruption Bureau of Ukraine

== See also ==
- The Midas Touch (disambiguation)
- Midus, a type of Lithuanian mead
