= Mortgagebot =

Mortgagebot is an online mortgage-handling platform used by banks and credit unions. Mortgagebot is used by regulated banks and credit unions in the United States.

== History ==
In 1997, Mortgagebot was formed as the mortgage subsidiary of M&I Bank. The bank's consumer-direct system for taking mortgage applications was originally developed to enable M&I's mortgage business to take advantage of the growth of the Internet.

In 2001, Mortgagebot was spun off from M&I Bank in a management-led buyout.

In April 2011, Davis + Henderson acquired Mortgagebot LLC for $231.8 million in cash.

In 2014, D+H Mortgagebot became D+H. At that time, Mortgagebot was used by 1,400 banks and credit unions throughout the United States, originating over US$150 billion in mortgage applications annually.

In 2017, D+H merged with Misys to become Finastra.

== Products ==
Direct: An online application, pricing, and approval program that personalizes the mortgage-application process based on borrower information and transaction type.

Advisor: A program that enables branch-based bank or credit-union associates to take accurate mortgage applications from borrowers.

Pro: A program designed to automate the mortgage-application process for professional loan officers.

Mobile: A program that enables mortgage lenders to deliver real-time mortgage-pricing information to consumers in an easy-to-understand format that is optimized for mobile devices.

== Awards ==
- Winner, Mortgage Technology magazine: “10X” Award (2001), “Synergy” Award (2002), “Lasting Impact” Award (2005)
- Repeat winner: Mortgage Technology magazine’s “Top Service Provider” Award (2005–2010)
- Inc. 500: America’s Fastest Growing Companies (2006)
- Repeat winner, Metro Milwaukee Association of Commerce (MMAC) “Future 50” Award (2005–07)
- Winner, Finovate 2007 “Best in Show” Award
- Winner, Milwaukee Magazine “Best Places to Work in Southeastern Wisconsin” Award (2008)
- Winner, Cornerstone Advisors’ “Walking the Vendor Walk” Award (2009)
- Designated “Hot Banking Tech Company to Watch in 2010” by Forrester Research
- Winner, Milwaukee Journal Sentinel “Top Workplace in Southeastern Wisconsin” Award (2010)
- Inc. 5000: America’s Fastest Growing Companies (2010)

== See also ==
- Mortgage broker
- Holo (company)
- Property technology
- Better.com
