= Midas (banking system) =

British banking software system

Midas is a line of banking software that was provided by British software company Misys corporation. It was initially developed in the 1970s and gained significant market share through the 1980s and 1990s. The system includes a core banking system and supporting back office systems for treasury and international banking.

The use of the software declined from 2001 onwards as more modern competitor products became available, but the system continued with existing banks well into the 2010s. In 2017 Misys was merged with Davis & Henders to form Finastra and the Midas software was renamed as Fusion Midas.

== History ==
=== Foundation ===
Kingsley-Smith and Associates (KSA) was formed in 1972, initially as a full software service company comprising five people serving manufacturing, banks and insurance companies within the UK. By 1973, the company had expanded to around twenty personnel, and begun to focus on UK banks and foreign banks which had operational activities in London.

KSA realised a gap existed in packaged software aimed specifically at banks, at the same time as IBM released its System/32, later known as IBM 5320, as a new small PC system which could easily be programmed in RPG. The original five Kingsley-Smith and Associates members were Brian Kingsley-Smith, David Eley, David Mitchell, David Shaw, and David Harington.

=== Initial development ===
The MIDAS banking system was designed in 1975 at Kingsley Smith and Associates by Barrington (Barry) Fludgate. It was the brainchild of Achie Reid a then director of KSA. The system was originally going to be called FALCON, since SWIFT had just been announced, but at the last minute was changed to MIDAS (Modular International Dealing and Accounting System), the name was suggested by Jeremy Blackman, one of the two original programmers on the development.

The development phase consisted of three people, Barry (designer and architect), Jeremy (technical programmer) and John Gilbert (business programmer) The system was built for the newly announced IBM System 32 in RPGII. The first sale was made to Australia and New Zealand Bank in early 1976 and was installed and running live in their New York office in the summer of 1976.

The KSA development of MIDAS banking system had nothing to do with the Management Information Distributor Accounting System (MIDAS) software system created by David Shaw in 1972 for Jaguar Rover Triumph.

=== BIS Banking Systems ===
In 1976 KSA and Midas was sold to the BIS Group. The company was called BIS Software and the main office was in Lincolns Inn Fields with software development based at York House near Waterloo; convenient for the City of London. The Managing Director of BIS Software was John Prosser with the charismatic Stan Smith as the Sales Director. David Tebbs (see ITNEA) became CEO in 1983 and later moved the business to Wimbledon and the company was renamed BIS Banking Systems. In 1988 the BIS Group was bought by Nynex, an offshoot of the recently demerged AT&T, and by this time the Midas banking packages supplied 900+ of the world's 1,000 largest banks.

=== Leadership phase 1970s and 1980s ===
Midas became the standard package for banks off shore operations (and some domestic wholesale banking operations) worldwide by the end of the 1970s, and thanks to that early leadership it has been argued that Midas is (or was) the world's most successful banking system. In the 1970s and 1980s the Midas family of banking-packages led the market with more worldwide customers, more awards, and more capability than any other. Thanks to the inertia of banks, 10 year renewals and cost of migration by some accounts it could claim to have kept this leadership position into the 1990s. The system had broader functionality (and sometimes deeper) than most of the packages initially available on packaged systems. It reduced risks bringing efficiency due to a fairly standardised and comparatively automated process cycle.

=== Offshore expansion 1990s ===
In 1990 BIS opened an offshore maintenance center in Makati City, Philippines. This pioneering move in the banking software industry was not capitalized on quickly and for the next decade the location was little more than a coding shop taking orders from the UK. It did however provide a cheap pool of resources amenable to spending months/years on site coding modifications and fixes. By the end of the decade no two Midas user sites ran the same code base and Midas maintained large staff numbers in most financial centers.

In 1993 BIS Banking Systems was purchased by ACT which had previously purchased Kindle Banking Systems and a handful of other banking applications. The organisation was fragmented with some parts of the organisation called ACT International and some labelled ACT Financial Systems.

In 1994 ACT bought Kapiti Ltd, who owned the Equation product line. The IBM AS/400 based products, Equation from Kapiti and Midas from ACT/BIS were united into the Midas Kapiti International (MKI) business. Technical and functional comparisons between Midas and Equation followed. It was no surprise that Equation had zoomed past Midas in terms of core banking functionality (payments, lending, customer management, deposits, tellering), but it was something of a shock for the Midas team to see how the Midas user interface, the flat file data base and the system architecture in general had fallen behind Equation - and by implication fallen behind other competitors. Multiple Midas catch up projects followed to retro fit basic features like product templates, customer centric banking and application program interfaces (API's) into the aging platform. The federated Midas data base however was considered beyond redemption and remains fragmented and poorly documented.

Midas has a very broad coverage of banking business areas. In the 70s and 80s it had provided market leading functionality in several of those areas. However, in the late 1990s other packaged systems within Misys and from other vendors caught up with and overtook Midas in areas like retail banking, customer and party management, work flow and most significantly treasury. Despite this in the early 1990s Midas maintained a leadership position or close to leadership position in terms of annual new names sales and installed base size.

=== Misys International Banking Systems – 2001 decline ===
On 1 October 2001, Midas-Kapiti International [MKI] was renamed as Misys International Banking Systems. The new name formed part of an extensive re-branding exercise undertaken by the company, which also embraced sister companies MKI Frustum and the Credo Group, becoming unified under the new brand name.

Midas had built up a large user base of international branch banking and treasury operations in the previous decades. Treasury focused users in the Midas user base came under attack from cheaper Windows and Unix based systems with better coverage of the newer classes of financial instruments like derivatives. Although Midas had some retail functionality the Midas team underestimated the complexity of retail banking software, importance of work flow and automation resulting in the stalling of multiple Midas retail banking initiatives. Overall the Midas customer numbers were in decline. In the late 1990s Midas was the first core banking system to introduce global processing to the core banking industry but this did nothing to stop the decline.

=== 2010 onwards – stasis ===
Two technology refreshes Midas Plus and BankFusion Midas have staunched the flow of defections from the existing user base and some existing user banks are expanding usage of the system. However, there have been very few new name users after 2010, nonetheless the legacy installed base is still large compared to most competitor system when measured by numbers of banks, user banks profiles and the re-occurring revenue stream. In 2017 the company was merged and renamed as Finastra and the Midas system incorporated into the product set, however by 2022 Finestra was looking to sell the banking business that included Midas.
