= Spotahome (platform) =

Spanish online rental platform

- Type: Private
- Industry: Real estate, proptech
- Founded: 5 March 2014; 12 years ago in Madrid, Spain
- Founders: Alejandro Artacho; Bruno Bianchi; Hugo Monteiro; Bryan McEire
- Headquarters: Madrid, Spain
- Key people: Eduardo Garbayo (CEO)
- Products: Online rental marketplace
- Subsidiaries: Erasmusu
- Website: www.spotahome.com

Spotahome is a Spanish online marketplace for medium- and long-term residential rentals. The platform lists apartments, rooms and student residences for stays of at least 30 days, which tenants book without an in-person viewing, relying instead on videos, 360-degree photographs and floor plans produced by inspectors.

== History ==
Spotahome was founded in 2014 by Alejandro Artacho of Spain, Bruno Bianchi of Argentina and Italy, Hugo Monteiro of Portugal and Bryan McEire of Costa Rica.

In 2016, the company won the startup competition at South Summit in Madrid. In October 2017, Spotahome raised US$16 million in a round led by Passion Capital and Seaya Ventures, bringing its total funding to $25 million. At the time, it operated in 16 cities in nine countries and listed about 40,000 properties.

In March 2018, Spotahome acquired Erasmusu, an online community for international students founded in Murcia. In June 2018, the company closed a $40 million Series B round led by Kleiner Perkins, with participation from Passion Capital and Seaya Ventures. By then the platform listed more than 50,000 properties in 33 cities across 17 countries.

In September 2019, the company opened an office in Lisbon and appointed Miguel Costa as general manager for Portugal. In October 2021, Spotahome raised €25 million (about $29 million) in a round joined by Mundi Ventures, taking total funding past $92 million. The company become profitable in the third quarter of 2021.

In January 2026, co-founder Alejandro Artacho stepped down as chief executive. He was succeeded by Eduardo Garbayo, a former Boston Consulting Group consultant and BBVA executive who had previously served as the company's general manager for Iberia and chief operating officer. The company had revenue of more than €17 million for 2025.

== Operations ==
The platform mainly serves international students, relocating workers and remote professionals. Each listing is visited by a homechecker who records a video tour, takes photographs and draws a floor plan. Booking and payment are handled online.

=== Portugal ===
Spotahome entered Portugal in 2018 after acquiring Erasmusu, and by August that year listed more than 500 properties in Lisbon and about 100 in Porto. By January 2022, it listed about 6,000 properties in Lisbon, Porto and Coimbra and had recorded more than 12,000 bookings in the country, 47 percent of them by students. In 2023, it launched Spotahome Plus in Portugal. The service guarantees rent payment to landlords, covers up to two months of damage, and lets tenants book without a deposit. Portuguese media have grouped Spotahome with other mid-term rental platforms such as Inlife and Flatio.

=== France ===
In 2018, Spotahome operated in Paris, Lyon and Lille, with more than 2,400 properties listed in France.

== See also ==
- Proptech
- Renting
