= Andrew Baum =

British academic

Andrew Baum is a British academic. He is Emeritus Professor and former professor of Practice at the Saïd Business School, University of Oxford. His research is primarily focused on property funds, development and technology, property finance and international real estate investment.

He received the UK PropTech Association Special Achievement Award in 2019.

== Career ==
Andrew Baum was a lecturer at the University of Reading from 1975 to 1985. From 1985 to 1987, he served as the Reader at the Centre for Property Valuation and Management at the City University, London. He was appointed to the chair in Land Management at the Henley Business School, University of Reading from 1989 to 2013 and was appointed Emeritus Professor at the University of Reading in 2013.

He served as the Honorary Professor of Real Estate Investment at the University of Cambridge from 2009 to 2014. In 2013, he was appointed as the visiting professor of Management Practice at the Saïd Business School, University of Oxford in 2013. In June 2018, Baum was appointed as Professor of Practice at the Saïd Business School, University of Oxford, and Emeritus Professor in 2021.

== Publications ==
- Proptech 3.0: The Future of Real Estate, (Saïd Business School, University of Oxford, 2017)
- Real Estate Investment: A Strategic Approach, Routledge, 2022 fourth edition
- The Income Approach to Property Valuation (with Mackmin, D and Nunnington, N), Elsevier, 2018 seventh edition
- Real Estate Investment: Strategies, Structures, Decisions (with Hartzell, D), Wiley Blackwell, 2021 second edition
- Property Investment Appraisal (with Crosby, N), Blackwell Publishing, 2021 fourth edition
- Statutory Valuations (with Sams, G), Elsevier, 2007 fourth edition
- Freeman's Guide to the Property Industry (ed), Freeman Publishing, 2001 second edition
- Baum, Andrew E. (1991). Property Investment Depreciation and Obsolescence. Routledge. ISBN 978-0-415-04802-6.
