= Norman G. Miller =

American real estate economist

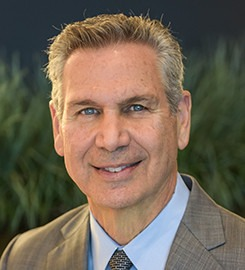
- Miller in 2024
- Born: Cincinnati, Ohio, U.S.
- Known for: Co-author of Commercial Real Estate Analysis and Investment; Founding editor of the Journal of Sustainable Real Estate; Research on green building economics and proptech
- Awards: James A. Graaskamp Award (2015); Richard Ratcliff Award (2013); American Real Estate Society Educators Award (2020); NAIOP Distinguished Fellow (2001)

Academic background
- Education: Ohio State University (B.S. 1973, M.S. 1974, M.B.A. 1974, Ph.D. 1977)
- Thesis: (1977)

Academic work
- Institutions: University of San Diego (2007-2022); University of Cincinnati (1980-2007); University of Georgia (1978-1980)

Norman G. Miller is an American real estate economist. He holds the title of Ernest W. Hahn Professor Emeritus of Real Estate Finance at the University of San Diego’s Burnham-Moores Center for Real Estate, while also serving as vice president and faculty member of the Homer Hoyt Institute. He co-authored the graduate-level textbook Commercial Real Estate Analysis and Investment, a standard resource assigned across numerous real estate master’s degree programs. In addition, he established the Journal of Sustainable Real Estate as its founding editor.

Miller devoted much of his professional life to building and directing real estate academic programs. He created the Real Estate Center at the University of Cincinnati in 1980 and later became the first holder of the Ernest W. Hahn Chair at the University of San Diego, a role he occupied from 2011 until 2022. His expert commentary in commercial real estate industry publications has addressed subjects that include big data applications, cybersecurity concerns, the effects of autonomous vehicles on infrastructure, and projections for multifamily housing demand.

Studies by Miller on the economic returns of green buildings, challenges in housing affordability, behavioral aspects of real estate decisions, and the incorporation of ESG criteria into property analysis have collectively attracted more than 3,000 citations. He has provided consulting services to pension funds, real estate investment trusts, property developers, the Federal Deposit Insurance Corporation, and the United States Department of Justice. He maintains an active role as a strategic consultant focused on real estate technology developments and related public policy matters.

== Early life and education ==
Born and raised in Cincinnati, Ohio, Miller completed his secondary education at Walnut Hills High School in 1969. He subsequently earned four separate degrees from Ohio State University: a B.S. in Real Estate and Urban Analysis awarded in 1973, an M.S. in Finance in 1974, an M.B.A. also in 1974, and a Ph.D. in Finance that included a concentration in real estate together with a minor in City and Regional Planning, conferred in 1977.

== Career ==
Miller launched his teaching career in 1978 as an assistant professor of real estate at the University of Georgia, remaining there until 1980. That same year he accepted a position at the University of Cincinnati, where he established and led the institution’s Real Estate Program and Center. He occupied the West Shell Jr. Professorship of Real Estate from 1988 through 2007 and, for a short period, acted as chair of the Department of Finance.

During 2003 Miller held a visiting professorship at DePaul University.

In 2007 he relocated to the University of San Diego to become the founding academic director of the Burnham-Moores Center for Real Estate. Between 2009 and 2011 he worked part-time as vice president of analytics at CoStar Group while continuing limited teaching duties. He resumed full-time faculty responsibilities at USD in 2011 upon appointment to the Ernest W. Hahn Chair and retired with emeritus status in 2022.

Since 2005 Miller has held the office of Vice-President at the Homer Hoyt Institute. He previously served a term as president of the American Real Estate Society.

== Research and publications ==
Miller’s scholarly work centers on property valuation methods, the financial aspects of sustainable construction, housing affordability issues, and the ways emerging technologies reshape real estate markets. Two of his papers, “Does Green Pay Off?” published in 2008, and “Green Buildings and Productivity”, rank among the most frequently referenced studies that helped build the economic justification for adopting energy-efficient designs in commercial properties.

Together with David Geltner, Piet Eichholtz, and additional collaborators, he produced the textbook Commercial Real Estate Analysis and Investment. The fourth edition was released in 2025. Earlier versions of the book were noted for combining a strong theoretical foundation with direct applicability for both classroom instruction and professional practice.

He created the Journal of Sustainable Real Estate in 2008, and remained its editor through 2018. The periodical features cross-disciplinary scholarship on sustainability topics within the built environment and is preserved in the JSTOR digital archive.

Miller’s analyses and public statements regarding future multifamily housing demand, the implications of autonomous vehicles, and potential cybersecurity vulnerabilities in the sector have appeared regularly in specialized commercial real estate outlets.

== Awards and honors ==
Among the distinctions Miller has received are the American Real Estate Society’s James A. Graaskamp Award in 2015, the Richard Ratcliff Award in 2013, and the Educators Award in 2020. In 2001 he was designated a Distinguished Fellow by NAIOP and later earned its Impact Award in 2004.

== Personal life ==
Miller resides in Encinitas, California and continues to participate on boards and advisory panels dealing with real estate technology and policy questions.
