= Ruth Obih =

Nigerian real estate entrepreneur

- Born: 1978 (age 47–48)
- Occupation: Real estate entrepreneur
- Organization: 3INVEST
- Known for: Founding 3INVEST

Ruth Obih is a lawyer, sustainability advocate and the founder and CEO of 3Invest, a real estate investment company in Nigeria.

== Education ==
She graduated with a LLB from the Imo State University and proceeded to the Nigerian Law School, in 2004, where she was called to bar. After her call to bar in Nigeria, she proceeded to the BPP Law School, London, UK. She has a certificate in entrepreneurial management from the Pan-Atlantic University, real estate management from the program from the Harvard Business School and commercial real estate analysis and investment from MIT School of Architecture and planning, Boston.

== Career ==
After her training at Ajumogobia and Okeke law practice in Lagos. She started 3Invest in 2007. With the aim to create a thriving real estate sector, she committed resources in real estate advocacy. In 2011 she led the globalisation and digitisation of the real estate industry with the launch of 3invest’s online information portal and the first syndicate real estate radio show, Real Estate On-Air, with its flagship station on Classic 97.3 FM and Beat 99.9 FM, both in Lagos. In 2012 she led her team to launch Real Estate Unite, the largest annual gathering of real estate leaders in Africa hosted in Lagos. Following her passion for proptech, in 2013 she launched the Real Estate Investor Network (REIN) and later on in 2015 launched the first timeshare coworking space in Africa called Lagos CoWork.

== Awards and recognitions ==
- Featured by Forbes Africa (2012)
- Honoured Most Aspiring business person of the year (2012)
- Featured Business Day Leading Women (2013)
- Listed as one of 100 most influential Women in Nigeria by #YWOMEN (2015)
- THISDAY's Real Estate Women who make it happen (2015)
- Recognised for her contribution towards solving issues affecting the Social/Affordable housing delivery in Nigeria through the annual Real Estate Unite Summit by Social Housing Day.
- Honoured as Woman that inspire in Real Estate by Eloy Awards (2015)
