= Michael Hunter (entrepreneur) =

- Occupations: Entrepreneur, mortgage industry executive
- Known for: Co-founder of Holo

Michael Hunter is an entrepreneur and mortgage industry executive based in the United Arab Emirates. He is the co-founder and chief executive officer of Holo, a Dubai-based digital mortgage company.

== Career ==
Before co-founding Holo, Hunter worked in banking and mortgage brokerage across the Middle East and North Africa for more than a decade, according to Arab News. He and fellow co-founder Arran Summerhill had previously worked for mortgage brokerage firms in the United Kingdom and the UAE.

Hunter and Summerhill co-founded Holo, which launched its digital mortgage platform in the UAE in 2020. Hunter attributed the decision to establish the business to lengthy processing times, limited transparency and fragmentation in the home-buying process. During the COVID-19 pandemic, Arabian Business reported an increase in mortgage applications processed through Holo.

As mortgage rates declined in early 2021, Hunter discussed the availability of lower-rate home loans and digital applications for refinancing. In December, he commented on anticipated interest-rate increases and their potential effects on UAE homebuyers. Following a rate increase in May 2022, he discussed the financial implications for borrowers and recommended fixed-rate mortgage agreements to limit exposure to further increases.

In May 2023, Hunter discussed changes in buyer preferences, mortgage-backed transactions and the shift toward shorter fixed-interest-rate periods in Dubai's property market. Two months later, he commented on mortgage eligibility requirements for new UAE residents, including salary history requirements and restrictions affecting self-employed applicants. He noted that some lenders had begun accepting shorter salary payment histories, although mortgage options for new residents remained limited. In November, Gulf Newscited him regarding the effects of higher interest rates on refinancing activity and mortgage transaction volumes in Dubai.

In September 2024, Arab News profiled Hunter in connection with Holo's expansion into Saudi Arabia, reporting his views on differences between the Saudi and UAE mortgage markets. In November, Hunter and Summerhill discussed the development of property technology and digital mortgage services in the Gulf in an interview with Finance Middle East. The following month, Hunter commented on mortgage refinancing after reductions in UAE interest rates, including the differences between fixed and variable rates and the costs of switching lenders.

In August 2025, Hunter explained to the Khaleej Times how digital mortgage platforms assess applicant eligibility against lender criteria and generate financing options.
