= Letswork =

Dubai-based coworking platform

- Type: Private
- Industry: Proptech, Coworking
- Founded: 2019 in Dubai, United Arab Emirates
- Founders: Omar Al Mheiri, Hamza Khan
- Headquarters: Dubai, United Arab Emirates
- Area served: UAE, Saudi Arabia, Bahrain, Pakistan, Portugal, Spain
- Products: Coworking memberships, meeting room bookings, private offices, creative studios
- Website: www.letswork.io

Letswork is a Dubai-based proptech startup that operates a subscription-based flexible workspace platform. The company connects remote workers, freelancers, startups, and enterprise teams with a network of over 500 coworking spaces, cafés, hotels, and meeting rooms across the United Arab Emirates, Saudi Arabia, Bahrain, Pakistan, Portugal, and Spain. Members access all venues through a single membership and a credit-based booking system.

Unlike traditional coworking providers that own or lease dedicated office space, Letswork partners with existing hospitality and F&B businesses to transform underutilized daytime capacity into productive work environments.

== History ==
=== Founding ===
Letswork was founded in 2019 by Emirati Omar Al Mheiri and British Hamza Khan while they were participants in Emaar Properties' E25 entrepreneurship programme, an initiative set up by Emaar founder Mohamed Alabbar to support aspiring entrepreneurs under the age of 25. Struggling to find affordable, flexible workspaces in Dubai, the co-founders noticed that many of the city's restaurants and hotels sat empty during daytime hours and conceived the idea of partnering with these venues to convert idle capacity into coworking spaces.

The company was one of three startups to launch out of Emaar's E25 programme. It quickly established partnerships with hotel groups including Hilton, Marriott, Accor, and Emaar Hospitality Group.

=== Expansion and acquisition of Krow ===
In February 2022, Letswork expanded into Europe by acquiring Krow, a Portugal-based coworking competitor, for an undisclosed amount. As part of the deal, Krow co-founders Paulo Palha and Joana Balaguer joined Letswork as country managers for Spain and Portugal respectively. The acquisition marked Letswork as one of the first Emirati-founded tech startups to establish operations in the European market.

=== Saudi Arabia launch ===
In December 2022, alongside its seed funding round, Letswork announced its expansion into Saudi Arabia. The company received strategic investment from The Space, Saudi Arabia's largest coworking space operator, to facilitate the launch.

=== Work from Park initiative ===
In April 2026, Dubai Municipality announced the "Work from Park" initiative, selecting Letswork to operate co-working spaces within public parks across Dubai. The first location, at Al Barsha Pond Park, is scheduled to open in May 2026, featuring modular workspaces with hot desks, meeting rooms, podcast studios, and creative production facilities. Dubai Municipality signed a Memorandum of Cooperation with Letswork and Group AMANA to develop the infrastructure.

== Funding ==
Letswork has raised a total of approximately US$2.1 million in seed funding. The round, announced in December 2022, included participation from 500 Global, The Space, DTEC Ventures, and other angel investors including Saudi celebrity TV personality Ahmed Al Shugairi. The company had previously raised an undisclosed pre-seed sum from 500 Global, Saudi Arabia-based Sanabil Investments, and other angel investors.

== Business model ==
Letswork operates on a credit-based membership model. Members purchase a subscription plan and receive credits that can be redeemed at any venue within the network. The platform offers several access tiers:

- Coworking Pass – Flexible day passes or monthly memberships to work from any venue without a reservation
- Meeting Rooms – On-demand booking for private rooms for client calls, workshops, and team meetings
- Private Offices – Fully serviced, move-in-ready workspaces for teams
- Creative Studios – Dedicated spaces for podcasting, photography, and video production
- Teams & Enterprise – Tailored packages for companies with centralized billing and admin tools

Unused credits roll over each month. The platform operates on an asset-light model, partnering with existing venues rather than leasing or building dedicated spaces.

== Venue network ==
As of early 2023, Letswork reported over 40,000 members and 300 spaces in the UAE, with additional venues in Portugal, Bahrain, and Spain. The network includes dedicated coworking spaces, boutique cafés, hotel business centres, and creative studios. Major hospitality partners include Hilton, Marriott, Accor, Emaar Hospitality Group, and Rove Hotels.

In November 2025, Emirates NBD announced a collaboration with Letswork to provide its employees access to flexible workspaces across over 100 hubs in Dubai and 25 hubs in Abu Dhabi and the Northern Emirates.

=== Geographic presence ===
Country	Cities
United Arab Emirates	Dubai, Abu Dhabi, Sharjah, Ajman
Saudi Arabia	Riyadh, Jeddah, Dammam, Khobar
Bahrain	Manama
Pakistan	Karachi, Lahore
Spain	Madrid, Málaga
Portugal	Lisbon, Porto

== Partnerships ==
- Dubai Municipality – Memorandum of Cooperation for the "Work from Park" initiative (2026)
- Emirates NBD – Collaboration to offer hybrid work arrangements for bank employees (2025)
- Dubai Chamber of Commerce – Free trial with 25 credits for Chamber members and their employees
- Emaar Properties – Launched through Emaar's E25 entrepreneurship programme
- Dubai Culture – Collaboration to provide creative workspaces for the arts community

== See also ==
- Coworking
- Proptech
- Remote work
