= TurboTenant =

- Type: Private
- Industry: Software; Real estate technology
- Founded: 2015; 11 years ago in Fort Collins, Colorado
- Founders: Sarnen Steinbarth
- Headquarters: Fort Collins, Colorado, United States
- Area served: United States
- Key people: Seamus Nally (CEO)
- Products: TurboTenant platform TurboTenant Autopilot
- Website: turbotenant.com

TurboTenant is an American rental property management software company headquartered in Fort Collins, Colorado.

== History ==
TurboTenant was founded in 2015 by Sarnen Steinbarth, a former real estate agent and landlord, to develop software for independent landlords managing long-term rental properties. The company was originally based at the Galvanize tech campus in Fort Collins.

In 2017, TurboTenant received seed funding from Colorado-based Crescendo Capital Partners with participation from FrontRange Capital Partners. In 2018 and 2019, the company received further investment to expand its operations. In 2020, Seamus Nally, founder of OTL Ventures, merged his company with TurboTenant and joined as chief operating officer.

In December 2021, Steinbarth stepped down as CEO and was succeeded by Nally; that month the company also launched Rent Reporting, a free feature allowing renters to report on-time rent payments to credit bureau TransUnion.

In October 2024, Philadelphia-based private equity firm LLR Partners made an investment in TurboTenant; previous investors remained minority shareholders.

In December 2024, TurboTenant acquired REI Hub, a New Jersey-based provider of accounting software for rental property owners. In May 2025, the company acquired Reno-based Azibo, a financial services platform for rental properties that was founded in 2019.

In June 2025, TurboTenant added screening platform Rent Butter into its application workflow.
