= Godby Shipping =

Finnish shipping firm

Godby Shipping AB
- Trade name: Godby Shipping
- Industry: Shipping
- Founded: 1973
- Founder: Alpo Mikkola
- Headquarters: Mariehamn, Finland
- Key people: Dan Mikkola, Managing Director
- Website: godbyshipping.fi/en

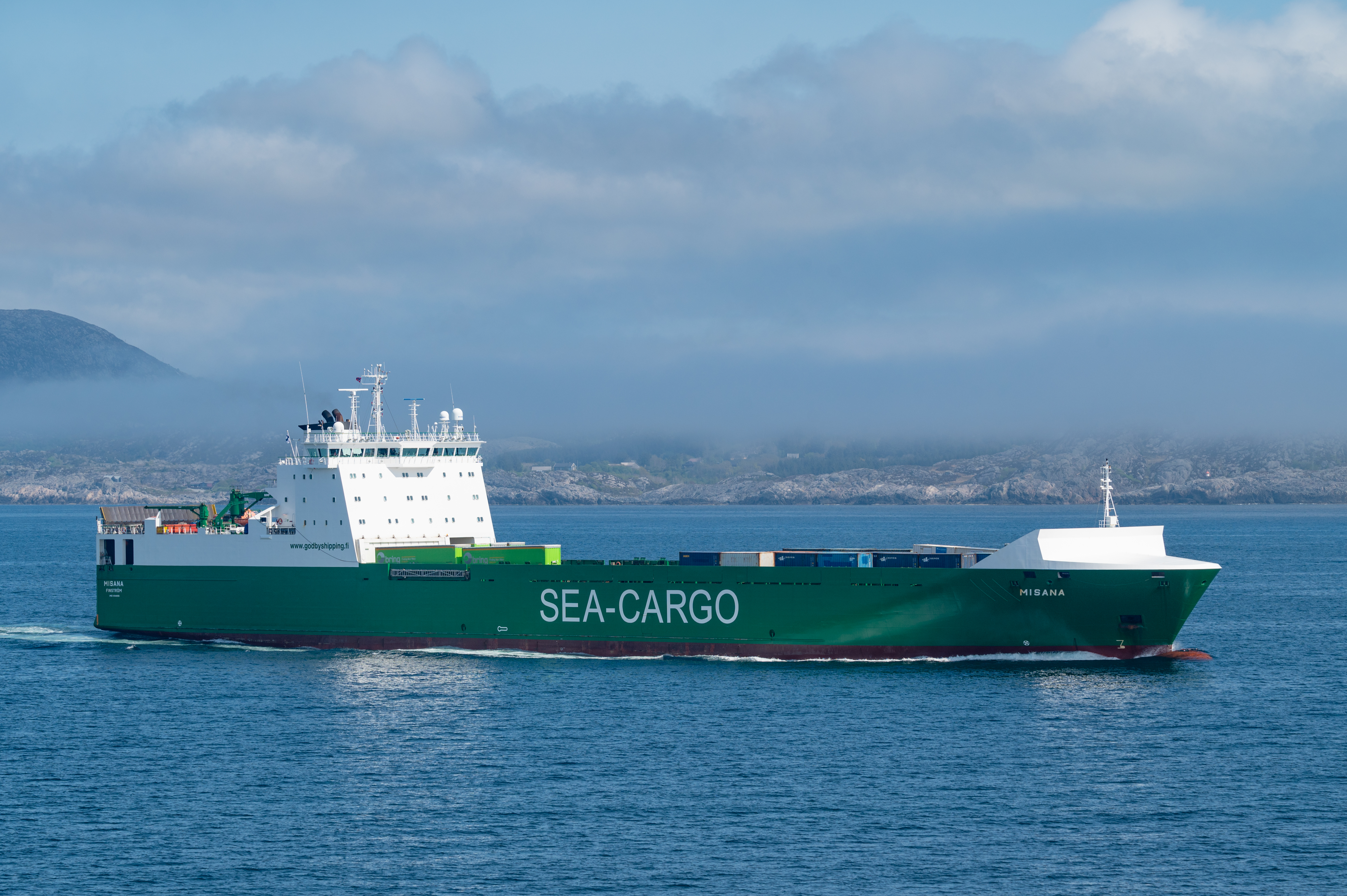
M/S Misana

Godby Shipping AB is a Finnish shipping firm, based in Mariehamn in Åland. It was established in 1973, and as of 2021 its CEO is Dan Mikkola. The company specialises in RO-RO vessels and mainly serves the forestry and pulp & paper sector, as well as liner operators through tailor-made sea transportation services.

As of 2026, Godby Shipping operates eight RO-RO vessels under the Finnish and Norwegian flags and employs approximately 200 people, including 10 shore-based office staff.

The company purchased the RO-RO vessel Transporter from Eckerö Shipping in November 2025 and announced in February 2026 that it had ordered two Stream Roro 1700 vessels from CIMC Raffles in China, with options for two additional vessels.

== History ==
=== Founding ===
The company was founded by Captain Alpo Mikkola in 1973. Alpo Mikkola, Bror Husell, Kaino Virta and Matti Kankare bought the salvaged cargo vessel Heike Bos for SEK 175,000 on 15 September 1972. The ship was repaired in Mariehamn and Turku. The ship reentered service in winter 1973 after being renamed Miniland. The original partners other than Mikkola left and were replaced by new investors Torsten Törnroth, Sigvard Åkerberg and Ingmar Törnroth.

Soon after the vessels Luna and Mini Star were bought, operated briefly and onsold. The company initially operated in short-term charters and then began to specialize in longer-term charters to companies associated with the Forestry Industry and Pulp & Paper.

== Fleet ==
Godby Shipping Fleet (February 2023)
Name	Build Year	Deadweight Tonnage	IMO Number	Port of Registry and Flag	Notes
MV Lysbris Seaways	1999	7,500	9144263	Oslo, Norway	Acquired by Godby Shipping in January 2022. Chartered to DFDS Seaways who subcharters the ship to Norsk Skog, bringing paper and forestry products from Skogn, Norway to the Netherlands and the United Kingdom.
MV Lysvik Seaways	1998	7,500	9144251	Oslo, Norway	Acquired by Godby Shipping in December 2021. Chartered to DFDS Seaways who subcharters the ship to Norsk Skog, bringing paper and forestry products from Skogn, Norway to the Netherlands and the United Kingdom.
MV Baltic Bright	1996	6,302	9129263	Mariehamn, Finland	Bought by Godby Shipping in January 2021. Chartered to Holmen and used between Sweden and the UK.
MV Midas	1990	4,491	9002659	Brändö, Finland	Chartered to Stena and sails between Travemunde, Germany and Liepaja, Latvia. Previously charered by Condor Ferries on the Portsmouth to Guernsey route.
MV Mimer	1990	4,491	9002647	Brändö, Finland	Built by Sietas Schiffswerft, Hamburg, Germany. Formerly named 'BORE STAR'. Chartered to CMA CGM and sails between Philipsburg, Christiansted, Gustavia, Basseterre and Point A Pitre.
MS Mistral	1999	7,438	9183788	Brändö, Finland	Built by Sietas Schiffswerft, Hamburg, Germany. Leased to Smyril Line for their Hirtshals-Faroe Islands-Iceland route.
MV Aurora	1991	6,600			Acquired in 2024 from a Chile.
MV Transporter	1991	5,387			Acquired in 2025 from Eckerö Shipping.

== Former Fleet ==
Name	Build Year	Deadweight Tonnage	IMO Number	Flag	Notes
MS ANNELI	1934	493	5047479	Finström, Finland	Built by Rotterdamsche Droogdok Maatschappij. Operated by Godby Shipping from 1973 to 1975. Scrapped in Helsinki in 1982.
MS Baltica	1990	13,772	8813154	Mariehamn, Finland	Built by Hyundai Shipbuilding & Heavy Industries Co Ltd, Ulsan, South Korea. Former name 'AHLERS BALTIC'. Operated by Godby Shipping between 2015 and 2021. Now named 'VASSILIOS' and is owned by Salamis Lines, Cyprus.
MS HEBE	1962	2,228	5145025	Panama	Built by Wärtsilä-Koncernen Ab, Turku, Finland. Operated by Godby Shipping between 1987 and 1990.
MS JULIA	1993	5,313	9001485	Finström, Finland	Built by Stocznia Marynark Wojennej, Gdynia, Poland. Owned and operated by Godby Shipping until 1998.
MS LINK STAR	1989	4,453	8805602	Finström, Finland	Built by Sietas Schiffswerft, Hamburg, Germany. Small container-ship. Operated by Godby Shipping until 2021.
Miniland	1966	1,330	6616851		Godby Shipping's first ship and was operated by the company from its founding in 1973 to 1985. Built as Heike Bos by Jansen Schiffswerft, Leer, Germany . Scrapped in Turkey in 2010.
Miranda	1999	7,440	9183790	Finström, Finland	Built by Sietas Schiffswerft, Hamburg, Germany. Operated by Godby Shipping until 2018. Now named Miramar Express.
MV Misana	2007	11,704	9348936	Mariehamn, Finland	Chartered, and later sold to Sea-Cargo.
MV Misida	2007	11,704	9348948	Brändö, Finland	Chartered, and later sold to Sea-Cargo.

== Gallery ==
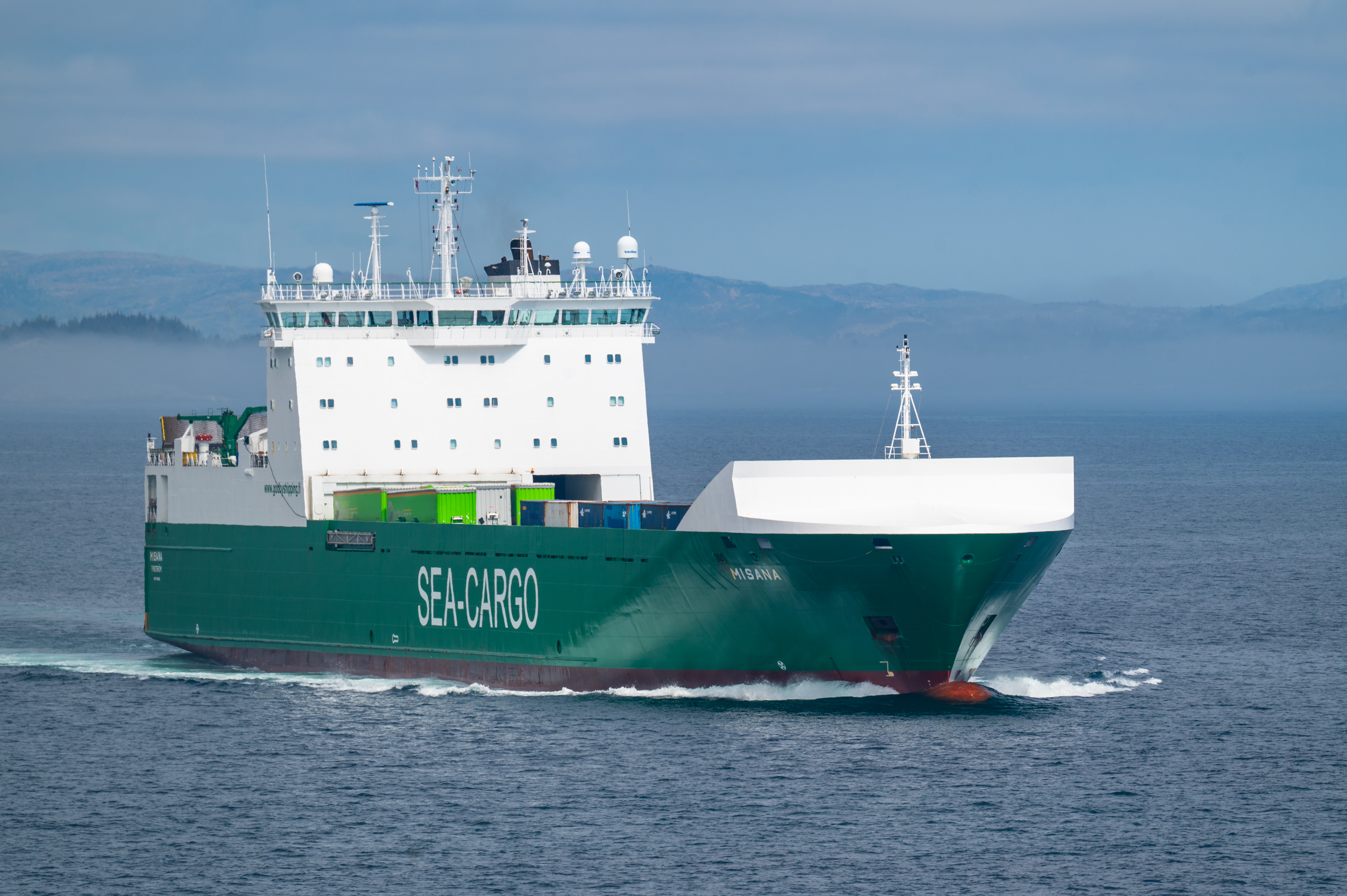
MV Misana, under charter with Sea-Cargo, in fjords of Norway

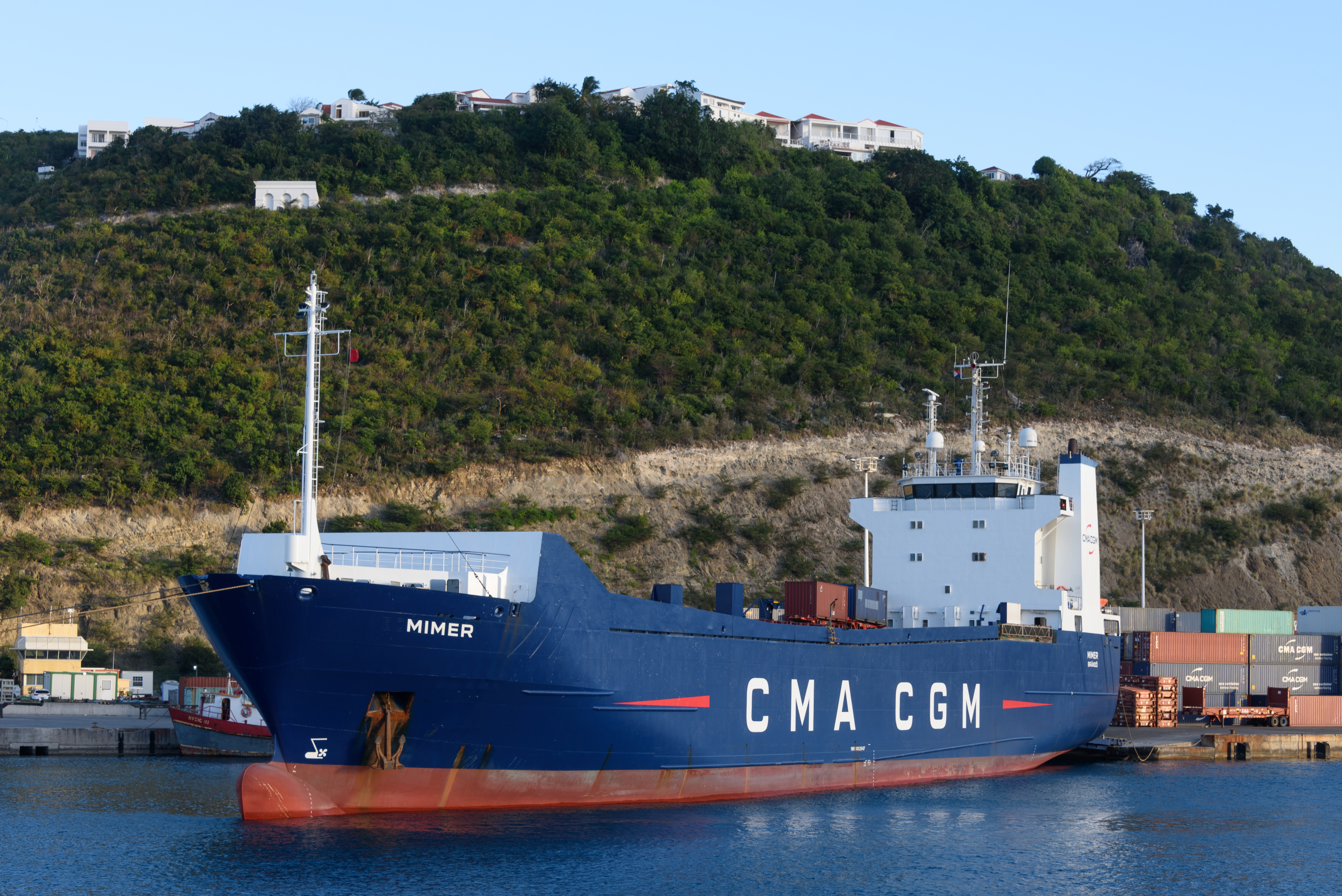
MV Mimer, seen in her CMA CGM livery at Philipsburg, Sint Maarten

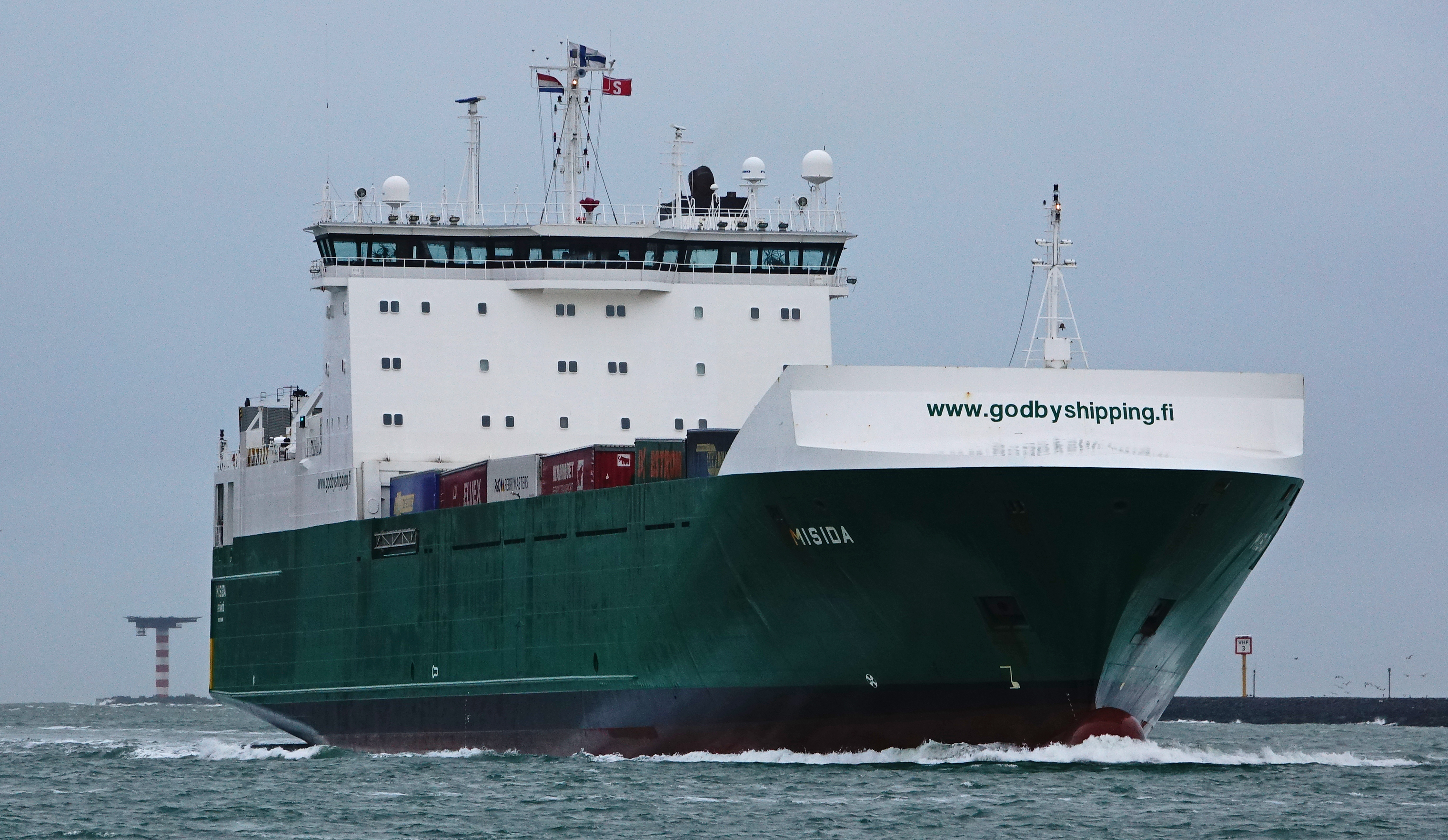
MV Misida arriving at Rotterdam, Netherlands

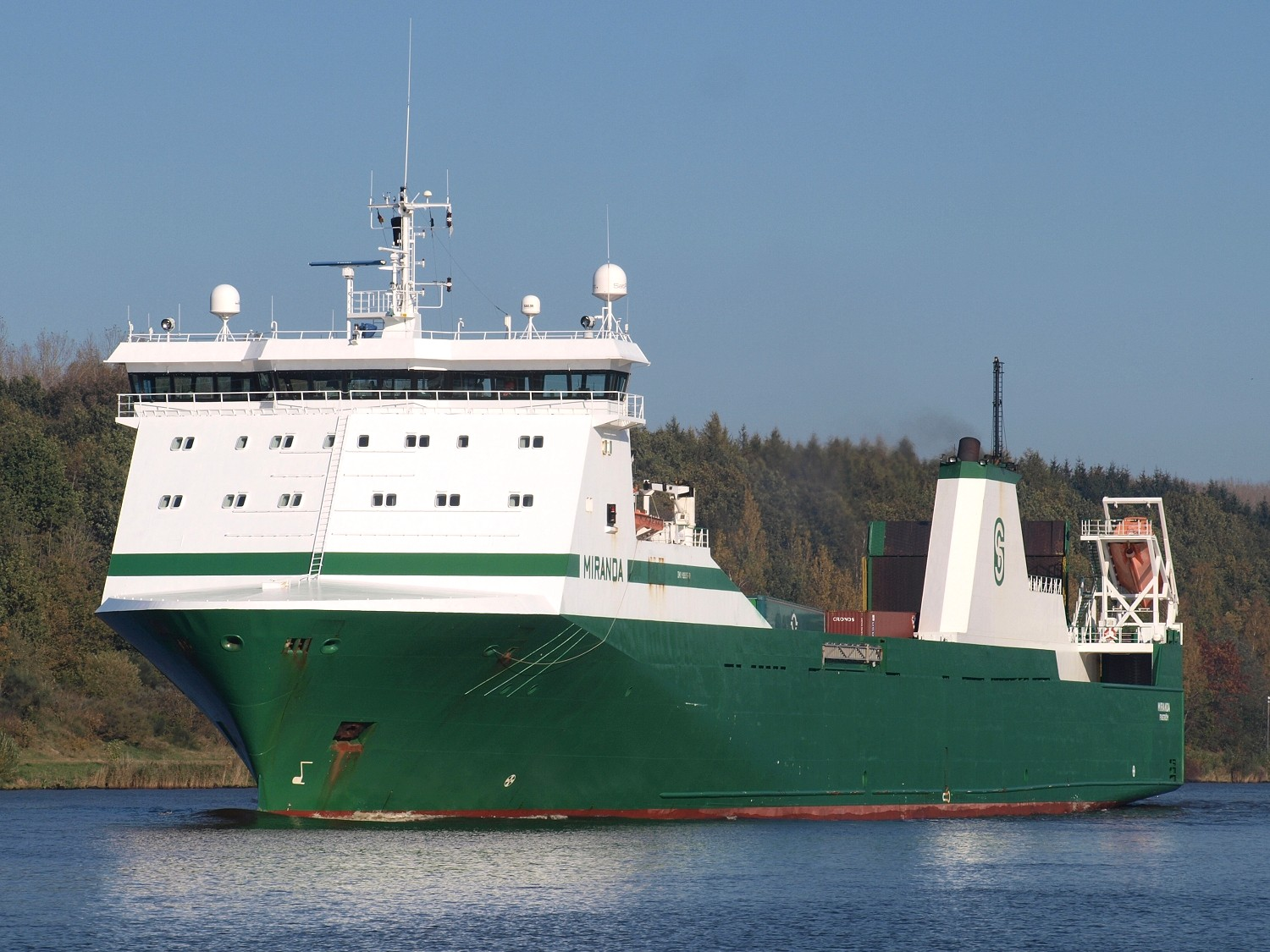
Former Godby Shipping Ro-Ro vessel, MV Miranda, transiting the Kiel Canal
