= Minibus =

12-to-30-seat passenger-carrying motor vehicle

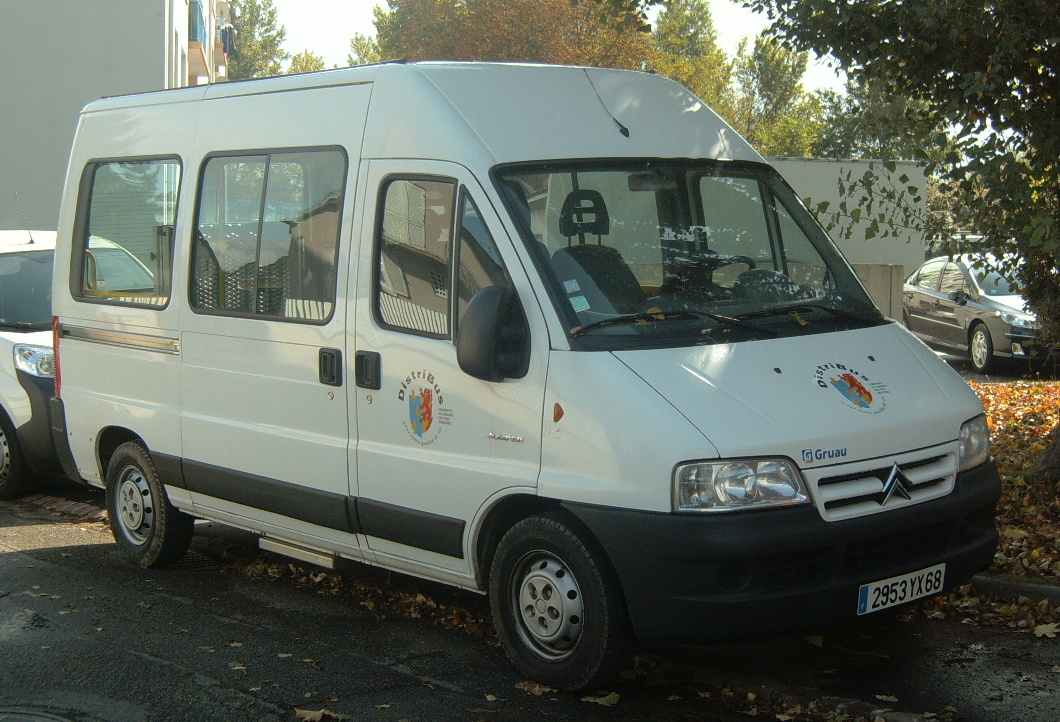
Citroën Jumper minibus in France

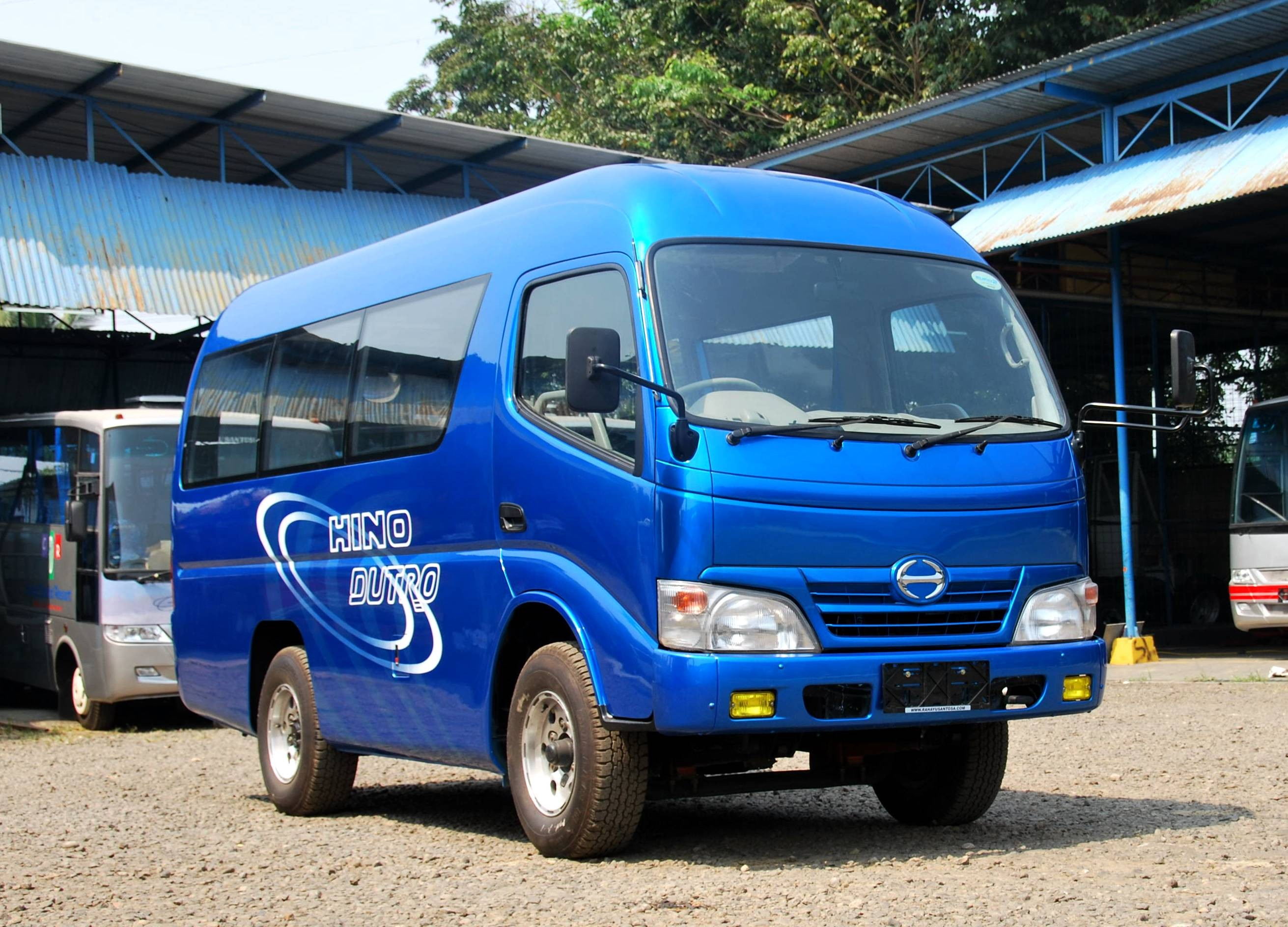
Hino Dutro 110SD 12-seater microbus in Indonesia

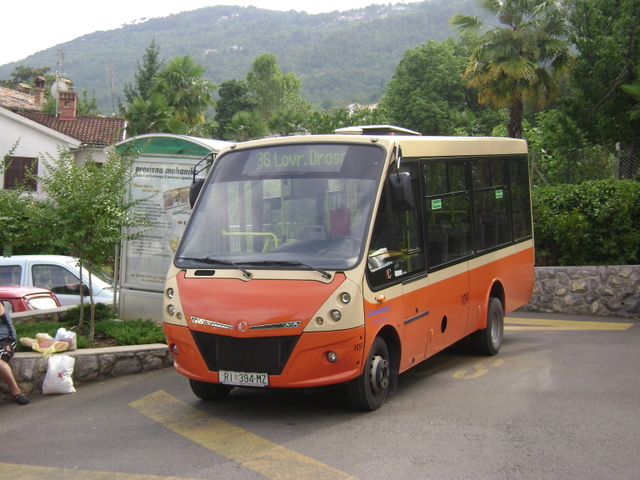
Cacciamali Urby (built on Iveco Daily chassis) in Rijeka, Croatia

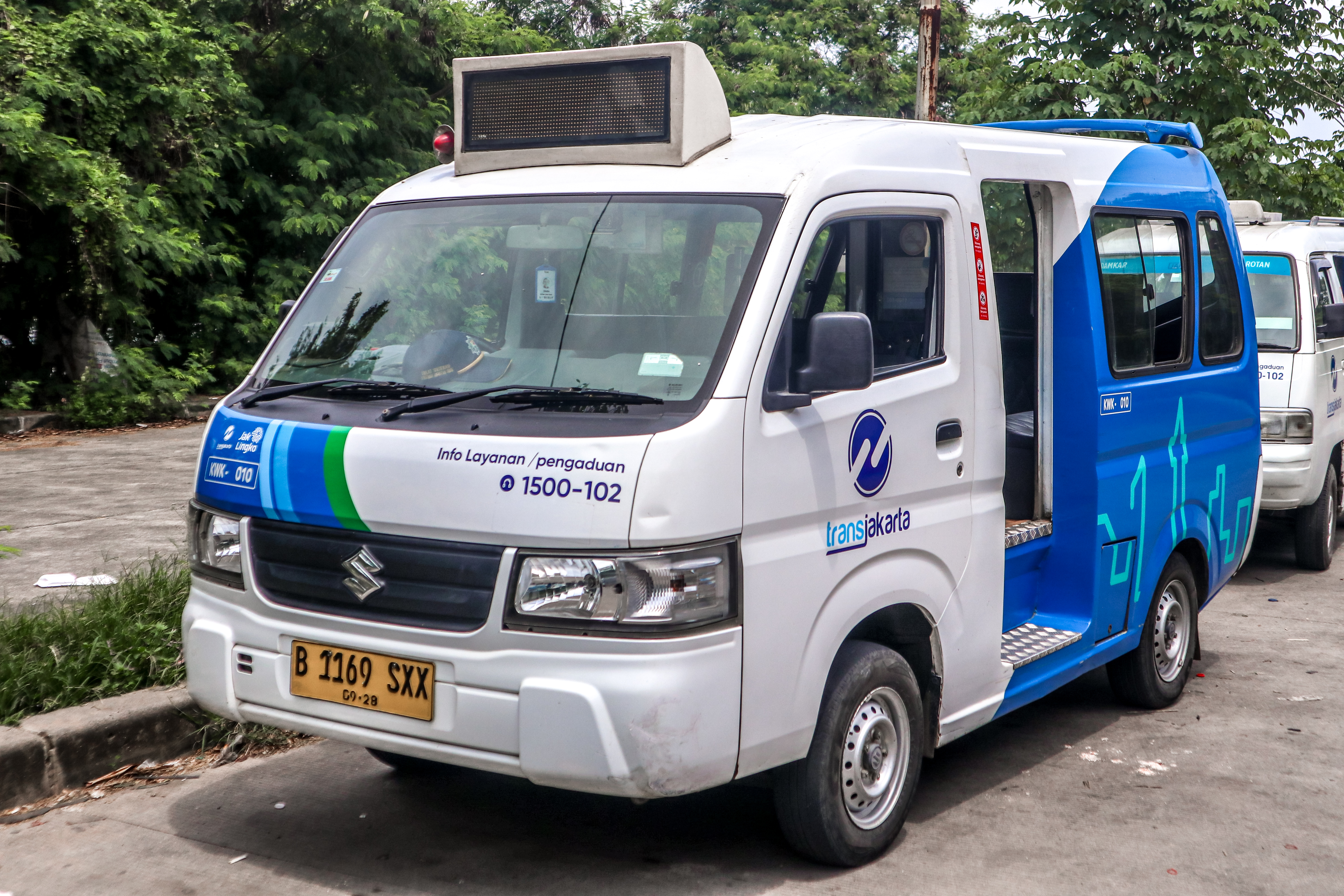
Minibus vehicle from Suzuki Carry used as public transportation of Transjakarta in Indonesia

A minibus, microbus, minicoach, or short bus is a passenger-carrying motor vehicle that is designed to carry more people than a multi-purpose vehicle or minivan, but fewer people than a full-size bus. In the United Kingdom, the word "minibus" is used to describe any full-sized passenger-carrying van or panel truck. Minibuses have a seating capacity of between 12 and 30. Larger minibuses may be called midibuses. Minibuses are usually front-engine vehicles with step-in access, though low-floor designs are especially common in Japan.

== History ==
It is unknown when the first minibus vehicle was developed. For example, Ford Model T vehicles were modified for passenger transport by early bus companies and entrepreneurs. Ford produced a version during the 1920s to carry up to twelve people.

In the Soviet Union, the production of minibuses began in the mid-1950s, among the first mass-produced minibuses were the RAF-10, UAZ-451B, and Start. Since September 1961, the RAF-977D "Latvia" minibus began to be mass-produced.

== Regional variants ==
There are many different form of public transportation services around the world that are provided by using vehicles that can be considered as minibus:

- Angkot in Indonesia.
- Bas Mini in Malaysia.
- Colectivo in Argentina.
- Chiva bus in Colombia and Ecuador in southern South America.
- Dala dala in Tanzania
- Dollar van a.k.a. jitneys, in the United States.
- Dolmuş in Turkey
- Modern Jeepney in the Philippines
- Marshrutka in eastern Europe.
- Matatu around Kenya
- Minibus taxi in South Africa, Ethiopia, see also Taxi wars in South Africa
- Pesero, minibuses operating as regular buses in Mexico, especially in Mexico City.
- Public light buses, in Hong Kong.
- Sherut in Israel
- Songthaew around Thailand and Lao
- Tap tap in Haiti
- Tro tro around Ghana
- Weyala in Ethiopia
- Maxi-taxi in Trinidad and Romania

== Driving licence ==
Some countries may require an additional class of driving licence over a normal private car licence, and some may require a full commercial driving licence. The need for such a licence may depend on:

- Vehicle weight or size
- Seating capacity
- Driver age
- Intended usage
- Additional training (such as the Minibus Driver Awareness Scheme in the UK)

=== France ===
In France, if the vehicle has more than 9 seats, a D permit is required. If there are between 9 and 17 seats, the driver must have a D1 permit.

=== United Kingdom ===
In the UK, the holder of an ordinary car driving licence which was obtained prior to January 1997, once aged 21 years minimum, may drive a Minibus with a capacity of 16 passengers. Where the "ordinary car driving licence" is obtained after December 1996, they will have to take a separate test to drive a vehicle with a capacity of more than 8 passengers. However, there is an exemption for certain volunteer drivers, where the vehicle does not exceed 3500 kg GVW (or 4250 kg GVW if the vehicle is designed to be wheelchair accessible).

=== United States ===
In the United States, if the vehicle has 15 or fewer passengers, no special license is required. If there are 16 or more passengers (including the driver), a commercial driver's license is required (the specific type varies by state).

=== Ontario, Canada ===
A driving licence issued in Ontario, Canada, for an equivalent of a UK class B or class B-auto driving licence (in the case of Ontario, a class G licence), allows its holder to drive vehicles with:

- 11 tonnes maximum authorized mass, including trailers with 4.6 tonnes MAM 6 tonnes MAM in certain cases)
- passenger seating capacity of 9 or less

Anyone wanting to drive a vehicle in Ontario, with the same MAM limits as for class G vehicles, with fewer than 25, but at least 10, passenger seats, must obtain a short bus licence (Class F in Ontario). This will allow, for example, its holder to drive 12- and 15-passenger vans] that Transport Canada defines as large passenger vans. A separate class of driving license (Class C) is required for full-size school buses and school buses.

== See also ==
- Cutaway van chassis
- Volkswagen Transporter
- Share taxi
