= Non-executive director =

Corporate title

A non-executive director (abbreviated to non-exec, NED or NXD), independent director or external director is a member of the board of directors of a corporation, such as a company, cooperative or non-government organization, but not a member of the executive management team. They are not employees of the corporation or affiliated with it in any other way and are differentiated from executive directors, who are members of the board who also serve, or previously served, as executive managers of the corporation (most often as corporate officers). However, they do have the same legal duties, responsibilities and potential liabilities as their executive counterparts.

Non-executive directors provide independent oversight and serve on committees concerned with sensitive issues such as the pay of the executive directors and other senior managers; they are usually paid a fee for their services but are not regarded as employees.

All directors should be capable of seeing corporate and business issues in a broad perspective. Nonetheless, non-executive directors are usually chosen because of their independence and initiative, are of an appropriate caliber and have particular personal qualities.

== Role ==
Fundamentally, the non-executive director role is to provide a creative contribution and improvement to the board by providing dispassionate and objective criticism. Their role may change depending on the organisation, though they are usually not involved in the day-to-day management of the corporation but monitor the executive activity and contribute to the development strategy.

Non-executive directors can also be referred to as external directors; they are usually people of stature and experience who can act as both a source of wise independent advice and a check on any wilder elements on a board.

According to the UK Institute of Directors, non-executive directors are expected to focus on board matters and not stray into ‘executive direction,’ thus providing an independent view of the corporation that is removed from day-to-day running. Non-executive directors, then, are appointed to bring to the board:

- Independence;
- Impartiality;
- Wide experience;
- Special knowledge;
- Personal qualities.

In addition to the above five key qualities an effective non-executive director would influence the achievement of balance of the board of directors as a whole as well as commitment, perception and a broad perspective of the area or industry. More key responsibilities may include:

- Contributing to the strategic direction of the corporation;
- Efficiently solving problems that arise;
- Communicating with third parties;
- Ensuring all the audit requirements are satisfied;
- Remuneration of the executive directors;
- Appointing the board of directors.

== Key responsibilities ==
Non-executive directors have responsibilities in the following areas, according to the Review of the role and effectiveness of non-executive directors (the Higgs report), published by the British government in 2003:

- Strategy: Non-executive directors should constructively challenge and contribute to the development of strategy. As an external member of an organisation, the NED may have a clearer or wider view of possible factors affecting the corporation and its business environment, more-so than executive directors.
- Performance: Non-executive directors should scrutinise the performance of management in meeting-agreed goals and objectives and monitoring and, where necessary, removing senior management, and in succession planning.
- Risk: Non-executive directors should satisfy themselves that financial information is accurate and that financial controls and systems of risk management are robust and defensible.
- People: Non-executive directors can benefit the corporation's and board's effectiveness through outside contacts and opinions. Helping the business and board connect with networks of useful people and organisations become an important function for the NED to fulfill.

NEDs should also provide independent views on:

- Resources
- Appointments
- Standards of conduct

Boards (and the non-executive directors on them) also have a responsibility to evaluate their own performance. Reasons for undertaking a board evaluation might include:

- to address specific issues
- to benchmark performance against other companies
- the need to ensure that the board is doing the best it can
- the need to be seen to be doing something

Much has been written about how best to go about evaluating board performance and it remains a key topic of discussion.

== Negative and positive contributions ==
The Institute of Directors in New Zealand outlines ten clear benefits that independent directors can bring to a start-up and high growth business. These are

- They bring an objective viewpoint to the board
- They are unlikely to have any family or majority ownership ties to the business
- They can cast a critical eye over the business without preconception or prejudice
- They are also able to act in the capacity of counselor, sounding board and devil's advocate
- They bring a one-off business knowledge and experience in many areas
- Many start-ups and high growth businesses tend to operate in a vacuum without looking at outside forces
- Outside directors introduce a fresh, and usually innovative, perspective
- They may compensate in some of the key areas where management may be weak
- The outside director may act a bit like a consultant
- They bring input and the ability to assist with objectivity

Having a non-executive director in a business may seem necessary due to the benefits having one can provide; however, it is possible a NED may contribute to a dynamic of deteriorating board relationships. Executives could come to resent or be frustrated by non-executive contributions that they perceive to be either ill-informed or inappropriate. This in turn can contribute to a dynamic of deteriorating board relationships, characterized by withholding of information and mistrust. As one executive described it:

"When a non-executive director displays insight and real knowledge and undertakes a role in a very serious fashion, asks brave questions, takes an interest in issues the directors know that they are going to be kept on their toes in relation to these issues, and the respect level rises. Then that person becomes an approachable person … it is actually cumulative in terms of the benefits that can come from that … it can go completely the other way because it is just, 'well, they don't know anything about the business, they had to ask the obligatory three questions' and then the respect gets lost between the parties and you do not have a relationship that is built. It gets back down to what is the ability of the person and what is driving them to become engaged … When that engagement actually adds value and can be seen to add value, then very quickly you get a dynamic where you improve the situation."

== Audit ==
It is the duty of the whole board to ensure that a company's accounts are prepared properly. These should inform its shareholders by presenting a true and fair reflection of its actions and financial performance and all of the board should ensure that the necessary internal control systems are put into place and monitored regularly and rigorously. A non-executive director has an important part to play in fulfilling this responsibility whether or not a formal audit committee (composed of non-executive directors) of the board has been constituted.

== Remuneration ==
According to NEDonBoard, non-executive directors typically sit on the main board and have responsibility on the board sub-committees (e.g. audit committee, risk committee, nomination committee, remuneration committee). Research points to an average remuneration of £60 to 80k for FTSE 100 NEDs and £50 to 60k for FTSE 250 NEDs. SMEs remunerate their non-executive directors at lower rates, in the £20-30k range. Most roles in the not-for-profit sector are voluntary roles. There are a few factors that determine the level of remuneration of a NED:

- Size
- Sector
- Enterprise type
- Maturity
- Financial resources
- Time commitment
- Responsibilities including being a member of a sub-committee of the board, being the SID, the chair of the board or a sub-committee

== Training and education ==
It is important that all non-executive directors are aware of their duties and liabilities as well as developing the softer skills associated with the role such as board behaviour and effective challenge. There are a number of organisations who provide this type of training such as NEDonBoard, the Institute of Directors and Financial Times.

== Types of organisation ==
A non-executive director can be appointed in different organisations:

- The private sector
- The public sector
- Academic sector
- Third sector

Duties depend on whether they represent the interest of shareholders, in the private sector, or the interest of the society in public organisation.

== Appraisal objectives ==
Some organisations appraise non-executive directors on general overall performance criteria such as in the Higgs Report, whereas others in addition set specific individual objectives, which may be specifically linked to the overall organisation goals.

== See also ==
- Agency cost
- Chairperson
- Corporate title
- Independent director
- ITNEA
- Managing director
