= Qstay =

Hospitality and property technology company

Qstay Hospitality Technologies Ltd.
- Company type: Private
- Industry: Hospitality, Property technology
- Founded: 2020
- Founders: Artur Khayrullin; Ekaterina Rogozhina; Alec Redelman Fesenko; Natalya Fesenko
- Headquarters: Dubai, United Arab Emirates
- Area served: Global
- Key people: Artur Khayrullin (CEO); Alec Redelman Fesenko (Co-founder)
- Products: Short-term rental management, virtual hotel services
- Number of employees: 51–200
- Website: stayqstay.com

Qstay is a hospitality and property technology company headquartered in Dubai, United Arab Emirates. Founded in 2020, the company operates as a virtual hotel brand, managing a portfolio of short-term rental properties that it equips with standardized hotel-like services and amenities.

Qstay's business model focuses on leasing, managing, and upgrading high-end apartments, villas, and penthouses in prime locations, then making them available for rent on various booking platforms. The company has also integrated blockchain technology into its platform, launching a native cryptocurrency token to facilitate payments and develop a decentralized hospitality ecosystem.

== History ==
Qstay was founded in 2020 by Artur Khayrullin, Ekaterina Rogozhina, Alec Redelman Fesenko, and Natalya Fesenko, aiming to utilize technology to enhance the management and guest experience of short-term rentals.

In July 2022, Qstay announced the closing of a US$6.5 million seed funding round, which included a mix of debt and equity financing. In June 2024, the company secured an additional $4.6 million in a pre-Series A funding round, bringing its total raised capital to $11.1 million. These funds were designated for further expansion and technology development.

Initially focused on the Dubai market, as of 2025 the company expanded its portfolio to include properties in other cities such as Ras Al Khaimah, Tbilisi, Baku and Abu Dhabi.

== Operations and business model ==
Qstay operates as a "virtual hotel brand" by leasing properties, upgrading them to a consistent luxury standard, and managing them with a suite of tech-enabled services. The company focuses on high-end accommodations in prime locations, such as Dubai Marina, Palm Jumeirah, and Downtown Dubai. Guest services, including extra cleaning and late checkouts, are managed through a mobile app. The properties are equipped with standardized amenities like designer bathrobes and luxury linens, and often provide access to 5-star building facilities like pools and gyms.

The company has received accolades for its service quality, including Airbnb Superhost status with an average property rating above 4.80 stars. A key part of its growth strategy involves partnerships, such as a major agreement in 2025 to manage the 367-unit Carlton Hotel & Suites in Dubai. As of August 2025, Qstay reported it had managed over 300 properties and achieved $18 million in cumulative revenue since its inception, and planned a strategic shift from a property management company to a global hospitality platform, leveraging its technology for broader applications.

== Blockchain integration ==
In August 2025, Qstay announced the integration of blockchain technology into its platform with the launch of its native cryptocurrency token (ticker:QSTAY), on the Solana blockchain. The token is positioned as a Real-World Asset (RWA), with its value linked to the company's portfolio of over 300 hospitality units. The primary utility of the token is to facilitate crypto-friendly payments for bookings on the Qstay platform and app. This initiative is part of the company's strategy to develop a decentralized hospitality marketplace and expand its global partnerships through the use of smart contracts.

== See also ==
- Hospitality industry
- Real-World Assets
