= Holo (company) =

Emirati financial technology company

- Type: Private
- Industry: Financial technology; Property technology
- Founded: 2019; 7 years ago
- Founders: Michael Hunter; Arran Summerhill
- Headquarters: Dubai, United Arab Emirates
- Area served: Gulf Cooperation Council
- Key people: Michael Hunter (CEO); Arran Summerhill (COO)
- Website: www.useholo.com

Holo is a financial technology (fintech) and property technology (proptech) company based in Dubai, United Arab Emirates. The company operates a digital platform that provides mortgage and property-buying services in the United Arab Emirates and Saudi Arabia.

== History ==
Holo was founded in Dubai in 2019 by Michael Hunter and Arran Summerhill. The company launched its platform in 2020.

Before establishing Holo, Hunter and Summerhill had worked in traditional mortgage brokerage in the United Kingdom and the UAE. They developed the company after identifying inefficiencies in the traditional mortgage and home-buying process.

During the COVID-19 pandemic, the platform saw increased use of digital mortgage services. Arabian Business reported in 2020 that applications through Holo had increased by 300 percent over a two-month period.

By 2021, Holo allowed applicants to receive mortgage quotations, upload supporting documents, submit applications online and track their progress through an online dashboard.

In 2023, Holo raised a seed funding round led by Watheeq Proptech Venture and Hambro Perks Oryx Fund.

In May 2024, the company announced a pre-Series A funding round led by Dubai Future District Fund and Oryx Fund.

In 2024, Holo also began expanding into Saudi Arabia. Michael Hunter described the country as the company's next regional market, while the founders discussed the expansion of digital mortgage and property technology services across the Gulf.

In August 2025, Holo raised US$22 million in a Series A funding round led by Impact46.

== Operations ==
Holo operates a digital platform for property buyers in the United Arab Emirates and Saudi Arabia. The company's services include mortgage brokerage, mortgage comparison, refinancing, conveyancing, and support for buying property. The platform allows users to compare mortgage products, submit applications and supporting documents digitally, and track the progress of their applications online.

Holo also operates Hub, a platform for real estate agents. It connects agents with people who want to buy property and supports the property-buying process. The platform includes tools for mortgage referrals, buyer matching, and referral tracking.
