= Migraine Disability Assessment Test =

The Migraine Disability Assessment Test (MIDAS) is a test used by doctors to determine how severely migraines affect a patient's life. Patients are asked questions about the frequency and duration of their headaches, as well as how often these headaches limited their ability to participate in activities at work, at school, or at home.

The test was evaluated by the professional journal Neurology in 2001; it was found to be both reliable and valid.

== Questions ==
The MIDAS contains the following questions:

1. On how many days in the last 3 months did you miss work or school because of your headaches?
2. How many days in the last 3 months was your productivity at work or school reduced by half or more because of your headaches? (Do not include days you counted in question 1 where you missed work or school.)
3. On how many days in the last 3 months did you not do household work because of your headaches?
4. How many days in the last three months was your productivity in household work reduced by half of more because of your headaches? (Do not include days you counted in question 3 where you did not do household work.)
5. On how many days in the last 3 months did you miss family, social or leisure activities because of your headaches?

The patient's score consists of the total of these five questions. Additionally, there is a section for patients to share with their doctors:

What your Physician will need to know about your headache:

A. On how many days in the last 3 months did you have a headache? (If a headache lasted more than 1 day, count each day.)

B. On a scale of 0 - 10, on average how painful were these headaches? (where 0 = no pain at all and 10 = pain as bad as it can be.)

== Scoring ==
Once scored, the test gives the patient an idea of how debilitating his/her migraines are based on this scale:

0 to 5, MIDAS Grade I, Little or no disability

6 to 10, MIDAS Grade II, Mild disability

11 to 20, MIDAS Grade III, Moderate disability

21+, MIDAS Grade IV, Severe disability
