= Midas (English band) =

- Origin: Stourbridge, England
- Genre: Indie rock
- Years active: 2003 – March 2009
- Label: Unsigned
- Past members: Kris Lloyd; Lee Scott; Jake Mason; Rich Lloyd; Dave Mason
- Website: Midas Official

Midas was an English indie band based in Stourbridge and Birmingham, England. It was formed in 2003.

== Line-up ==
The band consisted of Kris Lloyd (vocals/guitar), Rich Lloyd (synth/vocoder), Jake Mason (bass guitar/vocals), Dave Mason (drums) and Lee Scott (guitar). Mason joined the band after Dave Smyth's departure due to study commitments in October 2007. Smyth himself joined the band in November 2006.

== Live ==
Most of their gigs are played at venues in the West Midlands, although in 2007 several gigs were played at clubs in London and in north-west towns and cities such as Liverpool, Manchester and Blackpool. The band played abroad for the first time in Italy during late 2007, playing a number of dates at a festival in Venice.

== "Don't Dance" ==
Midas' first single, "Don't Dance", was released on 19 March 2007. It sold 2,007 copies, reaching number 59 in the UK Singles Chart, number three in the UK Indie Chart and number 25 in the Official UK Physical Sales Chart. Additionally, the band reached number one in music store Fopp's sales chart, which led to an in-store performance being arranged at their flagship Tottenham Court Road store in London on 29 March 2007. The song was produced by Gavin Monaghan, also known for his work with Editors, Scott Matthews and The Twang.

== "Red Shoes" ==
"Red Shoes" is the second single by Midas, released on 20 August 2007 on the band's own record label, Plastic Tank, which is distributed by Cargo. It was recorded at Outhouse Studios in Reading with John Mitchell (Enter Shikari) and engineered by Ben Humphreys.

The single was disqualified from the UK Singles Chart. A message was posted on the band's Myspace page saying, "We were informed at 12:51 yesterday by the Official UK Chart Company (OCC) that they will not be including 'Red Shoes' in the singles chart this Sunday. We were shocked to receive this news, as neither the OCC nor our retail partners (7digital and Tunetribe) had previously made us aware of any issues with the sales of this single, and the single had registered on the midweek charts at number 16 on Tuesday. The OCC stated they believed some of the sales of this single were not eligible for the chart, and consequently had exercised their discretional right to discount all sales from the chart this week. The OCC have as yet refused to disclose any evidence to support their claims, and have not given us sufficient time to properly appeal against their decision. We are therefore sad to announce that it seems that we have to accept that the sales of our single will now not be used for the purposes of the chart. We apologise to all our fans who have supported us in good faith and purchased our music. You have done nothing wrong. We are bitterly disappointed that we have not been given the time to prove this to the OCC."

== Publicity and critical reaction ==
The band has been particularly supported by Kerrang! Radio. Loz Guest (specialist shows producer) played Midas' earlier material on the Unsigned show before the release of "Don't Dance". The breakfast DJ, Ugly Phil, had the band on his show for features, including the "Wrong Songs Grand Final" and "Challenge Rachel". Other DJs to champion the band on air include Sean Coleman and Jim Coulson. The band has also appeared on Tim Shaw's Asylum.

On 12 February 2007, the band appeared on the Janice Long show on BBC Radio 2, performing a live acoustic set of three songs. Long placed "Don't Dance" on her playlist.

Their second single, "Red Shoes", achieved even greater exposure, with support and airplay from XFM London's Steve Harris and Ian Camfield.

Paul Kramer, publisher of Hit Sheet magazine, featured "Don't Dance" in issue No. 95.

== Band split ==
On 11 March 2009, the band posted a blog on its MySpace page to say that they were each going into different directions, and were no more. Speculation on the band's problems in gaining support from major and independent labels has been discussed on internet forums. The decision was taken after the then touring line-up decided not to continue with touring and to concentrate on other ventures.

== Singles ==
Year	Song	UK Singles Chart	UK Indie Chart	UK Physical Sales
2007	"Don't Dance"	59	3	25
