= D+H =

Canadian financial services company

- Type: Subsidiary
- Industry: Financial services
- Founded: 1875 (as Davis & Henderson)
- Defunct: 2017
- Fate: Bought by Vista Equity Partners and merged with Misys
- Successor: Finastra
- Headquarters: Toronto, Ontario, Canada
- Key people: Gerrard Schmid (Chief Executive Officer); Karen Weaver (Chief Financial Officer); William Neville (Chief Operating Officer)
- Products: Banking technology, payment technology, lending technology, core banking technology
- Revenue: ▲US$1,507 million (2015)
- Operating income: ▲US$424.7 million (2015)
- Net income: ▼US$84.0 million (2015)
- Number of employees: 5,500
- Parent: Vista Equity Partners
- Website: www.dh.com

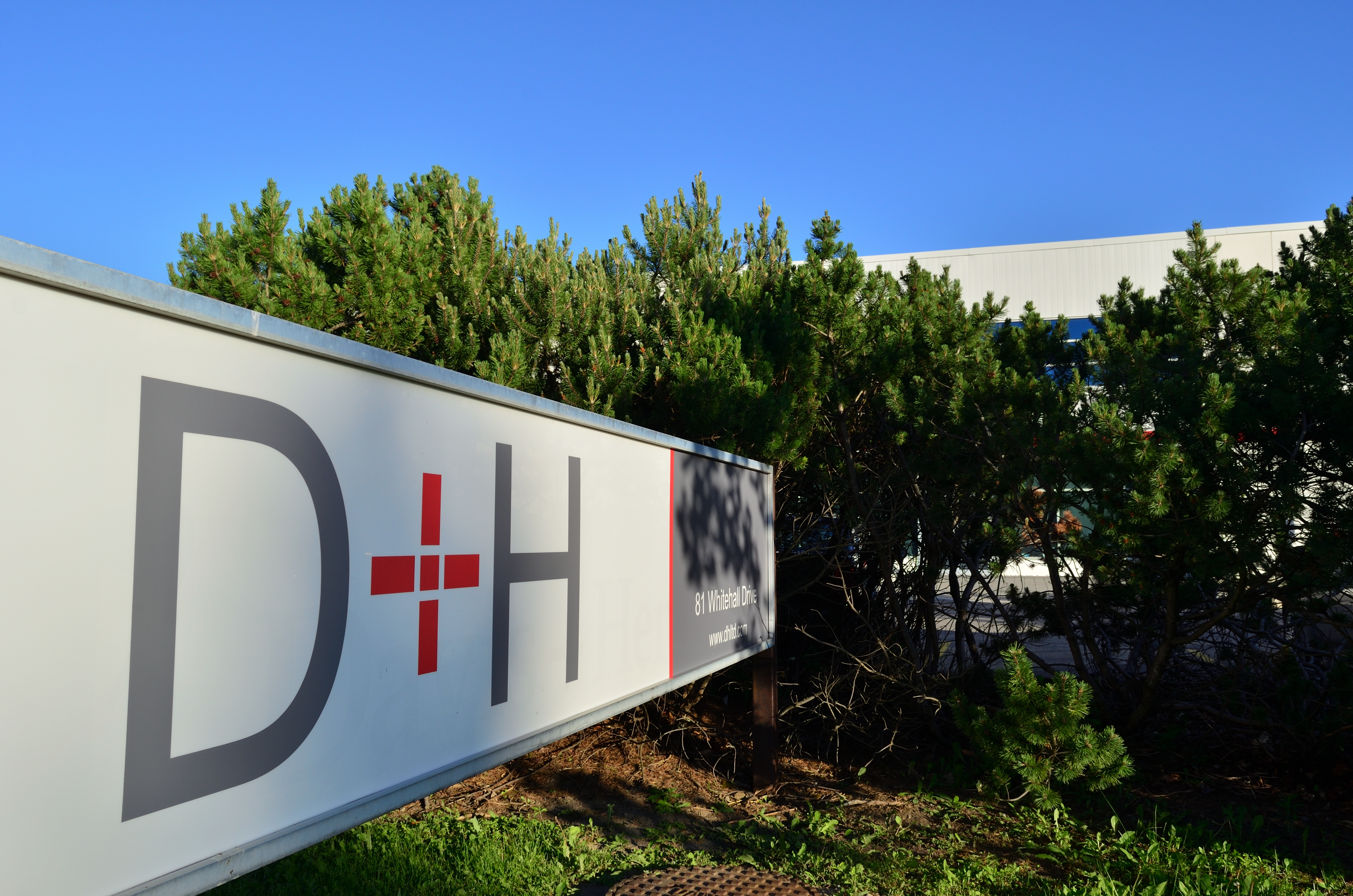
D+H office in Markham, Ontario

D+H (originally Davis & Henderson) was a Canadian global payments and lending technology provider serving nearly 8,000 financial institutions, specialty lenders, community banks, credit unions, governments and corporations, including Canada's five largest banks. D+H was headquartered in Toronto, Ontario, and had more than 5,500 employees in 15 countries, with annual revenues in excess of $1.5 billion. Following its acquisition of Harland Financial Solutions in 2013, over a third of D+H's business was based in the US.

D+H was ranked 21st on IDC Financial Insights's Top 100 FinTech Rankings, and 25th on American Banker's Top 100 Companies in FinTech.

In 2017, D+H was acquired for $4.8 billion by Vista Equity Partners, an American private equity firm. Vista then merged the company with British software provider Misys. The merged company was relaunched in June 2017 and rebranded as Finastra.

== History ==
In 1875, D+H was founded as Davis & Henderson, a Canadian manufacturer specializing in bookbinding and printing. By the latter part of the 1890s, Canadian financial institutions began to form a significant portion of D+H's customer base.

In the 1960s, D+H started to produce printed cheques with Magnetic Ink Character Recognition (MICR) encoding and began printing individually personalized bank cheques. It continued to focus on the cheque business through the 1970s and 1980s.

Following a series of acquisitions starting in 2005, D+H shifted its business to providing financial technology services globally. However, a third of D+H's revenue still came from printing and supplying cheques. In 2016, D+H integrated blockchain distributed ledger technology into its payments platform.

D+H went public on the Toronto Stock Exchange in January 2011. It acquired Mortgagebot and ASSET Inc. in 2011, Avista Solutions in 2012, Harland Financial Solutions and Compushare in 2013, and Fundtech in 2015.
