= MS Midas =

Finnish cargo ship

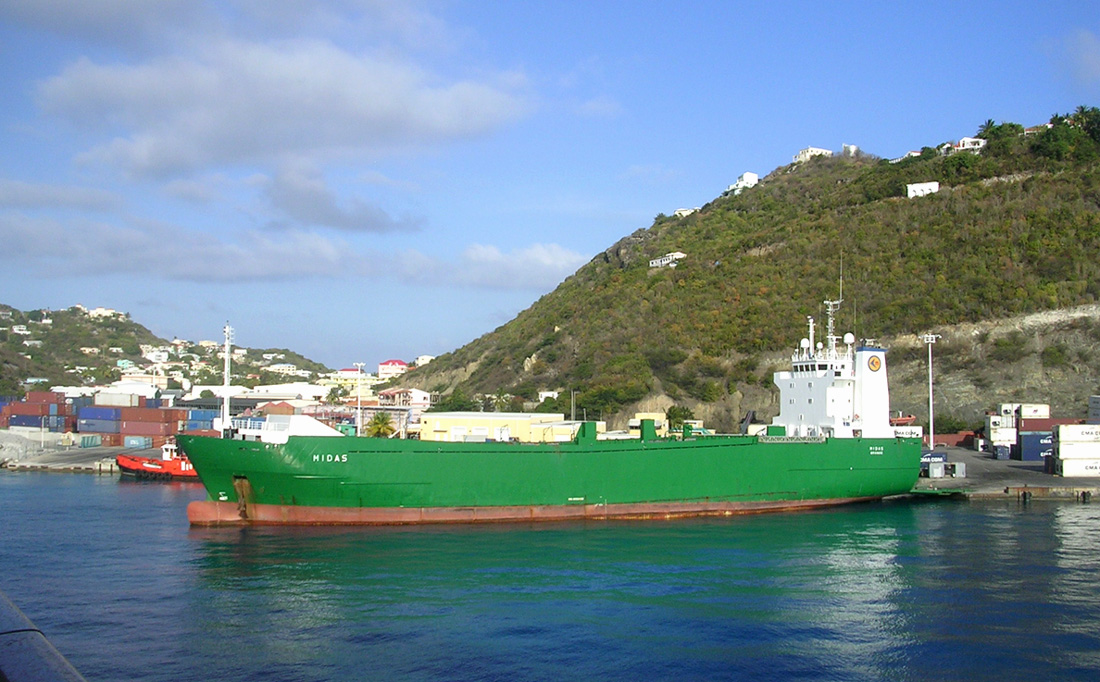

History
- Name: Midas
- Operator: Godby Shipping
- Port of registry: Mariehamn, Åland, Finland
- Builder: J. J. Sietas
- Launched: 31 January 1990
- Completed: 9 March 1990
- Identification: IMO number: 9002659; MMSI number: 230186000; Callsign: OIZZ

General characteristics
- Tonnage: 5,873 gt 4,234 dwt
- Length: 108.52 metres (356.0 ft)
- Beam: 17.47 metres (57.3 ft)
- Decks: 2

Midas (IMO 9002659) is a ro-ro cargo ship operated by Godby Shipping of Åland. It was built in 1990 by J. J. Sietas of Hamburg, Germany, and measures 108.52 metres (356.0 ft) by 17.47 metres (57.3 ft), with a gross tonnage of 5873 and deadweight of 4234 tonnes.

The main engine is a Wartsila Vasa 9R32e, 3.645 KW diesel engine, which runs with a 540 KW shaft generator. The fuel tank has a capacity of 360 cubic metres of oil. The main deck has an area of 1257 square metres, while the weather deck has an area of 1040 square metres.

== Operational history ==
The ship operates around Europe and the Caribbean at an average speed of about 14 knots.

In November 2020, MV Midas rescued the crew of a yacht that had capsized off the coast of Portugal. Whilst the seas were initially too rough to launch Midas' rescue boats, the following morning they were calmer and the three sailors were taken aboard from their life raft. The survivors were taken to the Azores Islands.

In November 2022, MV Midas was chartered to Condor Ferries following Commodore Goodwill suffering damage during drydocking in Spain.

In December 2022, the ship was chartered to Stena Line for the Travemunde to Liepaja route.
