= ITNEA =

Information and TMT Non-Executives' Association
- Abbreviation: ITNEA
- Formation: 1999
- Founder: David Tebbs
- Type: Professional association
- Legal status: Defunct
- Purpose: Representing non-executive directors
- Location: Surrey, United Kingdom
- Region served: United Kingdom
- Services: Networking, lobbying and providing information to members
- Members: 500 (2012)
- Official language: English
- Executive partner: Jane Tozer
- Executive partner: David Tebbs
- Funding: Members fees
- Website: www.itnea.net

ITNEA or Information and TMT Non-Executives' Association was a British association for non-executive Directors (NEDs) and non-executive Chairmen of listed IT, telecommunications and related media companies. It was founded in 1999 and closed down in 2016.

== History ==
The association was founded in 1999 by David Tebbs and became the United Kingdom association for non-executive Directors (NEDs) and non-executive Chairmen of listed IT, telecommunications and related media companies. They were sometimes referred to as telecommunication, media and technology (TMT), or information and communications technology (ICT) companies.

At its peak ITNEA had over 500 members, holding over 1000 directorships between them. These directorships ranged from private start-ups to FTSE 100 companies, in all sectors, both UK and international. The common thread was that to qualify for membership, they must hold a non-executive directorship or Chairmanship of a quoted technology company (or an executive directorship of such where the person has or wants a non-executive role as well). ITNEA was founded by David Tebbs in 1998.

The organisation ceased operating in November 2016, when a notice was posted to the associations website.

== Objectives ==
- Act as a networking forum for non-executive directors and chairmen, giving them the opportunity to meet and discuss the particular issues faced in these roles with others in similar positions.
- Draw to members' attention important lobbying opportunities, where issues that will affect them or their companies are under review.
- Provide members with information on non executive director and chairman appointments through an advertising service open to companies and their advisors and agents. Advertising service open to companies and their advisors and agents.

== Activity ==
The members met several times per year often with a guest speaker covering a topic of importance to members. Meetings were structured to facilitate member networking. Past speakers included: the e-Envoy, The Director General of the CBI, a remuneration and share option consultant, fund managers, the Director General of the IoD, financial analysts, a Chairman of an FTSE 100 company, venture capitalists, a leading M&A advisor, legal specialists and others. Members were occasionally invited to attend functions with a wider audience.
