= Minibus Driver Awareness Scheme =

Training and registration scheme for drivers of minibuses in the UK

The Minibus Driver Awareness Scheme, usually abbreviated to MiDAS, is a training and registration scheme for drivers of minibuses in the UK.

Following a number of serious accidents where drivers and passengers using minibuses were killed or seriously injured in the 1990s Hampshire County Council, with the involvement of Driver Education Centres Southampton set up MiDAS.RoSPA was not involved initially but may have been partially involved later and the Community Transport Association joined in actively and later ran the scheme., They created a programme to train and assess the competence of drivers. It may optionally include certification to use tail lifts and adaptations for wheelchairs that permit the passenger to travel safely whilst remaining in the chair.

Most volunteer drivers driving for community organisations and schools are now required to have and maintain their MiDAS qualification in order to carry out their duties, no matter that their normal driving licence may already entitle them to drive a minibus.
