= Finastra =

British financial Software company

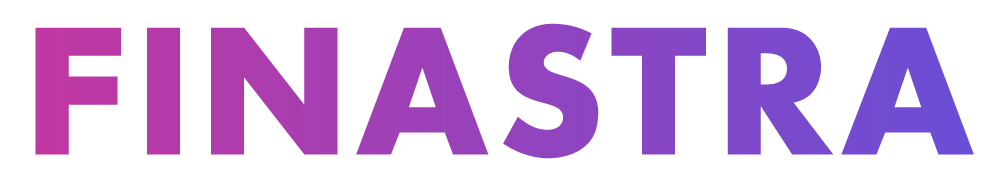
- Type: Private
- Industry: Information technology Financial technology Banking software
- Predecessors: Misys, D+H
- Founded: 2017; 9 years ago
- Headquarters: London, England, United Kingdom
- Products: Financial software
- Revenue: USD $1.9 billion
- Owner: Vista Equity Partners
- Number of employees: 7,000+ (2023)
- Website: finastra.com

Finastra is a global financial services software company headquartered in London. Its US hub is found in Atlanta, Georgia. It provides software for Lending and Corporate Banking, Payments, and Retail and Digital Banking.

Finastra recently announced that it will divest its Universal Banking Business Unit in the coming months. When the sale is complete, the company will give its core focus to Lending and Payments.

Finastra was formed in 2017 by the combination of London-based Misys, a provider of financial operations software, and Canadian-based payments and lending technology provider D+H.

Finastra has customers in hundreds of countries, including banks, financial institutions, and credit unions.

== Finastra 2017 - present ==
At the time of its formation (June 2017), Finastra was considered the third-largest financial services technology company in the world. It was led by Nadeem Syed in the role of Chief Executive Officer.

Simon Paris joined Finastra in 2015 (previously Misys) and was made CEO of Finastra in 2018.

In April 2018, Finastra launched an innovation lab in Hong Kong to enable collaboration between banks and other fintech companies.

In June 2018, Finastra, launched FusionFabric.cloud, an open platform to develop apps, connect ecosystems and foster collaboration between banks and fintechs.

This period centered on acceleration into cloud, AI-driven insights, and data-led transformation for customers.

In January 2025, Chris Walters was appointed CEO, ushering in a period of strategic reset and growth focus, with a focus on customer centricity and partnering with customers on innovation.

In 2026, Finastra launched its AI Center of Excellence, led by Chris McClellan.

Acquisitions by Finastra
Olfa Soft	FX e-trading platform	January 2018
Malauzai	Mobile and internet banking solutions for community financial institutions.	June 2018

Divestments by Finastra
Treasury and Capital Markets (TCM) Business Unit	Finastra sold its treasury and capital markets (TCM) Business Unit to Apax Partners. TCM rebranded as Teciem (pronounced TCM) and operates as an independent company.	February 2026
U.S. Mid-Market Business	Finastra sold its USMM business to CORA Group	June 2026
Universal Banking Business Unit	Finastra announced the sale of its Universal Banking Business Unit to Pollen Street. Once the deal closes Finastra will focus on payments and lending.	June 2026
Filogix Mortgage Technology	Dominion Lending Centres Acquires Filogix	August 2026

=== Products ===
Finastra offers solutions across lending and corporate banking, payments and retail and digital banking:

Lending, led by Andrew Bateman, EVP, Lending, Finastra
Loan IQ	A comprehensive commercial loan servicing platform used by global banks to manage complex syndicated and bilateral lending.
LaserPro	A loan documentation solution utilized by financial institutions to produce compliant lending documents for consumer, commercial, and mortgage products.
Trade Innovation	A trade finance platform that automates and manages global trade transactions such as letters of credit and guarantees.
Corporate Channels	Digital platforms for corporate banking solutions including trade finance, cash management, lending and treasury services.
Mortgagebot	An online mortgage origination platform that streamlines the mortgage application process for lenders and borrowers.

Payments, led by Barry Rodrigues, EVP, Payments, Finastra
Global PAYplus	A global payments processing hub that centralizes and automates multiple payment types for banks.
Payments To Go	A cloud-based payment processing solution offering banks rapid, scalable access to payments services.
Financial Messaging	A solution that enables banks to connect securely to SWIFT and other financial messaging networks to exchange standardized, regulatory-compliant financial messages.

Retail and Digital Banking, led by Siobhan Byron, EVP, Universal Banking, Finastra
Essence	A core banking system designed to deliver retail and commercial banking services with a focus on digital transformation.

== History ==
=== Misys ===
The company was founded in 1970 by Roger Morgan and Kevin Lomax as Misys to develop insurance software. It grew through a number of acquisitions, into healthcare and broader financial services.

In October 2006, Mike Lawrie was appointed CEO.

Acquisitions by Misys
Kapiti	Misys acquired a UK banking software provider.	March 1994
ACT Group	Formed a leading UK banking software group.	February 1995
Summit Systems & FIT SA	Misys buys US-based Summit Systems (derivatives software) and its French partner Finance Information et Technologie SA.	December 1996
Medic Computer Systems	A healthcare software business.	October 1997
C-ATS (CATS) Software	A US risk management software provider to strengthen its capital markets solutions.	December 1998
DBS Management	A supplier of software to Independent Financial Advisors.	June 2001
Sunquest Information Systems	A United States-based supplier of medical systems software.	June 2001
IQ Financial Systems	Misys bought a US commercial lending software unit (Loan IQ) from Deutsche Bank.	January 2004
Almonde	Misys buys a French banking risk management software firm to enhance its risk/ALM offerings.	July 2005
Intesio	Misys buys a German multi-channel retail banking software provider to strengthen digital banking solutions.	February 2006
NEOMAlogic	Misys buys a Paris-based web trade finance technology firm to expand trade finance offerings.	March 2006
Sophis	Misys bought Sophis, a provider of portfolio and risk management software.	November 2010
IND Group	Misys bought Hungary-based IND Group, a supplier of online and mobile banking software.	February 2014
Custom Credit Systems	Misys bought Custom Credit Systems, a US-based supplier of credit workflow and loan origination software.	August 2014

Divestments by Misys
Diagnostic Information Software Division	Misys sold its diagnostic information software division to Vista Equity Partners.	July 2007

Mergers
Misys Healthcare x Allscripts	Misys Healthcare, was merged with Allscripts, a medical records business, to become Allscripts-Misys Healthcare Solutions, Inc.	October 2008
Vista x Misys	Private equity firm Vista Equity Partners announced that it had reached an agreement to acquire Misys.	March 2012
Misys x Turaz	Upon the completion of the acquisition by Vista Equity Partners, Misys was merged with Turaz, another acquisition of Vista. Turaz was formerly the treasury and risk management software division of Thomson Reuters.	June 2012
Misys x D+H	Vista Equity Partners acquired D+H and combined it with Misys.	June 2017

=== D+H ===
Following a series of acquisitions starting in 2005, D+H shifted its business to providing financial technology services worldwide.

In 2011, D+H went public on the Toronto Stock Exchange. It returned to the private sector in 2017.

Acquisitions by D+H
ASSET Inc.	Adds Canadian loan origination software provider ASSET Inc. to strengthen its lending solutions.	January 2011
Mortgagebot	Enters US mortgage tech by acquiring Mortgagebot LLC (web-based mortgage origination platform).	March 2011
Avista Solutions	Online lending platform - Expands US mortgage SaaS offering.	April 2012
Harland Financial Solutions	Lending and compliance technology including LaserPro and Phoenix).	August 2013
Compushare	D+H acquired full ownership of California-based Compushare Inc., as part of its strategic focus on financial technology services for community banks and credit unions across the United States.	September 2013
Fundtech (for $1.25b)	A major fintech provider	June 2015

In 2016, D+H added blockchain technology capabilities to its global payments platform. The added capabilities enabled banks that used its Global PAYplus services platform to access distributed ledgers to connect networks, move money in real-time and improve access to liquidity.

On 17 June 2017, D+H announced that it would be acquired by Vista Equity Partners and combined with Misys, operating under the new company name Finastra for a total enterprise value of approximately $4.8 billion.
