= Property technology =

Application of IT and economics to real estate

Property technology (also known as by the portmanteaus proptech, PropTech, prop-tech and also known as real estate technology) is used to refer to the application of information technology and platform economics to the real estate industry. Property technology overlaps with financial technology, including uses like online payment and booking systems.

== Overview ==
Property technology encompasses any application of digital technology or platform economics in the real estate industry. Some examples of property technology include property management using digital dashboards, smart home technology, research and analytics, listing services/tech-enabled brokerages, mobile applications, residential and commercial lending, 3D-modeling for online portals, automation, crowdfunding real estate projects, shared spaces management, as well as organizing, analyzing, and extracting key data from lengthy rental documents.

According to economist Richard Reed, the real estate industry has historically been conservative in its approach to technology, and is slower to adopt new technologies than other industries.

Advances in the residential side of real estate technology encompass some target areas, but generally aim to reduce friction in the purchase, sale, or rental of a property. Areas of focus include finding a home, selling a home, financing a purchase, closing on a property (including valuation, title & escrow, and title insurance), managing a property, managing loans, and mortgage lending software. Many proptech companies have seen a spike in demand for these solutions as the COVID-19 pandemic has jolted management companies from their "business as usual" routine.

== History of real estate technology ==
The history of property technology is often divided into three stages of development. These stages broadly correspond to the period from 1980 to 2000, from 2000 to 2008, and from 2008 to the present.

Digital technology began to be adopted by the real estate industry during the 1980s, when personal computing became more common. Spreadsheet and accounting software like Microsoft Excel began to be used by real estate companies when they were first introduced. Advancements in the area of investment analysis also allowed real estate investors to more accurately assess the value of commercial real estate using larger databases of information.

The second stage began as real estate technology first targeted consumers during the dot-com bubble. At a time when most sales and residential listings were on print media and real estate offices, companies began to focus on moving listings onto the digital media. From 2008 onwards, the widespread availability of high speed internet meant that real estate companies could move more of their data and services online. Real estate databases such as Zillow are an example of information such as geographic data, property valuation and real estate advice being moved online.

The rise of digital technology during the 21st century has led to the development of a sharing economy, where applications such as ridesharing platforms became common. This also extended to real estate, as websites such as Airbnb and WeWork made it possible for property owners to rent out their property for part of the year.

The COVID-19 accelerated the adoption of information technology in the real estate industry. The pandemic helped to drive e-commerce and resulted in the closure of many traditional retail stores, which has impacted the commercial real estate industry. Blockchain technology has also been used to track property for the purposes of land registration and resolve potential ownership disputes.

Post pandemic, proptech is increasingly influenced by wider societal concerns, such as town planning, and public sector applications. An example of this can be seen in the UK, where the government started a 'proptech innovation fund'. Under the banner of 'proptech' this saw initially investment in citizen involvement solutions. More recent developments see applications in land assessment.

== Investment in real estate technology ==
During the 2010s, numerous property technology startups were created, dealing with aspects of real estate such as design and construction, listings, and transactions. These startups have been supported by seed funding and investment from a range of sources, particularly venture capital funds.

In 2015, investment into property technology grew, with more than $1.7 billion in funding being invested across over 190 deals. This represented a 50% increase year-over-year and a 821% increase in funding compared to 2011. Deal activity also increased, growing 378% with respect to 2011's total, and 12% year-over-year. This investment appeared to increase further in 2017 to £8.5 billion. In the first six months of 2019, $12.9 billion of venture capital funding was invested into real-estate technology startups, which surpassed the $12.7 billion of investments in 2017.

== See also ==
- Qstay
