= Ray Stevens discography =

- Studio albums: 54
- Extended plays: 1
- Live albums: 3
- Compilation albums: 67
- Singles: 125
- Music videos: 75
- Box sets: 3
- No. 1 singles: 2

The discography of the American country, pop, and novelty artist Ray Stevens consists of 50 studio albums, 125 singles, 3 live albums, 67 compilation albums, 3 box sets, and 1 extended play. Stevens released his first single in 1957 and his first full album in 1962. Dozens of Stevens' singles have charted on the Billboard Hot Country Songs chart and two of them reached #1 on the Billboard Hot 100 chart: "The Streak" and "Everything Is Beautiful". The former and a cover of the jazz standard "Misty" are his biggest hits on the country charts.

== Studio albums ==
=== 1960s ===
Year	Album	US
1962	1,837 Seconds of Humor	135
1963	This Is Ray Stevens	—
1968	Even Stevens	—
1969	Gitarzan	57
1969	Have a Little Talk with Myself	—

=== 1970s ===
Year	Album	Chart positions			
Year	Album	US Country	US	AUS	CAN
1970	Everything Is Beautiful	—	35	—	28
1970	Unreal!!!	—	141	—	—
1972	Turn Your Radio On	14	175	—	—
1973	Losin' Streak	—	—	—	—
1973	Nashville	36	—	—	—
1974	Boogity Boogity	10	159	85	82
1975	Misty	3	106	37	—
1976	Just for the Record	34	—	—	—
1977	Feel the Music	50	—	—	—
1978	There Is Something on Your Mind	—	—	—	—
1978	Be Your Own Best Friend	—	—	—	—

=== 1980s ===
Year	Album	Chart positions			RIAA
Year	Album	US Country	US	AUS	RIAA
1980	Shriner's Convention	4	132	—	—
1981	One More Last Chance	—	—	—	—
1982	Don't Laugh Now	—	—	—	—
1983	Me	—	—	—	—
1984	He Thinks He's Ray Stevens	3	118	—	Platinum
1985	I Have Returned	1	—	98	Gold
1986	Surely You Joust	11	—	—	—
1987	Crackin' Up!	25	—	—	—
1988	I Never Made a Record I Didn't Like	52	—	—	—
1989	Beside Myself	51	—	—	—

=== 1990s ===
Year	Album	Chart positions	
Year	Album	US Country	US Comedy
1990	Lend Me Your Ears	—	—
1991	#1 with a Bullet	60	14
1993	Classic Ray Stevens	—	—
1997	Hum It	—	—
1997	Ray Stevens Christmas: Through a Different Window	69	—

=== 2000s ===
Year	Album	Chart positions
Year	Album	US Country
2000	Ear Candy	—
2002	Osama—Yo' Mama: The Album	29
2004	Thank You!	—
2007	New Orleans Moon	—
2008	Hurricane	—
2009	Ray Stevens Sings Sinatra...Say What??	—
2009	One for the Road	—
2009	Christmas	—

=== 2010s ===
Year	Album	Chart positions	
Year	Album	US Country	US Comedy
2010	We the People	58	4
2011	Spirit of '76	—	—
2011	Bozo's Back Again	—	—
2014	Ray Stevens Gospel Collection, Volume One	—	—
2015	Here We Go Again!	—	4
2016	Just a Closer Walk with Thee: Gospel Favorites	—	—
2016	Love Lifted Me	—	—
2016	Mary and Joseph and the Baby and Me	—	—

=== 2020s ===
Year	Album
2021	Great Country Ballads
2021	Melancholy Fescue (High Class Bluegrass)
2021	Slow Dance
2021	Nouveau Retro (What's Old Is New Again)
2021	Ain't Nothin' Funny Anymore
2025	Say Whut?
2026	Favorites Old & New

== Live albums ==
Year	Album
1995	Ray Stevens Live!
2012	Such a Night! 50 Years of Hits & Hilarity 0n Stage…Alive!
2012	Patriots and Politics: Live on Stage

== EPs ==
Year	Album
1963	Ray "Ahab the Arab" Stevens and Hal Winters

== Box sets ==
Year	Album
1995	The Incredible World of Ray Stevens
2006	Box Set
2012	Encyclopedia of Recorded Comedy Music
2021	Iconic Songs of the 20th Century: The Soundtrack of Our Lives

== Compilation albums ==
Year	Album	Chart positions		RIAA
Year	Album	US Country	US Comedy	RIAA
1967	The Best of Ray Stevens	—	—	—
1968	The Best of Ray Stevens	—	—	—
1971	Rock & Roll Show (reissue of 1,837 Seconds of Humor)	—	—	—
1971	Ray Stevens' Greatest Hits	15	95	—
1975	The Very Best of Ray Stevens	19	173	—
1976	Both Sides of Ray Stevens	—	—	—
1977	The Many Sides of Ray Stevens	—	—	—
1977	The Remarkable Ray Stevens: 20 Incredible Hits	—	—	—
1979	The Feeling's Not Right Again	—	—	—
1979	The Ray Stevens Greatest Hits Collection	—	—	—
1979	The Best of Ray Stevens	—	—	—
1980	Wild and Crazy	—	—	—
1981	Oh Lonesome Me	—	—	—
1983	Greatest Hits	67	—	—
1984	Ray Stevens Collection	—	—	—
1984	Ray Stevens Greatest Hits	—	—	—
1985	Ray Stevens Collector's Series	—	—	—
1986	The Very Best of Ray Stevens/Roger Miller	—	—	—
1987	Greatest Hits, Vol. 1	41	—	Platinum
1987	Get the Best of Ray Stevens	—	—	—
1987	Greatest Hits, Vol. 2	62	—	Gold
1989	Funny Man	—	—	—
1990	His All-Time Greatest Comic Hits	—	—	Gold
1991	Greatest Hits	—	—	—
1992	Ahab the Arab	—	—	—
1992	Everything Is Beautiful & Other Hits	—	—	—
1992	Mississippi Squirrel Revival (reissue of He Thinks He's Ray Stevens)	—	—	—
1992	A Brighter Day	—	—	—
1992	The Gospel Side of Ray Stevens	—	—	—
1992	Ray Stevens/Jim Stafford	—	—	—
1992	Ray Stevens – At His Best (reissue of Beside Myself)	—	—	—
1995	Get Serious! Soundtrack	—	—	—
1995	Cornball	—	—	—
1995	Serious Side of Ray Stevens	—	—	—
1995	20 Comedy Hits	—	—	
1997	The Streak	—	—	—
1997	Gitarzan	—	—	—
1997	The Biggest and the Best	—	—	—
1997	The Best of Ray Stevens	—	—	—
1997	Golden Classics	—	—	—
1997	The Country Hits Collection	—	—	—
1998	Back 2 Back	—	—	—
1999	The Last Laugh	—	—	—
1999	Misty: The Very Best of Ray Stevens	—	—	—
2000	Funniest Characters	—	—	—
2002	12 Hits	—	—	—
2003	Classic Masters	—	—	—
2003	The Collection	—	—	—
2004	20th Century Masters – The Millennium Collection: The Best of Ray Stevens	—	—	—
2004	The Ones You Want	—	—	—
2005	The NRC Years	—	—	—
2008	Greatest Hits: The 50th Anniversary Collection	—	—	—
2008	Only The Best of Ray Stevens	—	—	—
2009	Laughter Is the Best Medicine	—	—	—
2010	A Funny Thing Happened in Church Today	—	—	—
2014	Ahab, Jeremiah, Sgt Preston and More...: The Early Ray Stevens	—	—	—
2016	Face the Music: The Complete Monument Singles, 1965-1970	—	—	—
2016	Love Lifted Me	—	—	—

== Singles ==
=== 1950s and 1960s ===
Year	Single (A-side, B-side) Both sides from same album except where indicated	Peak chart positions					Album
Year	Single (A-side, B-side) Both sides from same album except where indicated	US CB	US BB	US R&B	CAN	AUS	Album
1957	"Rang Tang Ding Dong" b/w "Silver Bracelet"	—	—	—	—	—	Non-album singles
1957	"Five More Steps" b/w "Tingle"	—	—	—	—	—	Non-album singles
1958	"Chickie-Chickie Wah Wah" b/w "Crying Goodbye"	—	—	—	—	—	Non-album singles
1958	"Love Goes on Forever" b/w "Cat Pants"	—	—	—	—	—	Non-album singles
1958	"The Clown" b/w "School"	—	—	—	—	—	Non-album singles
1959	"High School Yearbook - A Deck of Cards" b/w Truly True"	—	—	—	—	—	Non-album singles
1959	"My Heart Cries for You" b/w "What Would I Do Without You?"	—	—	—	—	—	Non-album singles
1959	"Sgt. Preston of the Yukon" b/w "Who Do You Love"	112	108	—	—	—	Non-album singles
1960	"Jeremiah Peabody's Polyunsaturated Quick-Dissolving; Fast-Acting Pleasant-Tasting Green and Purple Pills" b/w "Teen Years" (from This Is Ray Stevens)	38	35	—	—	83	1,837 Seconds of Humor
1961	"Scratch My Back" b/w "When You Wish Upon a Star" (Non-album track)	147	—	—	—	—	1,837 Seconds of Humor
1961	"White Christmas" b/w "Happy Blue Year"	—	—	—	—	—	Non-album single
1962	"Ahab the Arab" b/w "It's Been So Long" (from This Is Ray Stevens)	2	5	9	—	7	1,837 Seconds of Humor
1962	"Further More" b/w "Saturday Night at the Movies'	97	91	—	—	—	1,837 Seconds of Humor
1962	"Santa Claus Is Watching You" b/w "Loved and Lost" (from This Is Ray Stevens)	37	45	—	—	—	Non-album single
1963	"Funny Man" b/w "Just One of Life's Little Tragedies"	83	81	—	14	—	This Is Ray Stevens
1963	"Harry The Hairy Ape" b/w "Little Stone Statue"	19	17	14	30	72	This Is Ray Stevens
1963	"Speed Ball" b/w "It's Party Time" (Non-album track)	74	59	29	—	—	This Is Ray Stevens
1964	"Butch Barbarian" b/w "Don't Say Anything" (Non-album track)	117	—	—	—	—	Non-album singles
1964	"Bubble Gum the Bubble Dancer" b/w "Laughing Over My Grave" (Non-album track)	—	—	—	—	—	Non-album singles
1965	"The Rockin' Teenage Mummies" b/w "It Only Hurts When I Laugh"	—	—	—	—	—	Non-album singles
1965	"Mr. Baker the Undertaker" b/w "The Old English Surfer"	—	—	—	—	—	Non-album singles
1965	"Party People" b/w "A-B-C"	130	130	—	—	—	Non-album singles
1966	"Devil May Care" b/w "Make a Few Memories"	—	—	—	—	—	Non-album singles
1966	"Freddie Feelgood (and His Funky Little; Five Piece Band)" b/w "There's One in Every Crowd" (Non-album track)	96	91	—	—	22	Gitarzan
1967	"Answer Me, My Love" b/w "Mary My Secretary"	—	—	—	—	95	Non-album single
1968	"Unwind" b/w "For He's a Jolly Good Fellow"	44	52	—	29	—	Even Stevens
1968	"Mr. Businessman" b/w "Face the Music"	15	28	—	7	33	Even Stevens
1968	"The Great Escape" b/w "Isn't It Lonely Together"	88	114	—	43	34	Even Stevens
1969	"Gitarzan" b/w "Bagpipes - That's My Bag"	7	8	—	10	3	Gitarzan
1969	"Along Came Jones" b/w "Yakety Yak"	24	27	—	28	13	Gitarzan
1969	"Sunday Mornin' Comin' Down"^{A} b/w "The Minority" (from Even Stevens)	76	81	—	59	34	Have a Little Talk with Myself
"—" denotes released that failed to chart or were not released

- A "Sunday Mornin' Comin' Down" peaked at number 55 on U.S. Billboard Hot Country Singles and number 46 on Canada RPM Country Tracks.

=== 1970s ===
Year	Single	Peak chart positions									Album
Year	Single	US Country	US	US AC	US CB	UK	CAN Country	CAN	CAN AC	AUS	Album
1970	"Have a Little Talk with Myself" b/w "The Little Woman"	63	123	—	115	—	—	—	—	50	Have a Little Talk with Myself
1970	"I'll Be Your Baby Tonight" b/w "The Fool on the Hill"	—	112	—	117	—	—	—	—	—	Have a Little Talk with Myself
1970	"Everything Is Beautiful" b/w "A Brighter Day"	39	1	1	1	6	—	1	—	1	Everything Is Beautiful
1970	"America, Communicate with Me" b/w "Monkey See, Monkey Do"	—	45	12	38	—	—	34	—	—	Unreal!!!
1970	"Sunset Strip" b/w "Islands"	—	81	17	79	—	—	68	30	—	Unreal!!!
1971	"Bridget the Midget (The Queen of the Blues)" b/w "Night People" (from Unreal!!!)	—	50	—	43	2	—	37	—	61	Boogity Boogity
1971	"A Mama and a Papa" b/w "Melt" (Non-album track)	—	82	4	66	—	—	72	6	—	Turn Your Radio On
1971	"All My Trials" b/w "Have a Little Talk with Myself" (from Have a Little Talk with Myself)	—	70	6	74	—	—	82	—	—	Turn Your Radio On
1971	"Turn Your Radio On" b/w "Loving You on Paper" (from Unreal!!!)	17	63	24	102	33	10	—	3	99	Turn Your Radio On
1972	"Love Lifted Me" b/w "Glory Special"	—	—	—	—	—	—	—	—	—	Turn Your Radio On
1972	"Losing Streak" b/w "Inside"	—	—	—	—	—	—	—	—	—	Losin' Streak
1973	"Nashville" b/w "Golden Age"	37	—	44	—	—	70	—	29	83	Nashville
1973	"Love Me Longer" b/w "Float"	—	—	—	—	—	—	—	—	—	Nashville
1974	"The Streak" b/w "You've Got the Music Inside" (from Nashville)	3	1	12	1	1	1	1	1	2	Boogity Boogity
1974	"Moonlight Special" b/w "Just So Proud to Be Here"	—	73	—	55	—	—	59	26	—	Boogity Boogity
1974	"Everybody Needs a Rainbow" b/w "Inside" (from Losin' Streak)	37	—	18	83	—	—	—	16	—	Non-album single
1975	"Misty" b/w "Sunshine"	3	14	8	16	2	2	15	6	5	Misty
1975	"Indian Love Call" b/w "Piece of Paradise" (Non-album track)	38	68	—	63	34	—	—	—	—	Misty
1976	"Young Love" b/w "Deep Purple"	48	93	44	87	—	47	—	—	—	Misty
1976	"Lady of Spain" b/w "Mockingbird Hill"	—	108	—	—	—	—	—	—	—	Misty
1976	"You Are So Beautiful" b/w "One Man Band"	16	101	—	—	—	17	—	—	—	Just for the Record
1976	"Honky Tonk Waltz" b/w "Om"	27	—	—	—	38	—	—	—		Just for the Record
1977	"In the Mood" b/w "Classical Cluck; Shown as "Henhouse Five Plus Too"	39	40	38	37	31	—	—	—	—	Non-album single
1977	"Get Crazy with Me" /	81	—	—	—	—	—	—	—	—	Feel the Music
1977	"Dixie Hummingbird"	44	—	—	—	—	43	—	—	—	Feel the Music
1978	"Be Your Own Best Friend" b/w "With a Smile"	36	—	50	—	—	16	—	—	—	Be Your Own Best Friend
1979	"I Need Your Help Barry Manilow" b/w "Daydream Romance"	85	49	11	34	—	—	63	—	92	The Feeling's Not Right Again
"—" denotes released that failed to chart or were not released

=== 1980s and 1990s ===
Year	Single (A-side, B-side)	Peak chart positions		Album
Year	Single (A-side, B-side)	US Country	CAN Country	Album
1980	"Shriner's Convention"^{B} b/w "You're Never Goin' to Tampa with Me"	7	2	Shriner's Convention
1980	"Night Games" b/w "Let's Do It Right This Time"	20	11	One More Last Chance
1981	"One More Last Chance" b/w "I Believe You Love Me"	33	46	One More Last Chance
1982	"Written Down in My Heart" b/w "Country Boy, Country Club Girl"	35	—	Don't Laugh Now
1982	"Where the Sun Don't Shine" b/w "Why Don't We Go Somewhere and Love"	63	—	Don't Laugh Now
1983	"Mary Lou Nights" b/w "Piece of Paradise Called Tennessee"	—	—	Me
1984	"My Dad" b/w "Me"	64	—	Me
1984	"I'm Kissin' You Goodbye" b/w "Joggin'"	—	—	He Thinks He's Ray Stevens
1985	"Mississippi Squirrel Revival" b/w "Ned Nostril (and His South Seas Paradise)"	20	32	He Thinks He's Ray Stevens
1985	"It's Me Again, Margaret" b/w "Joggin'"	74	—	He Thinks He's Ray Stevens
1985	"The Haircut Song" b/w "Punk Country Love"	45	—	I Have Returned
1985	"Santa Claus Is Watching You" (re-recording) b/w "Armchair Quarterback"	—	—	I Have Returned
1986	"The Ballad of the Blue Cyclone" b/w "Vacation Bible School"	50	—	I Have Returned
1986	"Southern Air" (with Jerry Clower and Minnie Pearl) b/w "The Camping Trip"	63	—	Surely You Joust
1986	"People's Court" b/w "Dudley Dorite (Of the Highway Patrol)"	70	—	Surely You Joust
1986	"Can He Love You Half as Much as I" b/w "Dudley Dorite (Of the Highway Patrol)"	—	—	Surely You Joust
1987	"Would Jesus Wear a Rolex" b/w "Cool Down Willard"	41	45	Crackin' Up
1987	"Three Legged Man" b/w "Doctor Doctor (Have Mercy on Me)"	—	—	Crackin' Up
1987	"Sex Symbols" b/w "The Ballad of Cactus Pete and Lefty"	—	—	Crackin' Up
1988	"Surfin' U.S.S.R." b/w "Language, Nudity, Violence and Sex"	—	—	I Never Made a Record I Didn't Like
1988	"The Day I Tried to Teach; Charlene Mackenzie How to Drive" b/w "I Don't Need None of That"	88	—	I Never Made a Record I Didn't Like
1988	"I Saw Elvis in a UFO" b/w "I Used to Be Crazy"	—	—	Beside Myself
1989	"There's a Star Spangled Banner"	—	—	Beside Myself
1990	"Help Me Make It Through the Night"	—	—	Lend Me Your Ears
1991	"Workin' For the Japanese"	62	—	#1 with a Bullet
1991	"Teenage Mutant Kung Fu Chickens"	—	—	#1 with a Bullet
1992	"Power Tools"	72	—	#1 with a Bullet
1993	"If 10% Is Good Enough for Jesus"	—	—	Classic Ray Stevens
1993	"The Motel Song"	—	—	Classic Ray Stevens
1993	"Super Cop"	—	—	Classic Ray Stevens
1997	"Mama Sang Bass"	—	—	Hum It
1997	"Too Drunk to Fish"	—	—	Hum It
1997	"Virgil and the Moonshot"	—	—	Hum It
1997	"Nightmare Before Christmas"	—	—	Ray Stevens Christmas: Through a Different Window
From 1989 on, tracks were released as CD singles "—" denotes released that failed to chart or were not released

- B "Shriner's Convention" peaked at #101 on U.S. Billboard Bubbling Under Hot 100 Singles and #95 on U.S. Cash Box Top 100.

=== 2000s, 2010s and 2020s ===
Year	Single	Peak chart positions	Album
Year	Single	US Country	Album
2002	"Osama – Yo' Mama"	48	Osama – Yo' Mama: The Album
2004	"Thank You"	—	Thank You
2005	"We're Having a Baby"	—	Box Set
2006	"The New Battle of New Orleans"	—	Non-album single
2008	"Hurricane"	—	Hurricane
2009	"Concrete Sailor"	—	One for the Road
2009	"Cooter Brown"	—	One for the Road
2009	"If 10% Is Good Enough for Jesus"	—	We The People
2009	"We the People"	—	We The People
2010	"Thank You"	—	We The People
2010	"Caribou Barbie"	—	We The People
2010	"Come to the U.S.A."	—	We The People
2010	"Throw the Bums Out!"	—	We The People
2010	"The Global Warming Song"	—	We The People
2010	"God Save Arizona"	—	Spirit of '76
2011	"The Skies Just Ain't Friendly Anymore"	—	Spirit of '76
2011	"Obama Budget Plan"	—	Spirit of '76
2011	"Mr. President - Mr. President"	—	Spirit of '76
2012	"Obama Nation"	—	Spirit of '76
2012	"Grandpa Voted Democrat"	—	Spirit of '76
2012	"Guilt For Christmas"	—	Non-album singles
2012	"Blue Christmas"	—	Non-album singles
2012	"White Christmas"	—	Non-album singles
2012	"Merry Christmas"	—	Non-album singles
2012	"Redneck Christmas"	—	Non-album singles
2013	"Red Hot Chili Cookoff"	—	Non-album singles
2013	"Unchained Melody"	—	Non-album singles
2014	"If You Like Your Plan"	—	Here We Go Again
2014	"Nero Fiddled"	—	Here We Go Again
2015	"Taylor Swift Is Stalking Me"	—	Here We Go Again
2015	"You Didn’t Build That"	—	Here We Go Again
2015	"Come to the USA"	—	Here We Go Again
2016	"Dear America"	—	Non-album single
2016	"Mary and Joseph and the Baby and Me"	—	Mary and Joseph and the Baby and Me
2020	"Everything Is Beautiful" (50th Anniversary Edition)	—	Non-album singles
2020	"The Quarantine Song"	—	Non-album singles
2021	"Gas"	—	Ain't Nothin' Funny Anymore
2021	"Hoochie Coochie Dancer"	—	Ain't Nothin' Funny Anymore
"—" denotes released that failed to chart or were not released

== Music videos ==
Ray Stevens recognized the power of the music video in the mid-80s and has been releasing them ever since. Ray released a direct-to-video collection of these videos in 1992 called Ray Stevens Comedy Video Classics, which won Billboard Home Video of the Year in 1993. In 1995, Stevens released his film Get Serious! which consisted of several music videos. A series of animated videos were released between 2004 and 2006 (with prototypes mixing with live action in 2002 and 2003), which revisited many of Stevens' most popular hits. Ray returned to live action with a series of direct-to-YouTube music videos starting with 2009's "We The People". Some of Stevens' music videos have gone viral and most of them have garnered millions of unique views. In 2012, Stevens released a series of non-album Christmas music videos. Since then he has continued to sporadically release direct-to-YouTube music videos.

Year	Video
1985	"Santa Claus Is Watchin' You"
1988	"Surfin' USSR"
1990	"Help Me Make It Through the Night"
1990	"Sittin' Up With the Dead"
1992	"The Mississippi Squirrel Revival"
1992	"It's Me Again, Margaret"
1992	"Everything Is Beautiful"
1992	"The Streak"
1995	"Shriner's Convention"
1995	"Gitarzan"
1995	"The Woogie Boogie"
1995	"Dudley Dorite of the Highway Patrol"
1995	"The Dooright Family"
1995	"We Don't Take Nothin' Off Nobody"
1995	"Ain't Nobody Here But Us Chickens"
1995	"Can He Love You Half as Much as I?"
1995	"I Used to Be Crazy"
1995	"Ahab the Arab"
1997	"Virgil and the Moonshot"
1997	"Too Drunk to Fish"
2000	"Juanita and the Kids"
2000	"The Pirate Song"
2000	"The Haircut Song"
2000	"Freddie Feelgood (and His Funky Little Five Piece Band)"
2000	"The Ballad of the Blue Cyclone, Parts 1 and 2"
2002	"Osama Yo' Mama" (Animated)
2002	"Hello Mama" (Animated)
2003	"Bridget the Midget (Queen of the Blues)" (Animated)
2003	"Deerslayer" (Animated)
2003	"Hang Up and Drive" (Animated)
2003	"Erik the Awful" (Animated)
2003	"Gone for Good" (Animated
2004	"Thank You"
2004	"Power Tools" (Animated)
2006	"Teenage Mutant Kung Fu Chickens" (Animated)
2006	"Misty" (Animated)
2006	"Harry the Hairy Ape" (Animated)
2006	"Along Came Jones" (Animated)
2006	"Barbeque" (Animated)
2006	"Gourmet Restaurant" (Animated)
2006	"This Ain't Exactly What I Had in Mind" (Animated)
2006	"Jeremiah Peabody's Polyunsaturated Quick-Dissolving Fast-Acting Pleasant-Tasting Green and Purple Pills" (Animated)
2006	"The Ballad of Cactus Pete and Lefty" (Animated)
2006	"Can He Love You Half as Much as I" (Animated)
2006	"Smokey Mountain Rattlesnake Retreat" (Animated)
2006	"Hugo the Human Cannonball" (Animated)
2006	"The Moonlight Special" (Animated)
2006	"The Camping Trip" (Animated)
2009	"We the People"
2010	"Caribou Barbie"
2010	"Throw the Bums Out!"
2010	"Come to the USA"
2010	"The Global Warming Song"
2010	"God Save Arizona"
2010	"Nightmare Before Christmas"
2011	"The Skies Just Ain't Friendly Anymore"
2011	"Obama Budget Plan"
2011	"Mr. President – Mr. President"
2012	"Obama Nation"
2012	"Grandpa Voted Democrat"
2012	"White Christmas"
2012	"Blue Christmas"
2012	"Merry Christmas"
2012	"Redneck Christmas"
2013	"Red Hot Chili Cookoff"
2013	"Aba Daba Honeymoon"
2013	"Doctor Doctor (Have Mercy On Me)"
2013	"Guilt For Christmas"
2013	"Nashville"
2013	"Unchained Melody"
2014	"If You Like Your Plan"
2014	"Nero Fiddled"
2015	"Taylor Swift Is Stalking Me"
2015	"You Didn't Build That"
2015	"Come to the USA"
2016	"Dear America"
2016	"Mary and Joseph and the Baby and Me"
2020	"Everything Is Beautiful" (50th Anniversary Edition)
2021	"Hoochie Coochie Dancer"
2023	"Since Bubba Changed His Name to Charlene"
