= Greatest Hits, Vol. 1 (Ray Stevens album) =

Compilation album by Ray Stevens

Compilation album by Ray Stevens
- Released: February 1987
- Genres: Pop, Country, Novelty
- Label: MCA

Ray Stevens chronology
| The Very Best of Ray Stevens/Roger Miller (1986) | Greatest Hits, Vol. 1 (1987) | Get the Best of Ray Stevens (1987) |

Greatest Hits, Vol. 1 is a collection of ten previously released singles by Ray Stevens, released in 1987. Of the selections of songs, three were recorded for the record label of Monument Records ("Gitarzan," "Along Came Jones," and "Ahab the Arab,"), four for Barnaby Records ("Everything Is Beautiful," "Turn Your Radio On," "The Streak," "Misty"), one for RCA Records ("Shriner's Convention"), and two for MCA Records. The version of "Gitarzan" is the album version that begins with cheering and applauding of an audience. The version of "Ahab the Arab" on this compilation is not the original recording but a re-recording that Stevens made for his album Gitarzan during his career with Monument.

On the back of the album cover, there is a brief essay on Stevens' life and career that covers his beginnings to the time of this collection's release, written by Ronnie Pugh of the Country Music Foundation.

The second volume of this collection was released by MCA eight months later.

== Track listing ==
| No. | Title | Writer(s) | Length |
|---|---|---|---|
| 1. | "The Streak" | Ray Stevens | 3:17 |
| 2. | "Shriner's Convention" | Ray Stevens | 5:33 |
| 3. | "It's Me Again Margaret" | Paul Craft | 3:26 |
| 4. | "Turn Your Radio On" | Albert E. Brumley | 2:09 |
| 5. | "Misty" | Erroll Garner, Johnny Burke | 2:53 |
| 6. | "Mississippi Squirrel Revival" | C.W. Kalb, Jr., Carlene Kalb | 3:42 |
| 7. | "Gitarzan" | Ray Stevens, Bill Everette | 3:14 |
| 8. | "Ahab the Arab" | Ray Stevens | 3:32 |
| 9. | "Along Came Jones" | Jerry Leiber, Mike Stoller | 3:37 |
| 10. | "Everything Is Beautiful" | Ray Stevens | 3:32 |

== Album credits ==
Compiled from liner notes.

- All selections except "Gitarzan" and "Along Came Jones" were produced and arranged by: Ray Stevens
- "Gitarzan" and "Along Came Jones" were produced by Ray Stevens, Fred Foster and Jim Malloy
- "The Streak," "Turn Your Radio On," "Misty," "Gitarzan," "Ahab the Arab," "Along Came Jones," and "Everything Is Beautiful" are through the courtesy of Barnaby Records
- "Shriner's Convention" is through the courtesy of RCA Records
- "It's Me Again Margaret" and "The Mississippi Squirrel Revival" are through the courtesy of MCA Records
- Mastered by Glenn Meadows at Masterfonics using the JVC Digital Audio Mastering System
- Art Direction: Ray Stevens and Slick Lawson
- Photography: Slick Lawson
- Album Graphics: Barnes and Company
- Design: Deb Mahalanobis

== Chart performance ==
| Chart (1987) | Peak position |
|---|---|
| U.S. Billboard Top Country Albums | 41 |
