= His All-Time Greatest Comic Hits =

Compilation album by Ray Stevens
- Released: June 12, 1990
- Genre: Pop, country, novelty, comedy
- Length: 35:24
- Label: Curb
- Producer: Ray Stevens

Ray Stevens chronology
Ray Stevens – At His Best (1989)	His All-Time Greatest Comic Hits (1990)	Lend Me Your Ears (1990)

His All-Time Greatest Comic Hits is a 10-track collection of previously recorded songs by Ray Stevens, released in 1990 by Curb Records. One of the qualities that makes this collection identifiable is that it concentrates solely on Stevens' songs of novelty and comedy. However, the versions of certain songs on this compilation are not original recordings or the most popular versions; the version of "Gitarzan" is the album version that begins with cheering and applauding of an audience; "Ahab, the Arab" is a re-recording that Stevens made for his album Gitarzan; "Freddie Feelgood" is the album version from Gitarzan that contains audience noises.

The album charted at #17 on the Billboard Top Country Catalog Albums chart.

== Track listing ==
No.	Title	Writer(s)	Length
1.	"The Streak"	Ray Stevens	3:17
2.	"Shriner's Convention"	Ray Stevens	5:33
3.	"Would Jesus Wear a Rolex"	Chet Atkins, Margaret Archer	2:46
4.	"Mississippi Squirrel Revival"	C.W. Kalb Jr., Carlene Kalb	3:42
5.	"Gitarzan"	Ray Stevens, Bill Everette	3:14
6.	"It's Me Again, Margaret"	Paul Craft	3:31
7.	"Ahab, the Arab"	Ray Stevens	3:46
8.	"In the Mood"	Joseph Carland, Andy Razaf	2:40
9.	"Freddie Feelgood (And His Funky Little Five-Piece Band)"	Ray Stevens	2:47
10.	"Bridget the Midget (Queen of the Blues)"	Ray Stevens	3:38

== Personnel ==
- Ray Stevens – producer, arranger
- Fred Foster – producer
- Jim Malloy – producer
- Neuman, Walker & Associates – art direction and design
- Marguerite Luciani – album coordination
