= 20 Comedy Hits =

Compilation album by Ray Stevens
- Released: November 7, 1995
- Genre: Novelty, Comedy, Country
- Length: 69:03
- Label: Curb

Ray Stevens chronology
Ray Stevens Live! (1995)	20 Comedy Hits (1995)	Great Gospel Songs (1996)

20 Comedy Hits is a collection of previously recorded songs by Ray Stevens, released in 1995. The first, third, fourth and fifth tracks were included through the courtesy of Barnaby Records, for whom Stevens recorded during the early seventies. The selection of "Shriner's Convention" is a live version that was taken from the album Ray Stevens Live! "Gitarzan" is the album version that begins with audience noises, and "Ahab the Arab" is a re-recording of his 1962 hit for his album Gitarzan (released in 1969). The remaining tracks are selections that were recorded for Curb Records; of these selections, only two were released as singles ("Super Cop" and "The Motel Song") and the rest served as album cuts. The sixth to ninth tracks were taken from the album Classic Ray Stevens, the tenth to thirteenth tracks from #1 With a Bullet, and the last seven from Lend Me Your Ears. Overall, it is not completely accurate to include the word "hits" in the title of this compilation, as it contains only seven songs that were previously released as singles and five of the seven made true impact on the charts.

Inside the album cover is an essay by Barry Alfonso that covers Stevens' life and career from his year of birth to the time of the release of this collection.

== Track listing ==
No.	Title	Writer(s)	Length
1.	"The Streak"	Ray Stevens	3:16
2.	"Shriner's Convention"	Ray Stevens	4:20
3.	"Gitarzan"	Ray Stevens, Bill Everette	3:14
4.	"Ahab the Arab"	Ray Stevens	3:45
5.	"Bridget the Midget (The Queen of the Blues)"	Ray Stevens	3:38
6.	"Super Cop"	C.W. Kalb Jr., Glenn A. Fortner	4:36
7.	"The All-American Two Week Summer Family Vacation"	C.W. Kalb Jr.	3:23
8.	"The Ballad of Jake McClusky"	C.W. Kalb Jr., Glenn A. Fortner	3:42
9.	"The Motel Song"	C.W. Kalb Jr.	2:49
10.	"Teenage Mutant Kung Fu Chickens"	C.W. Kalb Jr.	3:19
11.	"Tabloid News"	C.W. Kalb Jr.	2:41
12.	"Back in the Doghouse Again"	C.W. Kalb Jr., Glenn A. Fortner	3:06
13.	"A Little Blue-Haired Lady"	C.W. Kalb Jr.	2:42
14.	"Sittin' Up With the Dead"	C.W. Kalb Jr.	3:52
15.	"Jack Daniels, You Lied to Me Again"	Bruce Innes	2:33
16.	"Help Me Make It Through the Night"	Kris Kristofferson	2:23
17.	"Used Cars"	C.W. Kalb Jr.	3:45
18.	"Barbeque"	C.W. Kalb Jr.	3:17
19.	"Where Do My Socks Go?"	C.W. Kalb Jr.	3:43
20.	"This Ain't Exactly What I Had in Mind"	C.W. Kalb Jr.	4:00

== Album credits ==
- All tracks except "Gitarzan" were produced and arranged by: Ray Stevens
- "Gitarzan" was produced and arranged by: Ray Stevens, Fred Foster and Jim Malloy
- Art Direction and Design: Neuman, Walker + Assoc.
- Illustration: Jill VonHartmann
- Album Coordination: Sarita Martin

Compiled from liner notes.
