= 20th Century Masters – The Millennium Collection: The Best of Ray Stevens =

Greatest hits album by Ray Stevens
- Released: March 9, 2004
- Genre: Pop, Novelty, Comedy, Country
- Length: 38:50
- Label: Hip-O
- Producer: Mike Ragogna

Ray Stevens chronology
The Collection (2003)	20th Century Masters – The Millennium Collection: The Best of Ray Stevens (2004)	Thank You! (2004)

20th Century Masters – The Millennium Collection: The Best of Ray Stevens is a 12-track collection of previously recorded songs by Ray Stevens, released in 2004. It consists of the biggest hits he had from 1961 to 1987, starting with his breakthrough hit "Jeremiah Peabody's Polyunsaturated Quick-Dissolving Fast-Acting Pleasant-Tasting Green and Purple Pills" to his hit "Would Jesus Wear a Rolex". Unlike many compilations of Stevens' music, this collection contains the original recordings of "Ahab the Arab" and "Harry the Hairy Ape", which were re-recorded for Stevens' fourth studio album Gitarzan. The selections of "Freddie Feelgood", "Mr. Businessman" and "Gitarzan" are album versions, the first and third of which were featured on Gitarzan. Inside the album cover are information on the featured singles (peaking chart positions, producers, record labels, and catalog numbers) and a biographical essay written by Gene Sculatti back in December 2003. In the essay, Sculatti mistakenly says that Gitarzan is the one who shouts, "Shut up, baby! I'm tryin' to sing!" in the song "Gitarzan", as it is actually Jane who shouts this phrase.

== Critical reception ==
Professional ratings
Review scores
Source	Rating
Allmusic	4.5/5 stars

This album received 4.5 out of five stars from Stephen Thomas Erlewine of Allmusic. In his review, Erlewine states that this collection of Stevens' music is one of the better ones because it consists of all of his biggest novelty hits in chronological order. He also states that it might appeal to more casual fans than The Best of Ray Stevens because it "has all the truly big hits -- with the arguable exceptions of "Unwind" and "Santa Claus Is Watching You"—in a cheaper and more concise fashion."

== Track listing ==
No.	Title	Writer(s)	Length
1.	"Jeremiah Peabody's Polyunsaturated Quick-Dissolving Fast-Acting Pleasant-Tasting Green and Purple Pills"	Ray Stevens	2:22
2.	"Ahab the Arab"	Ray Stevens	3:45
3.	"Harry the Hairy Ape"	Ray Stevens	2:48
4.	"Freddie Feelgood (And His Funky Little Five Piece Band)"	Ray Stevens	2:50
5.	"Mr. Businessman"	Ray Stevens	3:39
6.	"Gitarzan"	Ray Stevens, Bill Everette	3:09
7.	"Everything Is Beautiful"	Ray Stevens	3:31
8.	"Turn Your Radio On"	Albert E. Brumley	2:11
9.	"The Streak"	Ray Stevens	3:15
10.	"Misty"	Erroll Garner, Johnny Burke	2:53
11.	"Shriner's Convention"	Ray Stevens	5:36
12.	"Would Jesus Wear a Rolex"	Margaret Archer, Chet Atkins	2:46

== Personnel ==
- Compilation Produced by: Mike Ragogna
- Mastered by: Elliott Federman at SAIE Sound, New York, NY
- Product manager: Robin Kirby
- Art and production manager: Michele Horie
- Licensing: Robin Schwartz
- Editorial assistance: Barry Korkin
- Art direction: Vartan
- Design: Junie Osaki
- Photos: Cover by Marc Morrison courtesy of MCA Archives; panel 5 courtesy Frank Driggs Collection/Chansley Entertainment Archives; Wayne Knight Collection/Chansley Entertainment Archives; panel 6 and inside tray by Slick Lawson courtesy of MCA Archives
- Special thanks to: Steve Kolanjian and Tommy West
- Hip-O Records thanks Bruce Resnikoff, Rozel Alcid, Wendy Lubow, Chris Butler, Harry Cole, Stacy Darrow, Richie Gallo, Rickie Goodman, Anthony Hayes, Steve Heldt, Elliot Kendall, Jason Kleve, Lee Lodyga, Andy McKaie, Patte Medina, Jeff Moscow, David Mucci, Ken Patrick, Michael Rosenberg, Glen Sanatar, Dana Smart, Cameron Smith, Jerry Stine, Heather Whitten and UMVD Sales
