= The Very Best of Ray Stevens =

Compilation album by Ray Stevens
- Released: December 1975
- Genre: Pop, country, novelty, comedy
- Label: Barnaby

Ray Stevens chronology
Misty (1975)	The Very Best of Ray Stevens (1975)	Both Sides of Ray Stevens (1976)

The Very Best of Ray Stevens is a collection of 12 previously released singles that were hits for novelty/country artist, Ray Stevens; it was released in December 1975 by Barnaby Records. While this collection has more emphasis on Stevens' hits for Barnaby, it also contains three from the label of Monument Records ("Unwind," "Mr. Businessman," and "Gitarzan") and two from Mercury Records (Stevens' first label). The version of "Mr. Businessman" is the single release. "Gitarzan" is the album version that begins with an audience cheering and applauding. "Ahab the Arab" is the original recording released by Mercury (Stevens had re-recorded the song for his album Gitarzan in 1969).

== Track listing ==
Side A
No.	Title	Writer(s)	Length
1.	"Misty"	Erroll Garner, Johnny Burke	2:53
2.	"Unwind"	Ray Stevens	3:05
3.	"Turn Your Radio On"	Albert E. Brumley	2:09
4.	"Everything Is Beautiful"	Ray Stevens	3:29
5.	"Mr. Businessman"	Ray Stevens	3:39
6.	"Indian Love Call"	Rudolph Fainl, Otto Harbach, Oscar Hammerstein II	3:26

Side B
No.	Title	Writer(s)	Length
1.	"The Streak"	Ray Stevens	3:15
2.	"Jeremiah Peabody's Poly-Unsaturated Quick Dissolving Fast Acting Pleasant Tasting Green and Purple Pills"	Ray Stevens	2:22
3.	"Nashville"	Ray Stevens	3:05
4.	"Moonlight Special"	Ray Stevens	3:47
5.	"Gitarzan"	Ray Stevens, Bill Everette	3:13
6.	"Ahab the Arab"	Ray Stevens	3:45

== Album credits ==
- All tunes except for the eighth and twelfth tracks were arranged and produced by Ray Stevens for AHAB Productions, Inc.
- "Jeremiah Peabody" and "Ahab the Arab" were produced by Shelby Singleton
- Barnaby Records is distributed by Janus Records, a Division of GRT Corporation
- Album sequencing: Ed DeJoy
- Album Coordination: Allan Mason and Terry Droltz

== Charts ==
Chart (1075)	Peak position
US Billboard Top LPs & Tape	173
US Billboard Top Country LPs	19
