= Ray Stevens' Greatest Hits =

Compilation album by Ray Stevens
- Released: July 1971
- Genre: Pop, Novelty, Country
- Label: Barnaby
- Producer: Ray Stevens

Ray Stevens chronology
| Rock & Roll Show (1971) | Ray Stevens' Greatest Hits (1971) | Turn Your Radio On (1972) |

Ray Stevens' Greatest Hits is a collection of songs that Ray Stevens previously recorded for Barnaby and Monument Records from 1968 to 1971. This marks the first album appearance of Stevens' novelty hit single "Bridget the Midget (The Queen of the Blues)." This collection contains two more singles from Barnaby while the rest are recordings for Monument (five singles and three album tracks). "Gitarzan" is the album version that begins with noises of an audience. "Harry the Hairy Ape" and "Ahab the Arab" are not the original recordings but re-recordings that were made for Monument. "Mr. Businessman" is the album version.

== Track listing ==
Side 1
| No. | Title | Writer(s) | Length |
|---|---|---|---|
| 1. | "Everything Is Beautiful" | Ray Stevens | 3:29 |
| 2. | "Gitarzan" | Ray Stevens, Bill Everette | 3:10 |
| 3. | "Isn't It Lonely Together" | Ray Stevens | 3:11 |
| 4. | "Harry the Hairy Ape" | Ray Stevens | 3:05 |
| 5. | "Have a Little Talk With Myself" | Ray Stevens | 2:58 |
| 6. | "America, Communicate With Me" | Ray Stevens | 3:06 |

Side 2
| No. | Title | Writer(s) | Length |
|---|---|---|---|
| 1. | "Mr. Businessman" | Ray Stevens | 3:40 |
| 2. | "Along Came Jones" | Jerry Leiber, Mike Stoller | 3:41 |
| 3. | "Bridget the Midget (The Queen of the Blues)" | Ray Stevens | 3:37 |
| 4. | "Unwind" | Ray Stevens | 3:10 |
| 5. | "Ahab the Arab" | Ray Stevens | 4:10 |

== Album credits ==
- Produced and Arranged by: Ray Stevens for Ahab Productions
- Cover photo: John Donegan

== Charts ==
Album - Billboard (North America)

| Year | Chart | Position |
|---|---|---|
| 1971 | The Billboard 200 | 95 |
| 1971 | Billboard Top Country Albums | 15 |

Singles - Billboard (North America)

| Year | Single | Chart | Position |
|---|---|---|---|
| 1971 | "Bridget the Midget (The Queen of the Blues)" | Billboard Hot 100 | 50 |
| 1971 | "Bridget the Midget (The Queen of the Blues)" | UK Singles Chart | 2 |
| 1971 | "Bridget the Midget (The Queen of the Blues)" | Canadian RPM Top Singles | 37 |
