= Boogity Boogity =

Studio album by Ray Stevens
- Released: May 1974
- Genre: Pop; country; novelty; comedy
- Label: Barnaby; Janus
- Producer: Ray Stevens

Ray Stevens chronology
Nashville (1973)	Boogity Boogity (1974)	Misty (1975)

Boogity Boogity is the 11th studio album by Ray Stevens, released in 1974, and his sixth for Barnaby Records. For this album, Stevens returns to the genres of novelty and comedy. The album was released to capitalize on the success of his hit single "The Streak", which was inspired by the fad of streaking during that time. Stevens' two songs, "Freddie Feelgood (And His Funky Little Five Piece Band)" and "Bagpipes That's My Bag", were taken from his album Gitarzan and were reissued on this album. The front of the album cover shows Stevens running in a blur, seemingly in the nude, and also contains the phrases "Woosh!!" and "Don't look Ethel!" the latter of which is part of the lyrics to the primary single of the album.

"The Streak" proved to be an even bigger success than Stevens' 1970 hit "Everything Is Beautiful", reaching number one in the US, Canada, the UK, and New Zealand. Its follow-up single, "The Moonlight Special", was lifted from this album, but did not fare as well on the charts. Stevens' 1971 single, "Bridget the Midget (The Queen of the Blues)", first appeared on a collection called Ray Stevens' Greatest Hits, but was reissued on this album, making its first appearance on a studio album.

Janus Records released a version of the album (#6310 301) with the same artwork, but with an extended track listing. Both Barnaby Records and Janus Records were issued by the General Recorded Tape Group.

On May 17, 2005, this album and Stevens' album Nashville were re-released together on one CD.

== Track listing (Barnaby Records) ==
All tracks were written by Ray Stevens, except where noted.

Side 1
No.	Title	Writer(s)	Length
1.	"The Streak"		3:15
2.	"Smith and Jones"		4:53
3.	"Freddie Feelgood (And His Funky Little Five Piece Band)"		2:42
4.	"Bagpipes That's My Bag"		2:56
5.	"Don't Boogie Woogie"	Layng Martine	2:37

Side 2
No.	Title	Writer(s)	Length
1.	"The Moonlight Special"		5:12
2.	"Bridget the Midget (The Queen of the Blues)"		3:37
3.	"Heart Transplant"	Stevens, Elkin Rippey	3:38
4.	"Just So Proud to Be Here"		3:17

== Track listing (Janus Records) ==
All tracks written by Ray Stevens, except where noted.

Side 1
No.	Title	Writer(s)	Length
1.	"The Streak"		3:15
2.	"Smith and Jones"		4:53
3.	"Freddie Feelgood (And His Funky Little Five Piece Band)"		2:42
4.	"Bagpipes That's My Bag"		2:56
5.	"Don't Boogie Woogie"	Martine	2:37
6.	"Alley Oop"	Dallas Frazier	3:13

Side 2
No.	Title	Writer(s)	Length
1.	"The Moonlight Special"		5:12
2.	"Sir Thanks-a-Lot"		3:02
3.	"Heart Transplant"	Stevens, Rippey	3:38
4.	"Just So Proud to Be Here"		3:17
5.	"Mr. Custer"	Al De Lory, Fred Darian, Joseph Van Winkle	3:23
6.	"Little Egypt"	Jerry Leiber, Mike Stoller	3:23

== Album credits ==
- All songs published by: Ahab Music Co., Inc. (BMI)
- Arranged and produced by: Ray Stevens for Ahab Productions, Inc. and GRT Corp.
- Engineer: Tom Knox
- Art direction: Neil Terk
- Cover photo: John Donegan
- Cover art: Kristin Mull
- Vocals, siren whistle: Ray Stevens

== Charts ==
=== Weekly charts ===
Chart (1974)	Peak position
Australia (Kent Music Report)	85
The Billboard 200	159
Billboard Top Country Albums	10
Canadian Albums Chart	82

Singles - Billboard (North America)

Year	Single	Chart	Position
1974	"The Streak"	Billboard Hot 100	1
1974	"The Streak"	Canadian RPM Top Singles	1
1974	"The Streak"	Canadian RPM Country Tracks	1
1974	"The Streak"	Canadian RPM Adult Contemporary Tracks	1
1974	"The Streak"	UK Singles Chart	1
1974	"The Streak"	New Zealand Singles Chart	1
1974	"The Streak"	Irish Singles Chart	2
1974	"The Streak"	Australian Singles Chart	2
1974	"The Streak"	Billboard Hot Country Singles and Tracks	3
1974	"The Streak"	Billboard Adult Contemporary	12
1974	"The Moonlight Special"	Billboard Hot 100	73
1974	"The Moonlight Special"	Canadian RPM Top Singles	59
1974	"The Moonlight Special"	Canadian RPM Adult Contemporary Tracks	26
