= I Have Returned =

Studio album by Ray Stevens
- Released: September 1985
- Genre: Country; novelty
- Label: MCA
- Producer: Ray Stevens

Ray Stevens chronology
Ray Stevens Collector's Series (1985)	I Have Returned (1985)	Surely You Joust (1986)

I Have Returned is the twenty-second studio album by Ray Stevens and his second for MCA Records, released in 1985. The pictures on both the front and the back of the album were taken in the Mississippi Sound near Biloxi, Mississippi according to the album credits. The cover depicts Stevens dressed as General Douglas MacArthur from World War II. "The Haircut Song" and "The Ballad of the Blue Cyclone" were released as singles from the album. "Santa Claus Is Watching You" is a re-recording of Stevens' 1960s pop single and was re-issued as a country single around the time of the album's release and was made into a popular music video.

Stevens later re-recorded "The Pirate Song" on his 1991 album #1 with a Bullet and re-recorded the song a third time in 2000 for a music video found on Funniest Video Characters.

The first track, "Thus Cacked Henrietta", is a rendition of the popular fanfare portion from Richard Strauss' "Also sprach Zarathustra", performed in chicken clucks. The rendition by Stevens lasts a little over 1 minute and was his first chicken-clucking performance since 1977's "In the Mood", released under the alias The Henhouse Five Plus Too.

== Track listing ==
Side 1
No.	Title	Writer(s)	Length
1.	"Thus Cacked Henrietta" (a/k/a Also sprach Zarathustra)	Richard Strauss (arr. Ray Stevens)	1:20
2.	"Hugo (The Human Cannonball)"	Stevens, C.W. Kalb Jr., Carlene Kalb	3:47
3.	"Vacation Bible School"	Kalb Jr., Kalb	3:28
4.	"Armchair Quarterback"	Bobby Russell	3:30
5.	"The Ballad of the Blue Cyclone, Part 1"	Glenn Sutton, Larry Cheshier	3:44
6.	"The Ballad of the Blue Cyclone, Part 2"	Sutton, Cheshier	4:25

Side 2
No.	Title	Writer(s)	Length
1.	"Kiss a Pig"	Kalb Jr., Kalb	3:05
2.	"The Haircut Song"	Mike Neun, Stevens, Kalb Jr.	6:11
3.	"The Pirate Song (I Want to Sing and Dance)"	Kalb Jr., Kalb	4:43
4.	"Punk Country Love"	Stevens, Kalb Jr., Kalb	3:36
5.	"Santa Claus Is Watching You"	Stevens	3:21

== Album credits ==
- Arranged and Produced by Ray Stevens
- Engineer – Stuart Keathley
- Recorded at Ray Stevens Studio (Nashville, Tennessee).
- Mastered by Glenn Meadows at Masterfonics (Nashville, Tennessee).
- Art Direction – Ray Stevens and Slick Lawson
- Design – Simon Levy
- Photography – Slick Lawson
- Production Manager – Susan Scott
- Landing Craft: Vincent J. Fusca, III, Captain USMC, 4th PLT (REIN) CO. A, 4th ASLT AMPH BN, USMCR, Gulfport, MS.
- Special Thanks To: Pony Maples-Weapons, Faye Sloan Costumes, George Nalley-Stevens Aviation.

Musicians

- Ray Stevens – vocals, backing vocals, keyboards, synthesizers, timpani, trumpet
- Steve Gibson – electric guitars, dobro
- Mark Casstevens – rhythm guitars, banjo
- Jack Williams – bass
- Jerry Carrigan – drums
- Jerry Kroon – drums
- Denis Solee – saxophones
- Roger Bissell – trombone
- Lisa Silver – backing vocals
- Wendy Suits – backing vocals
- Diane Tidwell – backing vocals

== Chart performance ==
=== Album ===
Chart (1985)	Peak position
U.S. Billboard Top Country Albums	1
Australia (Kent Music Report)	98

=== Singles ===
Year	Single	Peak positions
Year	Single	US Country
1985	"The Haircut Song"	45
1986	"The Ballad of the Blue Cyclone"	50
