= Crackin' Up! =

Studio album by Ray Stevens
- Released: June 1987
- Genre: Country; novelty; comedy
- Label: MCA Nashville
- Producer: Ray Stevens

Ray Stevens chronology
Get the Best of Ray Stevens (1987)	Crackin' Up! (1987)	Greatest Hits, Vol. 2 (1987)

Crackin' Up! is the twenty-fourth studio album by Ray Stevens and his fourth for MCA Records, released in 1987. Three singles were lifted from the album: "Would Jesus Wear a Rolex", "Three-Legged Man" and "Sex Symbols", the last two of which did not chart.

Chuck Donkers of AllMusic rated the album four stars out of five, saying that the songs "don't just make you laugh, they make you think, too."

== Track listing ==
No.	Title	Writer(s)	Length
1.	"Would Jesus Wear a Rolex"	Margaret Archer, Chet Atkins	2:46
2.	"Three-Legged Man"	Shel Silverstein	3:41
3.	"Cool Down Willard"	C.W. Kalb, Jr.	3:16
4.	"I'm My Own Grandpaw"	Dwight Latham, Moe Jaffe	2:41
5.	"The Ballad of Cactus Pete and Lefty"	C.W. Kalb, Jr., Ray Stevens	4:37
6.	"Sex Symbols"	C.W. Kalb, Jr.	3:51
7.	"Gourmet Restaurant"	Ray Stevens, C.W. Kalb, Jr.	3:45
8.	"The Flies of Texas Are upon You"	Layng Martine, Jr., Austin Roberts	3:34
9.	"Doctor, Doctor (Have Mercy on Me)"	C.W. Kalb, Jr.	2:54
10.	"The Day That Clancy Drowned"	Sheb Wooley	3:09

== Album credits ==
As listed in liner notes.

- Produced and Arranged by Ray Stevens
- Recorded at Ray Stevens Studio (Nashville, Tennessee).
- Engineer – Stuart Keathley
- Mastered by Glenn Meadows at Masterfonics (Nashville, Tennessee).
- Mixed and Mastered using the JVC Digital Mastering System.
- Art Direction – Ray Stevens and Slick Lawson
- Photography – Slick Lawson
- Design Concept – Ray Stevens

Musicians

- Ray Stevens – vocals, keyboards, synthesizers
- Mark Casstevens – rhythm guitars, banjo, harmonica
- Steve Gibson – electric guitars
- Stuart Keathley – bass
- Tommy Wells – drums
- Carol Chase – backing vocals
- Lisa Silver – backing vocals
- Diane Tidwell – backing vocals

== Chart performance ==
=== Album ===
Chart (1987)	Peak position
U.S. Billboard Top Country Albums	25

=== Singles ===
Year	Single	Peak positions	
Year	Single	US Country	CAN Country
1987	"Would Jesus Wear a Rolex"	41	45
