= Greatest Hits, Vol. 2 (Ray Stevens album) =

Compilation album by Ray Stevens

Compilation album by Ray Stevens
- Released: October 1987
- Genre: Pop, Country, Novelty
- Label: MCA

Ray Stevens chronology
Crackin' Up! (1987)	Greatest Hits, Vol. 2 (1987)	I Never Made a Record I Didn't Like (1988)

Greatest Hits, Vol. 2 is a collection of ten previously released singles by Ray Stevens, released in 1987. It is the second volume of the Greatest Hits package of Stevens' music that was released by MCA Records. Of the ten selections on this volume, the fifth track, "Mama's in the Sky With Elvis," makes its first album appearance. Additionally, this collection consists of five recordings for MCA Records ("Would Jesus Wear a Rolex," "Can He Love You Half as Much as I," "The Ballad of the Blue Cyclone," "Mama's in the Sky With Elvis" and "The Haircut Song"), two for Warner Bros. Records ("I Need Your Help Barry Manilow" and "In the Mood"), two for Monument Records ("Mr. Businessman" and "Freddie Feelgood (And His Funky Little Five-Piece Band)") and one for Mercury Records ("Jeremiah Peabody's Poly Unsaturated Quick Dissolving Fast Acting Pleasant Tasting Green and Purple Pills").

The version of "Freddie Feelgood (And His Funky Little Five-Piece Band)" on this collection is the album version that is overdubbed with audience noises.

== Track listing ==
No.	Title	Writer(s)	Length
1.	"Would Jesus Wear a Rolex"	Margaret Archer, Chet Atkins	2:46
2.	"Can He Love You Half as Much as I"	C.W. Kalb, Jr.	2:51
3.	"The Ballad of the Blue Cyclone"	Glenn Sutton, Larry Chesler	5:01
4.	"I Need Your Help Barry Manilow"	Dale Gonyea	3:45
5.	"Mama's in the Sky With Elvis"	Cinde Borup, Bruce Innis	3:15
6.	"Mr. Businessman"	Ray Stevens	3:22
7.	"The Haircut Song"	Mike Neun, Ray Stevens, C.W. Kalb, Jr.	6:10
8.	"Jeremiah Peabody's Poly Unsaturated Quick Dissolving Fast Acting Pleasant Tasting Green and Purple Pills"	Ray Stevens	2:23
9.	"Freddie Feelgood (And His Funky Little Five-Piece Band)"	Ray Stevens	2:49
10.	"In the Mood"	Joe Garland, Andy Razaf	2:40

== Album credits ==
Compiled from liner notes.

- "Would Jesus Wear a Rolex," "Can He Love You Half as Much as I," "The Ballad of the Blue Cyclone," "I Need Your Help Barry Manilow," "Mama's in the Sky With Elvis" and "The Haircut Song" were produced and arranged by: Ray Stevens
- "Mr. Businessman" was produced by Fred Foster and Ray Stevens and courtesy of Barnaby Records, Inc.
- "Jeremiah Peabody's Poly Unsaturated Quick Dissolving Fast Acting Pleasant Tasting Green and Purple Pills" was produced by Shelby Singleton and courtesy of Mercury Records
- "Freddie Feelgood (And His Funky Little Five-Piece Band)" was produced by Fred Foster, Ray Stevens, and Jim Malloy and courtesy of Barnaby Records, Inc.
- "In the Mood" was produced by Ray Stevens
- Mastered by Glenn Meadows at Masterfonics using the JVC Digital Audio Mastering System
- Art Direction: Simon Levy
- Photography: Slick Lawson
- Design: Barnes & Company

== Chart performance ==
Chart (1987)	Peak position
U.S. Billboard Top Country Albums	62
