= Green and Purple =

- Black and Yellow § Remakes and freestyles
- Jeremiah Peabody's Polyunsaturated Quick-Dissolving Fast-Acting Pleasant-Tasting Green and Purple Pills
- Nika riots of Constantinople, between the Blue and Green groups
- The Geometry of Shadows - Babylon 5 episode featuring riots between Purple and Green groups, in reference to the Nika riots
