= Bridget the Midget =

Bridget the Midget may refer to:

- Bridget Powers (born 1980), American erotic film actress
- "Bridget the Midget (The Queen of The Blues)", a 1971 novelty song by Ray Stevens
