= Even Stevens (album) =

Studio album by Ray Stevens
- Released: September 1968
- Studios: Bradley's Barn, Mt. Juliet, Tennessee
- Genre: Pop
- Label: Monument
- Producers: Fred Foster and Ray Stevens

Ray Stevens chronology
The Best of Ray Stevens (1968)	Even Stevens (1968)	Gitarzan (1969)

Professional ratings
Review scores
Source	Rating
Record Mirror	5/5 stars

Even Stevens is the third studio album by Ray Stevens, released in 1968. It was also his first album for Monument Records as well as his first studio album in five years, though he previously released four singles for Monument, starting with "ABC" in 1965. Before the release of this album, Stevens concentrated on writing and producing songs for other artists.

Despite the album's joking title, it is considered by all media as his first "serious" album, as there are no songs on the album that are in the genres of novelty or comedy. But Stevens never wholly strays away from humor on the album, as evidenced in the songs "The Minority", a re-recorded version of "Funny Man", "Say Cheese", "Mr. Businessman", "Unwind", and "The Great Escape" (the last two of which humorously describe the everyday routines of a working middle-class man). With the exception of the eighth track, "The Earl of Stilton Square", all the material was written by Stevens himself, though he shares credit with another songwriter for the fourth track, "Say Cheese". Stevens successfully proves his artistic versatility throughout the album, notably with touching performances of his self-penned ballads "For He's a Jolly Good Fellow" (which describes the celebration of an upcoming wedding between a man's best friend and his old flame), "Say Cheese" (which describes hiding emotional pain after a breakup), the haunting, mind-boggling "Isn't It Lonely Together", and "Face the Music". Despite not charting on the Billboard 200, the album received an overall of positive reviews from critics and fans alike.

Bobby Vinton had recorded the song "For He's a Jolly Good Fellow" for his album Bobby Vinton Sings the Newest Hits, which was released a year before this album; while "Isn't It Lonely Together" became a minor hit for former R&B singer Robert Knight during the same year of the release of this album.

The back of the album's cover contains an essay by songwriter Tupper Saussy that describes his experiences with working with Stevens and the making of the album (which was released a few months after the single "Unwind"). Saussy also mentions in the essay that he and Stevens worked on a song for the album entitled "Keep out of Reach of Children", which ended up unfinished and describes this particular song as "a song that would admonish adults to remove their sophisticated anxieties-over-nothing from their youngsters so as not to contaminate them with needless complexities."

Aside from the song "Unwind" (a Top 40 Canadian Pop hit that was issued on the album after its initial release), two singles were lifted from the album: "Mr. Businessman" (the only one to make the Top 40 on the American Pop charts) and "The Great Escape".

On October 8, 1996, Varèse Sarabande re-released this album on CD and included four bonus tracks, the last of which was the single version of Stevens' hit "Mr. Businessman".

== Track listing ==
Side One
No.	Title	Writer(s)	Length
1.	"The Minority"	Ray Stevens	3:42
2.	"Funny Man"	Ray Stevens	3:01
3.	"For He's a Jolly Good Fellow"	Ray Stevens	2:47
4.	"Say Cheese"	Bob Tubert, Ray Stevens	2:29
5.	"Mr. Businessman"	Ray Stevens	3:19

Side Two
No.	Title	Writer(s)	Length
1.	"Isn't It Lonely Together"	Ray Stevens	3:14
2.	"Face the Music"	Ray Stevens	2:25
3.	"The Earl of Stilton Square"	Tupper Saussy	3:57
4.	"Unwind"	Ray Stevens	3:10
5.	"The Great Escape"	Ray Stevens	3:03

CD bonus tracks

- "Party People" - (Joe South)
- "Devil May Care" - (Joe South)
- "Answer Me, My Love" - (Fred Rauch, Carl Sigman, Gerard Winkler)
- "Mr. Businessman" (single version) - (Ray Stevens)

== Album credits ==
- Produced by: Fred Foster and Ray Stevens
- Engineer: Charlie Tallent
- Production and engineer assistance: Jim Malloy
- Recorded at Bradley's Barn
- Photography and art direction: Ken Kim
- "The Earl of Stilton Square" was written, arranged and conducted by: Tupper Saussy
- "Face the Music" was arranged and conducted by: Louis Nunley
- All other songs were written, arranged and conducted by: Ray Stevens

== Charts ==
Singles - Billboard (North America)

Year	Single	Chart	Position
1968	"Unwind"	Billboard Hot 100	52
1968	"Unwind"	Canadian Singles Chart	29
1968	"Mr. Businessman"	Billboard Hot 100	28
1968	"Mr. Businessman"	Canadian Singles Chart	7
1968	"The Great Escape"	Bubbling Under Hot 100 Singles	114
1968	"The Great Escape"	Canadian Singles Chart	43
