= I Never Made a Record I Didn't Like =

Ray Stevens' 1988 album featuring hit singles

Studio album by Ray Stevens
- Released: June 1988
- Genre: Country, novelty
- Label: MCA
- Producer: Ray Stevens

Ray Stevens chronology
Greatest Hits, Vol. 2 (1987)	I Never Made a Record I Didn't Like (1988)	Beside Myself (1989)

I Never Made a Record I Didn't Like is Ray Stevens' twenty-fifth studio album and his fifth release under MCA Records, issued in 1988. The album includes two singles: "Surfin' U.S.S.R." and "The Day I Tried to Teach Charlene Mackenzie How to Drive."

The single "Surfin' U.S.S.R." was accompanied by Stevens' second music video. The song humorously combines the iconic sound of the Beach Boys with themes related to the real-world events of the Soviet Union. The second single, "The Day I Tried to Teach Charlene Mackenzie How to Drive," narrates a comedic attempt to teach a deaf woman how to drive. This character, Charlene Mackenzie, later became significant in Stevens' direct-to-video movie, Get Serious!, where she was portrayed by Connie Freeman.

The album cover depicts Stevens dressed as Will Rogers, performing a rope trick. The title is a playful nod to Rogers' famous quote, "I never met a man I didn't like."

The album’s third track, "Mama's in the Sky With Elvis," previously appeared on the second volume of Stevens' Greatest Hits compilation, marking its first inclusion in a studio album.

== Track listing ==
No.	Title	Writer(s)	Length
1.	"Surfin' U.S.S.R."	William Martin	3:04
2.	"The Booger Man"	Stevens, C.W. Kalb, Jr.	4:34
3.	"Mama's in the Sky With Elvis"	Cinde Borup, Bruce Innes	3:15
4.	"Language, Nudity, Violence & Sex"	Kalb	3:19
5.	"Bad"	Michael Jackson	3:41
6.	"The Day I Tried to Teach Charlene Mackenzie How to Drive"	Kalb	3:49
7.	"Blood and Suede"	Martin	2:59
8.	"Ethelene (The Truckstop Queen)"	Kalb	2:39
9.	"I Don't Need None of That"	Kalb	3:12
10.	"Old Hippie Class Reunion"	Stevens, Kalb	5:16

== Album credits ==
Compiled from liner notes.

- Produced and Arranged by Ray Stevens
- Recorded at Ray Stevens Studio (Nashville, Tennessee).
- Engineer – Stuart Keathley
- Mastered by Glenn Meadows at Masterfonics (Nashville, Tennessee).
- Mastered using the JVC Digital Mastering System.
- Art Direction – Ray Stevens and Slick Lawson
- Design – Barnes & Company
- Photography – Slick Lawson
- Wardrobe and Styling – Susan Lawson
- Stage Manager – Bubba Crigler

Musicians

- Ray Stevens – vocals, synthesizers
- Gary Prim – keyboards
- Mark Casstevens – rhythm guitars, banjo
- Steve Gibson – electric guitars, dobro, mandolin
- Larry Sasser – steel guitar, dobro
- Stuart Keathley – bass
- Tommy Wells – drums
- Terry McMillan – harmonica
- Lisa Silver – fiddle, backing vocals
- Sheri Huffman – backing vocals
- Wendy Suits – backing vocals
- Diane Vanette – backing vocals

== Chart performance ==
=== Album ===
Chart (1987)	Peak position
U.S. Billboard Top Country Albums	52

=== Singles ===
Year	Single	Peak positions
Year	Single	US Country
1988	"The Day I Tried to Teach Charlene Mackenzie How to Drive"	88
