= Beside Myself (Ray Stevens album) =

Studio album by Ray Stevens
- Released: 1989
- Genre: Country
- Length: 32:41
- Label: MCA
- Producer: Ray Stevens

Ray Stevens chronology
I Never Made a Record I Didn't Like (1988)	Beside Myself (1989)	Funny Man (1989)

Beside Myself is the twenty-sixth studio album by Ray Stevens and his sixth for MCA Records, released in 1989. It includes the singles "I Saw Elvis in a UFO" and "There's a Star Spangled Banner". The album was also his last for MCA Records before he moved to Curb Records for his next studio album, 1990's Lend Me Your Ears.

A repackaged version of this album, Ray Stevens – At His Best (MCAC-20695 cassette, MCAD-20695 CD), was released on December 18, 1992, with most of the same tracks in a different order, eliminating the tracks "Bad Dancin'" and "I Used to Be Crazy". A different version of At His Best, with all ten tracks from Beside Myself in the original order, is available on iTunes.

== Track listing ==
1. "Your Bozo’s Back Again" – 3:51
2. "Another Fine Mess" – 3:19
3. "Marion Michael Morrison" – 3:53
4. "Butterfly Inside a Coupe de Ville" – 3:12
5. "There’s a Star Spangled Banner" – 3:38
6. "I Saw Elvis in a U.F.O." – 3:34
7. "The Woogie Boogie" – 2:23
8. "Stuck on You" – 3:18
9. "Bad Dancin'" – 2:48
10. "I Used to Be Crazy" – 2:45

All songs written by Ray Stevens and C.W. Kalb, Jr. except "Marion Michael Morrison" written by C.W. Kalb, Jr. and "Bad Dancin'", written by Ray Stevens, C.W. Kalb, Jr., Cinde Borup and Bruce Innis.

== Personnel ==
Compiled from liner notes.

Musicians

- Ray Stevens – lead vocals, backing vocals, synthesizers
- Gary Prim – keyboards
- Mark Casstevens – rhythm guitars
- Steve Gibson – electric guitars
- Stuart Keathley – bass guitar
- Tommy Wells – drums
- Terry McMillan – harmonica
- Denis Solee – tenor saxophone
- Vicki Hampton – backing vocals
- Sheri Huffman – backing vocals
- Lisa Silver – backing vocals
- Diane Vanette – backing vocals

Production

- Ray Stevens – producer, arrangements, art direction
- Stuart Keathley – engineer
- Glenn Meadows – mastering
- Slick Lawson – art direction, photography
- Susan Lawson – styling, make-up
- Recorded at Ray Stevens Studio (Nashville, Tennessee).
- Mastered at Masterfonics (Nashville, Tennessee).

== Chart performance ==
Chart (1989)	Peak position
U.S. Billboard Top Country Albums	51

== See also ==
- Ray Stevens discography
