= Turn Your Radio On (album) =

Studio album by Ray Stevens
- Released: January 1972
- Genres: Pop; gospel; country
- Label: Barnaby
- Producer: Ray Stevens

Ray Stevens chronology
Ray Stevens' Greatest Hits (1971)	Turn Your Radio On (1972)	Losin' Streak (1973)

Turn Your Radio On is Ray Stevens' eighth studio album and his third for Barnaby Records, released in 1972. The title comes from a gospel song written by Albert E. Brumley. Unlike Stevens' previous album releases, this album shows Stevens' spiritual side and was his first album of gospel music. The fourth track, "Let Your Love Be a Light unto the People", was written by Stevens' brother, John Ragsdale. The sixth track, "Have a Little Talk with Myself", was taken from Stevens' album of the same name. The album includes four singles, three of which were issued before the album's release: "A Mama and a Papa", the traditional gospel song "All My Trials", the title track, and "Love Lifted Me".

The album was reissued by CBS Records in 1982. On November 15, 2005, Collectables Records re-released the album and his 1975 album, Misty, together on one CD.

== Track listing ==
Side 1
No.	Title	Writer(s)	Length
1.	"Turn Your Radio On"	Albert E. Brumley	2:09
2.	"Love Lifted Me"	James Rowe, Howard E. Smith	3:09
3.	"Yes, Jesus Loves Me"	Ray Stevens	2:33
4.	"Let Your Love Be a Light unto the People"	John Ragsdale	2:35
5.	"A Mama and a Papa"	Tom Autry	2:49
6.	"Have a Little Talk with Myself"	Ray Stevens	3:05

Side 2
No.	Title	Writer(s)	Length
1.	"All My Trials"	arranged by Ray Stevens	4:34
2.	"I'll Fly Away"	Albert E. Brumley	3:25
3.	"Why Don't You Lead Me to That Rock"	Ray Stevens	2:39
4.	"Glory Special"	Mrs. J.W. Payte	3:30
5.	"Oh! Will There Be Any Stars"	Ray Stevens	3:41

== Album credits ==
- Choral backing for "Love Lifted Me": B.C. & M. Mass Choir
- All other vocal backing: Ray Stevens
- Arranged and produced by: Ray Stevens for Ahab Productions, Inc.
- Engineer: Charlie Tallent
- Design: Rod Dyer
- Cover photo: John Donegan

== Charts ==
Album - Billboard (North America)

Year	Chart	Peak position
1972	The Billboard 200	175
1972	Billboard Top Country Albums	14

Singles - Billboard (North America)

Year	Single	Chart	Peak position
1971	"A Mama and a Papa"	Billboard Adult Contemporary	4
1971	"A Mama and a Papa"	Canadian RPM Adult Contemporary Tracks	6
1971	"A Mama and a Papa"	Canadian RPM Top Singles	72
1971	"A Mama and a Papa"	Billboard Hot 100	82
1971	"All My Trials"	Billboard Adult Contemporary	6
1971	"All My Trials"	Billboard Hot 100	70
1971	"All My Trials"	Canadian RPM Top Singles	82
1971	"Turn Your Radio On"	Canadian RPM Adult Contemporary Tracks	3
1971	"Turn Your Radio On"	Canadian RPM Country Tracks	10
1971	"Turn Your Radio On"	New Zealand (Listener)	20
1971	"Turn Your Radio On"	UK Singles Chart	33
1971	"Turn Your Radio On"	Billboard Hot 100	63
1971	"Turn Your Radio On"	Billboard Hot Country Singles	17
1971	"Turn Your Radio On"	Billboard Adult Contemporary	24
