= Misty (Ray Stevens album) =

Studio album by Ray Stevens
- Released: April 1975
- Genre: Pop; country
- Label: Barnaby
- Producer: Ray Stevens

Ray Stevens chronology
Boogity Boogity (1974)	Misty (1975)	The Very Best of Ray Stevens (1975)

Misty is the twelfth studio album by Ray Stevens as well as being his seventh and final for Barnaby Records. It was released in 1975. This album contains primarily cover versions of various songs that were popular from the 1920s to the 1950s, though there are two original songs for the album as well ("Sunshine" and "Take Care of Business"). Four singles were lifted from the album: the title track, "Indian Love Call", "Young Love", and "Lady of Spain".

On November 15, 2005, Collectables Records re-released this album and his 1972 album Turn Your Radio On together on one CD.

== Track listing ==
Side A
No.	Title	Writer(s)	Length
1.	"Misty"	Erroll Garner, Johnny Burke	2:53
2.	"Indian Love Call"	Rudolph Friml, Otto Harbach, Oscar Hammerstein II	3:26
3.	"Over the Rainbow"	Harold Arlen, E.Y. Harburg	3:08
4.	"Oh, Lonesome Me"	Don Gibson	2:58
5.	"Sunshine"	Ray Stevens	2:45
6.	"Cow-Cow Boogie"	Don Raye, Gene DePaul, Benny Carter	2:27

Side B
No.	Title	Writer(s)	Length
1.	"Young Love"	Carole Joyner, Ric Cartey	3:48
2.	"Deep Purple"	Mitchell Parish, Peter DeRose	3:12
3.	"Mockingbird Hill"	Vaughn Horton	3:21
4.	"Take Care of Business"	Layng Martine Jr.	4:00
5.	"Lady of Spain"	Robert Hargreaves, Tolchard Evans, Stanley Damerell, Henry B. Tilsley	2:40

== Album credits ==
Musicians

- Keyboards: Ray Stevens (piano, organ, clarinet, ARP synthesizer, vibes, bells, etc.)
- Bass: Jack Williams (except for "Misty" and "Sunshine" and "Indian Love Call")
- Bass for "Misty" and "Sunshine": Stuart Keathley
- Bass for "Indian Love Call": Norbert Putnam
- Drums: Jerry Carrigan (except for "Misty" and "Sunshine" and "Indian Love Call")
- Drums for "Misty and "Sunshine": Jerry Kroon
- Drums for "Indian Love Call": Kenneth Buttrey
- Rhythm guitar: Johnny Christopher (except for "Misty" and "Sunshine")
- Rhythm guitar for "Misty" and "Sunshine": Mark Casstevens
- Banjo for "Misty" and "Sunshine": Mark Casstevens
- Banjo for "Deep Purple": Bobby Thompson
- Fiddle: Lisa Silver
- Steel: Hal Rugg (except for "Misty" and "Sunshine")
- Steel for "Misty" and "Sunshine": Jay Dee Maness
- Saxophone: Norman Ray
- Backup voices: Ray Stevens, Toni Wine, Lisa Silver
- Engineer: Tom Knox
- Arranged and produced by: Ray Stevens for Ahab Productions, Inc.
- Art director: Neil Terk
- Photography: Keats Tyler
- Production supervisor: Bob Scerbo

== Charts ==
Chart (1975)	Peak position
Australia (Kent Music Report)	37
The Billboard 200	106
Billboard Top Country Albums	3

Singles - Billboard (North America)

Year	Single	Chart	Position
1975	"Misty"	UK Singles Chart	2
1975	"Misty"	Canadian RPM Country Tracks	2
1975	"Misty"	Billboard Hot Country Singles & Tracks	3
1975	"Misty"	Canadian RPM Adult Contemporary Tracks	6
1975	"Misty"	Billboard Adult Contemporary	8
1975	"Misty"	Billboard Hot 100	14
1975	"Misty"	Canadian RPM Top Singles	15
1975	"Indian Love Call"	UK Singles Chart	34
1975	"Indian Love Call"	Billboard Hot Country Singles & Tracks	38
1975	"Indian Love Call"	Billboard Hot 100	68
1976	"Young Love"	Billboard Adult Contemporary	44
1976	"Young Love"	Canadian RPM Country Tracks	47
1976	"Young Love"	Billboard Hot Country Singles & Tracks	48
1976	"Young Love"	Billboard Hot 100	93
