= Everything Is Beautiful (Ray Stevens album) =

Studio album by Ray Stevens
- Released: May 1970
- Studio: Jack Clement Recording (Nashville, Tennessee)
- Genre: Pop
- Label: Barnaby
- Producer: Ray Stevens

Ray Stevens chronology
Have a Little Talk With Myself (1969)	Everything Is Beautiful (1970)	Unreal!!! (1970)

Everything Is Beautiful is the sixth studio album by Ray Stevens, released in 1970, as well as his first for Barnaby Records. After making regular appearances on The Andy Williams Show during the show's eleventh season, Stevens left Monument Records in early 1970 and signed with Barnaby (which was owned by Williams). The album was rush-released to capitalize on the success of the single of the same name, which was the album's sole single. Cover versions include "Get Together", "Raindrops Keep Fallin' on My Head", John Denver's hit "Leaving on a Jet Plane", "A Time for Us", Bob Dylan's song "She Belongs to Me", and two of the Beatles' songs ("She Came in Through the Bathroom Window" and "Something").

The back of the album cover contains a photo of Stevens and Andy Williams.

On May 17, 2005, Collectables Records re-released this album and Stevens' next album Ray Stevens...Unreal!!! together on one CD.

== Track listing ==
Side 1
No.	Title	Writer(s)	Length
1.	"Everything Is Beautiful"	Ray Stevens	3:29
2.	"Get Together"	Chet Powers	3:49
3.	"Walk a Mile in My Shoes"	Joe South	3:42
4.	"Raindrops Keep Fallin' on My Head" (From the 20th Century-Fox Picture "Butch Cassidy and the Sundance Kid")	Burt Bacharach, Hal David	2:55
5.	"Leaving on a Jet Plane"	John Denver	3:51

Side 2
No.	Title	Writer(s)	Length
1.	"Love Theme from "Romeo and Juliet" (A Time for Us)"	Larry Kusik, Eddie Snyder, Nino Rota	3:51
2.	"She Belongs to Me"	Bob Dylan	2:58
3.	"Early in the Morning"	Leon Carr, Paul Vance	2:51
4.	"A Brighter Day"	Ray Stevens	3:12
5.	"She Came in Through the Bathroom Window"	John Lennon, Paul McCartney	3:01
6.	"Something"	George Harrison	3:10

== Album credits ==
- Arranged and produced by Ray Stevens for Ahab Productions, Inc.

Personnel

- Piano: Ray Stevens
- Bass: Norbert Putnam
- Drums: Jerry Carrigan
- Guitars: Jerry Kennedy, Harold Bradley, Chip Young
- Percussion: Farrell Morris
- Strings: Brenton Banks, Byron Back, George Binkley, Lillian Vann Hunt, Marvin Chantry, Martin Katahn, Sheldon Kurland, Bruce Waterman, Stefanie Woolf, Rex Peer, David Vanderkooi, Gary Van Osdale
- Steel Guitar: Weldon Myrick
- Trumpets: Patrick McGuffey, George Tidwell, Don Sheffield, Glenn Baxter
- Trombones: Dennis Good, Gene Mullins
- Saxophones: Billy Puett, Norman Ray
- "Everything Is Beautiful," performed with the B.C.&M. Choir of Nashville through the Courtesy of Nashboro Records
- Studio: Jack Clement Recording Studio - Nashville
- Background voices and special effects instruments: Ray Stevens
- Special thanks to: Mrs. Eichler's 2nd grade class for the introduction to "Everything Is Beautiful"
- Front cover photo: Del Hayden
- Back cover photo: Keats Tyler

== Charts ==
Year	Chart	Position
1970	US Billboard Top LPs	35
1970	Canadian Albums Chart	28

Singles

Year	Single	Chart	Position
1970	"Everything Is Beautiful"	US Hot 100	1
1970	"Everything Is Beautiful"	US Easy Listening	1
1970	"Everything Is Beautiful"	Canadian Singles Chart	1
1970	"Everything Is Beautiful"	Australian Singles Chart	1
1970	"Everything Is Beautiful"	Irish Singles Chart	3
1970	"Everything Is Beautiful"	UK Singles Chart	6
1970	"Everything Is Beautiful"	MegaCharts	12
1970	"Everything Is Beautiful"	Hot Country Singles	39
