= 1,837 Seconds of Humor =

Studio album by Ray Stevens
- Released: July 1962
- Genre: Pop, novelty, comedy
- Length: 30:37
- Label: Mercury
- Producer: Shelby Singleton

Ray Stevens chronology
1,837 Seconds of Humor (1962)	Ray "Ahab the Arab" Stevens and Hal Winters (1963)

1,837 Seconds of Humor is the debut album of Ray Stevens, released in 1962. The front of the album shows a sheik that rides a camel, which is a reference to Stevens' song "Ahab the Arab." All of the material on the album was written by Ray Stevens and published by Lowery Music Co., Inc. (BMI). The back of the album cover contains an essay of biographical information of Stevens from his youth in his hometown of Clarkdale, Georgia to the time of this album's release and gives brief descriptions of all the songs on the album. Four singles were lifted from the album: "Jeremiah Peabody's Poly Unsaturated Quick Dissolving Fast Acting Pleasant Tasting Green and Purple Pills" (his first Top 40 hit), "Scratch My Back (I Love It)" (which failed to chart), "Ahab the Arab" (his major breakthrough hit and his biggest until his 1970 hit "Everything Is Beautiful"), and "Further More."

In 1971, the album was reissued by Pickwick Records under the title Rock & Roll Show, with a truncated and resequenced track listing, omitting the songs "The Rockin' Boppin' Waltz" and "Further More." The album cover contains two faces of Stevens making a huge smile, one on the top left and the other on the top right; the center of the front album shows a sketch of Stevens making the exact smile along with references to a few of the songs on the album. The back cover contains the same liner notes as the original album.

== Track listing ==
All songs written by Ray Stevens.

Side 1
No.	Title	Length
1.	"Ahab the Arab"	3:45
2.	"Saturday Night at the Movies"	2:42
3.	"Popeye and Olive Oil"	3:05
4.	"The Rockin' Boppin' Waltz"	1:35
5.	"PFC Rhythm and Blues Jones"	2:08
6.	"Scratch My Back (I Love It)"	2:04

Side 2
No.	Title	Length
1.	"The Rock and Roll Show"	4:22
2.	"Julius Played the Trumpet"	2:35
3.	"Jeremiah Peabody's Poly Unsaturated Quick Dissolving Fast Acting Pleasant Tasting Green and Purple Pills"	2:22
4.	"Further More"	2:19
5.	"A Hermit Named Dave"	3:40

== Track listing for Rock & Roll Show ==
Side 1
No.	Title	Length
1.	"The Rock and Roll Show"	4:22
2.	"Saturday Night at the Movies"	2:42
3.	"Popeye and Olive Oil"	3:05
4.	"PFC Rhythm and Blues Jones"	2:08
5.	"Scratch My Back (I Love It)"	2:04

Side 2
No.	Title	Length
1.	"Ahab the Arab"	3:45
2.	"Julius Played the Trumpet"	2:35
3.	"Jeremiah Peabody's Poly Unsaturated Quick Dissolving Fast Acting Pleasant Tasting Green and Purple Pills"	2:22
4.	"A Hermit Named Dave"	3:40

== Personnel ==
- Background vocals: the Merry Melody Singers
- Orchestra conducted by: Jerry Kennedy

MG 20732 (Mono LP) MG 60732 (Stereo LP)

== Charts ==
Album – Billboard (North America)

Year	Chart	Position
1962	Billboard 200	135

Singles – Billboard (North America)

Year	Single	Chart	Position
1961	"Jeremiah Peabody's Poly Unsaturated Quick Dissolving Fast Acting Pleasant Tasting Green and Purple Pills"	Billboard Hot 100	35
1962	"Ahab the Arab"	Billboard Hot 100	5
1962	"Ahab the Arab"	Billboard R&B Singles	9
1962	"Further More"	Billboard Hot 100	91
