= Shriner's Convention (album) =

Studio album by Ray Stevens
- Released: February 1980
- Genres: Pop, country, novelty, comedy
- Label: RCA Victor
- Producer: Ray Stevens

Ray Stevens chronology
The Best of Ray Stevens (1979)	Shriner's Convention (1980)	Wild and Crazy (1980)

Professional ratings
Review scores
Source	Rating
The Encyclopedia of Popular Music	3/5 stars

Shriner's Convention is a studio album by the American musician Ray Stevens, released in 1980, his first for RCA Records. The front of the album's cover shows a drawn picture of Stevens on a motorcycle with a young, curvaceous woman in back of him. Stevens wears a blue, Hawaiian-styled shirt and blue jeans, while the woman wears a bikini, and the two wear shriner hats. In the background of the picture, there is a shriner's parade on the streets. On the back of the album, there is a comic strip of happenings at a motel while the parade occurs.

The title track is the album's sole single.

== Track listing ==
Side A
No.	Title	Writer(s)	Length
1.	"Shriner's Convention"	Ray Stevens	5:33
2.	"The Last Laugh"	Burke, Black, Gillespie	2:36
3.	"Rita's Letter"	Sharp	3:30
4.	"The Watch Song"	Mike Neun	3:28

Side B
No.	Title	Writer(s)	Length
1.	"The Dooright Family"	Ray Stevens	5:05
2.	"Hey There"	Richard Adler, Jerry Ross	2:37
3.	"Put It in Your Ear"	Layng Martine, Jr.	2:42
4.	"You're Never Goin' to Tampa with Me"	C.W. Kalb, Jr.	2:50
5.	"Coin Machine"	Dick Feller	3:12

In the cassette version of the album, the tracks for "Last Laugh" and "Coin Machine" are reversed.

== Album credits ==
- Arranged and produced by: Ray Stevens at Ray Stevens Studio, Nashville, Tennessee
- Engineer: Stuart Keathley
- Cover concept: Jerry Bradley
- Art direction and cartoon illustration: Herb Burnette
- Lettering: Bill Noss
- Graphics by: Pinwheel Studios, Nashville

== Charts ==
=== Weekly charts ===
Chart (1980)	Peak position
US Billboard 200	132
US Top Country Albums (Billboard)	4

=== Year-end charts ===
Chart (1980)	Position
US Top Country Albums (Billboard)	46

=== Singles ===
Year	Single	Peak chart positions		
Year	Single	US Country	US	CAN Country
1980	"Shriner's Convention"	7	101	2
