= The Ivy Three =

American pop vocal trio formed at New York University in 1959

- Origin: Garden City, New York, U.S.
- Genres: Pop
- Years active: 1959–1961
- Label: Shell Records
- Past members: Charles Koppelman; Don Rubin

The Ivy Three were an American pop vocal trio from Garden City, Long Island, New York.

The group was formed by three undergraduates at Adelphi University in 1959. They signed to Shell Records; their first single, "Yogi", was written by Shell founders Lou Stallman and Sid Jacobson along with member Charles Koppelman. The song became a hit in America, peaking at #22 on the Black Singles chart and #8 on the Billboard Hot 100 in 1960. It was the group's only hit, and they disbanded by 1961. Koppelman and Rubin later became successful managers in the music industry.

== Members ==
- Artie Kaye (Artie Berkowitz)
- Charlie Cane (Charles Koppelman)
- Don Rubin
