= Number 1 with a Bullet =

1. 1 With a Bullet

Studio album by Ray Stevens
- Released: June 18, 1991
- Genre: Country, novelty
- Length: 32:31
- Label: Capitol/Curb
- Producer: Ray Stevens

Ray Stevens chronology
Greatest Hits (1991)	#1 With a Bullet (1991)	Ahab the Arab (1992)

#1 with a Bullet is the twenty-eighth studio album of American country and comedy singer Ray Stevens. It was released in June 1991. The album includes the singles "Working for the Japanese" and "Power Tools", which respectively reached numbers 62 and 72 on the Hot Country Songs charts. The album also includes a re-recording of "The Pirate Song," which was originally recorded for his 1986 album I Have Returned.

== Critical reception ==
Dennis Miller of the Elmira, New York Star-Gazette gave the album a mostly positive review, writing that "Stevens is at his madcap best when he aims his satirical bullets at the contemporary." He considered "Teenage Mutant Kung Fu Chickens", "Workin' for the Japanese", and "You Gotta Have a Hat" among the best in this regard. He also thought that "The Pirate Song" was the best due to Stevens' portrayal of the two characters in the song. Giving it 3 out of 4 stars, Jack Hurst of Tribune Media called the album "just another Stevens album, meaning that its varied and imaginative music backs the occasional lame line along with lots of others that are howlingly funny."

== Track listing ==
No.	Title	Writer(s)	Length
1.	"Power Tools"	C.W. Kalb, Jr.	3:29
2.	"Teenage Mutant Kung Fu Chickens"	C.W. Kalb, Jr.	3:20
3.	"You Gotta Have a Hat"	C.W. Kalb, Jr.	2:46
4.	"Tabloid News"	C.W. Kalb, Jr.	2:40
5.	"The Pirate Song (I Want to Sing & Dance)"	C.W. Kalb, Jr., Carlene Kalb	3:59
6.	"The Sheik of R&B"	C.W. Kalb, Jr., Russell Piburn, Bill Piburn	2:49
7.	"Juanita and the Kids"	C.W. Kalb, Jr., Lonnie Carneal	4:39
8.	"Back in the Doghouse Again"	C.W. Kalb, Jr., Glen Fortner	3:06
9.	"A Little Blue-Haired Lady"	C.W. Kalb, Jr.	2:43
10.	"Working for the Japanese"	Ron DeLacy	2:56

== Personnel ==
Compiled from liner notes.

Musicians

- Ray Stevens – vocals, acoustic piano, synthesizers
- Gary Prim – keyboards
- Mark Casstevens – acoustic guitars, banjo, mandolin
- Steve Gibson – electric guitars, bass guitar
- Stuart Keathley – bass guitar
- Tommy Wells – drums
- Wendy Johnson – backing vocals
- Jana King – backing vocals
- Lisa Silver – backing vocals

Production

- Ray Stevens – producer, arrangements
- Stuart Keathley – recording engineer
- Glenn Meadows – mastering
- Simon Levy – design
- Slick Lawson – photography
- Recorded at Ray Stevens Studio (Nashville, Tennessee).
- Mastered at Masterfonics (Nashville, Tennessee).

== Chart performance ==
=== Album ===
Chart (1991)	Peak position
U.S. Billboard Top Comedy Albums	14
U.S. Billboard Top Country Albums	60

=== Singles ===
Year	Single	Peak positions
Year	Single	US Country
1991	"Working for the Japanese"	62
1991	"Power Tools"	72
