= Mississippi Squirrel Revival =

Single by Ray Stevens

from the album He Thinks He's Ray Stevens
- B-side: "Ned Nostril"
- Released: December 1984
- Genre: Country, novelty
- Length: 3:45
- Label: MCA
- Songwriter(s): Cyrus "Buddy" Kalb, Carlene Kalb
- Producer(s): Ray Stevens

Ray Stevens singles chronology
"I'm Kissin' You Goodbye" (1984)	"Mississippi Squirrel Revival" (1984)	"It's Me Again, Margaret" (1985)

"Mississippi Squirrel Revival" is a song by American country music singer Ray Stevens. It is a single from his 1984 album He Thinks He's Ray Stevens.

== Content ==
A young boy visiting relatives in Pascagoula, Mississippi catches a wild squirrel, which he sneaks into the First Self-Righteous Church during a Sunday service. When the squirrel escapes his box, it heads into the overalls of one of the other parishioners, who jumps in shock and discomfort (thinking "he had a Weed Eater loose in his Fruit of the Looms"). The rest of the congregation believe he has been possessed, either by a demon or by the Holy Spirit; it is implied that the pastor is inclined to believe it is the latter. In the front pew, "Sister Bertha Better-than-You," a holier-than-thou parishioner who had been watching the previous incident "with sadistic glee," panics when the squirrel suddenly runs into her dress. In terror, she breaks down in tears and begins to confess all of her sins, including "naming names" of paramours that bring embarrassment to the whole church. Following the ordeal, the church experiences a sudden renewal-revival and a wave of baptisms, rededications, increased tithes, and volunteers to go on foreign missions. The now-adult singer reflects on the incident as an example of one of God's miracles.

== History ==
Originally, "Mississippi Squirrel Revival" was not intended to be a single, but it was rush-released when various radio stations began playing it. Stevens felt that its release would help re-establish him as a novelty artist after several albums mostly composed of serious material. Stevens felt that novelty music was experiencing a revival in the middle 1980s after a period in the early 1980s where it was not as popular.

As with many other Stevens songs, a music video was produced several years later, with the songwriters in prominent roles; Cyrus "Buddy" Kalb played the squirrel's first target.

== Chart performance ==
Chart (1984–85)	Peak position
U.S. Billboard Hot Country Singles	20
Canadian RPM Country Tracks	32
