= Gitarzan (album) =

Studio album by Ray Stevens
- Released: May 1969
- Genres: Pop; novelty; comedy
- Label: Monument
- Producers: Fred Foster, Ray Stevens, Jim Malloy

Ray Stevens chronology
Even Stevens (1968)	Gitarzan (1969)	Have a Little Talk With Myself (1969)

Gitarzan is the fourth studio album by Ray Stevens, released in 1969, as well as his second for Monument Records. Unlike his previous album, Even Stevens, this album is completely in the genres of novelty and comedy. Although this is a true studio album, all of the songs are overdubbed with cheering and applauding of an audience to provide the feeling of a live album. Contents include three of the Coasters' hits ("Yakety Yak", "Little Egypt" and "Along Came Jones"), "Mr. Custer", and "Alley Oop". The album also contains re-recordings of his two novelty hits, "Harry the Hairy Ape" and "Ahab the Arab". "Freddie Feelgood (And His Funky Little Five Piece Band)" makes its first appearance on an album but is overdubbed with audience noises for this album.

The back of the album cover contains an essay that was written by Merv Griffin and describes Stevens' musical styles. Included in the essay is an anecdote about Stevens' appearance on The Merv Griffin Show while promoting his hit "Unwind". Griffin also mentions that he and Arthur Treacher are featured in a performance of the song "Gitarzan" as the voices of Jane and Cheetah "(in the order of your choice)" during a visit from Stevens on Griffin's talk-show. In the official recording, though, Stevens does the vocals for all the characters.

Aside from "Freddie Feelgood", two singles were lifted from this album: the title track (which tells a bizarre story about Tarzan and Jane and Cheetah forming a music band) and "Along Came Jones". The album version of the former begins with cheers and applause from an audience while the single version does not.

On July 2, 1996, Varèse Sarabande rereleased this album on CD and included three bonus tracks, all three of which were singles after the release of this album: "The Streak", "The Moonlight Special", and "Bridget the Midget (The Queen of the Blues)".

== Track listing ==
Side 1
No.	Title	Writer(s)	Length
1.	"Yakety Yak"	Jerry Leiber, Mike Stoller	2:37
2.	"Little Egypt"	Jerry Leiber, Mike Stoller	3:23
3.	"Mr. Custer"	Fred Darian, Al DeLory, Joseph VanWinkle	3:23
4.	"Freddie Feelgood (And His Funky Little Five Piece Band)"	Ray Stevens	2:42
5.	"Sir Thanks-a-Lot"	Ray Stevens	3:02
6.	"Gitarzan"	Ray Stevens, Bill Justis	2:59

Side 2
No.	Title	Writer(s)	Length
1.	"Along Came Jones"	Jerry Leiber, Mike Stoller	3:37
2.	"Alley Oop"	Dallas Frazier	3:13
3.	"Harry the Hairy Ape"	Ray Stevens	3:09
4.	"Bagpipes - That's My Bag"	Ray Stevens	2:56
5.	"Ahab the Arab"	Ray Stevens	3:37

CD bonus tracks

- "The Streak" - (Ray Stevens)
- "The Moonlight Special" - (Ray Stevens)
- "Bridget the Midget (The Queen of the Blues)" - (Ray Stevens)

== Personnel ==
- Produced by: Fred Foster, Ray Stevens, Jim Malloy
- Arranger: Ray Stevens
- Jerry Carrigan - drums
- Norbert Putnam - bass
- Dick Kent - announcer
- Jim Malloy, Charlie Tallent - engineer
- Bill Forshee - photography
- Ken Kim - art direction

== Charts ==
Album - Billboard (North America)

Year	Chart	Position
1969	The Billboard 200	57

Singles - Billboard (North America)

Year	Single	Chart	Position
1966	"Freddie Feelgood (And His Funky Little Five Piece Band)"	Billboard Hot 100	91
1969	"Gitarzan"	Billboard Hot 100	8
1969	"Gitarzan"	Canadian Singles Chart	10
1969	"Along Came Jones"	Billboard Hot 100	27
1969	"Along Came Jones"	Canadian Singles Chart	28
