= Cyrus "Buddy" Kalb =

American singer-songwriter and musician (born 1938)

Cyrus "Buddy" Kalb Jr. (born July 15, 1938) is an American singer-songwriter and musician. He is best known for hits such as "Mississippi Squirrel Revival", performed by Ray Stevens, and "Frog Kissin'", which was performed by numerous artists, including Chet Atkins.

Kalb's songwriting career is connected almost exclusively to Ray Stevens in that the two of them are often co-writers as well as acting partners in Stevens' long string of music videos. Kalb plays the straight man in almost any situation but often comes off as the comic foil when Stevens plays it serious. Kalb can be seen playing the part of Harve Newlin in the "Mississippi Squirrel Revival" music video, a donut-eating policeman in the "It's Me Again, Margaret" music video, the music video director in "The Streak" music video, a drag queen in the "Surfin' USSR" music video, the head of Mission Control in the "Virgil and the Moonshot" music video, and the vibraphone player in the "Juanita and the Kids" music video. Kalb also portrays the character of Dudley Dorite in the "Dudley Dorite of the Highway Patrol" music video and the direct-to-video movie, Get Serious!. In the much anticipated music video for "The Blue Cyclone", Kalb plays the part of the title role.

Kalb currently appears alongside Stevens in the web-exclusive sitcom, We Ain't Dead Yet, which stars Stevens as a resident of a retirement home. Kalb has supplied Ray Stevens with numerous songs over the last 25 years, often at times being the main writer on various albums Stevens released in the early '90s. One album in particular, #1 With a Bullet, issued in 1991, featured ten songs and all but one was written/co-written by Kalb.
