= Would Jesus Wear a Rolex =

Single by Ray Stevens

from the album Crackin' Up!
- B-side: "Cool Down Willard"
- Released: May 1987
- Genre: Country
- Length: 2:50
- Label: MCA
- Songwriter(s): Margaret Archer, Chet Atkins
- Producer(s): Ray Stevens

Ray Stevens singles chronology
"Can He Love You Half as Much as I" (1986)	"Would Jesus Wear a Rolex" (1987)	"Three Legged Man" (1987)

Would Jesus Wear a Rolex is a song written by Margaret Archer and Chet Atkins, and recorded by Ray Stevens in 1987 on his album Crackin' Up!. The song reached 41 on the US Hot Country Songs chart and 45 on the Canadian Country chart.

The song tells of Stevens watching a televangelist, soliciting funds while wearing expensive clothing ("Asking me for $20, with $10,000 on his arm"). The remainder of the song consists of Stevens asking various questions in the manner of What Would Jesus Do?; the issues the singer raises parallel scandals surrounding various real-life televangelists of the era and some Christian and pastors.
