= Shriner's Convention =

"Shriners Convention"

Single by Ray Stevens

from the album 'Shriners Convention'
- B-side: "You're Never Goin' to Tampa with Me"
- Released: February 12, 1980
- Genre: Country
- Length: 5:33
- Label: RCA Records
- Songwriter(s): Ray Stevens
- Producer(s): Ray Stevens

Ray Stevens singles chronology
"I Need Your Help Barry Manilow" (1979)	"Shriners Convention" (1980)	"Night Games" (1980)

"Shriners Convention" is a song written and recorded by American musician Ray Stevens. It is based on Stevens' experiences at an Atlanta hotel where an actual Shriners convention was being held.

Shriners have taken the song as good-natured humor, and have even welcomed Stevens' participation in fundraising activities, as his fame attracts more attendees to charity events. It has been suggested that Stevens' presence indicates that Shriners have a sense of humor about themselves, making the group seem more accessible.

== Content ==
The premise of the song is the "43rd Annual Convention of the Grand Mystic Royal Order of the Nobles of the Ali Baba Temple of the Shrine." Each verse describes a different aspect of the convention - first a parade, then a formal banquet, and finally a ceremonial "secret meeting", which is actually a poker game.

=== "Meanwhile, back at the motel..." ===
The song's humor includes a series of phone calls between two Shriners from the Hahira delegation- "Illustrious Potentate" Bubba, and "Noble Lumpkin" Coy, the latter of whom fails to show up at any convention gatherings, choosing instead to cause trouble at the motel with his Harley, embarrassing the whole delegation.

Bubba expounds on some of the incidents including seeing a redhead girl wearing nothing but Coy's fez running through the banquet yelling out their secret code, and that he hopes Coy's wife Charlene doesn't find out that late the previous night he had been frolicking in the motel swimming pool in just his Fruit of the Looms with most of the waitresses from the cocktail lounge. Bubba eventually throws him out of the Shrine, but an undeterred Coy ponders joining the Hells Angels before cranking his motorcycle and hanging up.

While only Bubba's side of the conversation is heard, Coy's comments are made known through Bubba's replies; this comedic format is similar to routines made famous by Shelley Berman and Bob Newhart.

== Remake ==
In 1983, Stevens re-recorded the song, adding a reference to the Knights of Columbus in the dialogue.

== Music video ==
A video for "Shriners Convention" appears in Stevens's 1995 direct-to-video film, Get Serious! The song also ties into the film's plot, wherein a genuine Illustrious potentate and a county sheriff named Bubba, along with his deputy Coy (who in truth somewhat enjoys being mistaken for the Coy of the song) and certain family members and friends, believe that Stevens is deliberately misrepresenting them in his songs. All of this alludes to another Stevens song, "Dudley Do-Right of the Highway Patrol”.

== Chart performance ==
Chart (1980)	Peak position
U.S. Billboard Hot Country Singles	7
U.S. Billboard Bubbling Under Hot 100	1
Canadian RPM Country Tracks	2
