= Everything Is Beautiful =

Single by Ray Stevens

from the album Everything Is Beautiful
- B-side: "A Brighter Day"
- Released: March 1970
- Genre: Pop; country; soft rock
- Length: 3:29
- Label: Barnaby
- Songwriter: Ray Stevens
- Producer: Ray Stevens

Ray Stevens singles chronology
"I'll Be Your Baby Tonight" (1970)	"Everything Is Beautiful" (1970)	"America, Communicate with Me" (1970)

Music video
- Everything Is Beautiful on YouTube

"Everything Is Beautiful" is a song written, composed, and performed by Ray Stevens. It has appeared on many of his albums, including one named after the song, and has become a pop standard and common in religious performances. The children heard singing the hymn "Jesus Loves the Little Children" at the beginning of the song are from Oak Hill Elementary School in Nashville, Tennessee. At the time, this group included Stevens' two daughters, Suzi and Timi.

"Everything Is Beautiful" was responsible for two wins at the Grammy Awards of 1971: Grammy Award for Best Male Pop Vocal Performance for Ray Stevens and Grammy Award for Best Inspirational Performance for Jake Hess. Stevens' recording was the number 1 song on the Billboard Hot 100 singles chart for two weeks in summer 1970. "Everything Is Beautiful" also spent three weeks atop the Adult Contemporary chart. Many country stations played "Everything Is Beautiful", with it peaking at number 39 on Billboard's Country chart. Billboard ranked the record as the number 12 song of 1970. "Everything Is Beautiful" includes anti-racist and pro-tolerance lyrics, such as: "We shouldn't care about the length of his hair/Or the color of his skin".

"Everything Is Beautiful" is viewed as a major departure for Stevens, as the song is a more serious and spiritual tune, unlike some of his previous ("Gitarzan" and "Ahab the Arab") and subsequent ("The Streak") recordings, which were comedy/novelty songs. The record's success allowed Stevens (while still recording his comedy and novelty songs) to devote much of his 1970s work to more serious material, before pivoting back almost exclusively to comedy in the 1980s.

== Charts ==
=== Weekly charts ===
Chart (1970)	Peak position
Australian Singles Chart	1
Belgian VRT Top 30	25
Canadian RPM Top Singles	1
Dutch Top 40	12
Euro Hit 50	16
Irish Singles Chart	3
New Zealand (Listener)	16
UK Singles Chart	6
US Billboard Hot 100	1
US Billboard Easy Listening	1
US Billboard Hot Country Singles	39
US Cash Box Top 100	1

=== Year-end charts ===
Chart (1970)	Rank
Australia	21
Canada	34
US Billboard Hot 100	12
US Cash Box Top 100	25

== Jody Wayne cover ==
South African singer Jody Wayne covered "Everything is Beautiful" in early 1972. His version reached number 20 in his home nation.

== Other cover versions ==
- Jim Nabors covered the song in 1970 for his vinyl album of the same name. Reaching #124 on the Billboard Hot 200 chart.
- Bing Crosby recorded the song for his 1972 album Bing 'n' Basie.
- Neil Sedaka performed a version on his 1976 album Live in Australia.
- Dana named her 1980 album after the song. It made #43 in the UK chart. In 1986, her single reached #42 in Ireland.
- Foster & Allen recorded a version of the song for their album Songs We Love to Sing (1994), which reached number 41 on the UK Albums Chart and number 66 on the Irish albums chart.
- Cledus T. Judd did a version for the album Boogity, Boogity – A Tribute to the Comedic Genius of Ray Stevens. It features Michael English, Wynonna Judd, Trace Adkins, Rascal Flatts, Dobie Gray, Erika Jo and SHeDAISY as accompanying vocalists.
- In 2005, American Idol season 4 top-10 finalists covered this song during the top-ten results show.
- Stevens re-recorded the song in 2020. This "50th Anniversary" re-recording includes a spoken prologue and epilogue noting how much progress had been made since 1970, while calling out those who use diversity to divide society and beseeching Americans not to fall apart.
