= Jeremiah Peabody's Polyunsaturated Quick-Dissolving Fast-Acting Pleasant-Tasting Green and Purple Pills =

Single by Ray Stevens

from the album 1,837 Seconds of Humor
- B-side: "Teen Years"
- Released: July 1961
- Recorded: 1961
- Genre: Pop, novelty
- Length: 2:26
- Label: Mercury
- Songwriter: Ray Stevens
- Producer: Shelby Singleton

Ray Stevens singles chronology
"Happy Blue Year" (1960)	"Jeremiah Peabody's Polyunsaturated Quick-Dissolving Fast-Acting Pleasant-Tasting Green and Purple Pills" (1961)	"Scratch My Back (I Love It)" (1961)

"Jeremiah Peabody's Polyunsaturated Quick-Dissolving Fast-Acting Pleasant-Tasting Green and Purple Pills" is a novelty song that was written and performed by Ray Stevens. It was released as a single in 1961 and became Stevens' first Hot 100 single, peaking at #35 in September. Its lyrics tell of a fictional "wonder drug" that, when taken in a daily dose, can cure myriad ailments, much in the same way unscrupulous patent medicine salesmen marketed their wares in the 19th and early 20th centuries.

== Note about the title ==
The song is also notable for having the longest title (104 characters) of any single on the Billboard Hot 100 chart at the time of its release. In 1981, the Dutch remixers Stars on 45 released a medley with an official title 194 characters long - "Medley: Intro Venus/Sugar Sugar/No Reply/I'll Be Back/Drive My Car/Do You Want to Know a Secret/We Can Work It Out/I Should Have Known Better/Nowhere Man/You're Going to Lose That Girl/Stars on 45". Usually known simply as "Stars on 45", the record was legally required to list all of its component songs as part of its official title for copyright reasons, and thus usurped Stevens' record.

== Chart run ==
Billboard Hot 100 (6 weeks, entered August 21): Reached #35

Cashbox (8 weeks, entered August 19): 99, 81, 69, 59, 52, 42, 38, 61
