= Gitarzan =

Single by Ray Stevens

from the album Gitarzan
- B-side: "Bagpipes - That's My Bag"
- Released: January 6, 1969
- Genre: Pop
- Length: 3:15; 3:00 (7" version)
- Label: Monument
- Songwriters: Ray Stevens, Bill Everette
- Producers: Fred Foster, Ray Stevens, Jim Malloy

Ray Stevens singles chronology
"The Great Escape" (1968)	"Gitarzan" (1969)	"Along Came Jones" (1969)

"Gitarzan" is a novelty song released by Ray Stevens in 1969 about a character who lives in a jungle and forms a musical band with his female partner, Jane, and their pet monkey. The song features Tarzan's jungle calls, scat singing, and a funky boogie-woogie, a quote from the song "Swinging on a Star", with the line "Carrying moonbeams home in a jar" superimposed over an insistent G Major ostinato, and a melody from Martha and the Vandellas' "Honey Chile" in its chorus. The song reached #8 on the Billboard Hot 100 on 31 May 1969 and #10 in Canada in May 1969. It did best in New Zealand, where it reached #2. The music and lyrics were written by Stevens with a title and concept supplied by Bill Justis. Justis is officially credited as Bill Everette.

== Cover versions ==
A cover version was recorded by country music parodist Cledus T. Judd on his tribute album Boogity, Boogity - A Tribute to the Comedic Genius of Ray Stevens in 2007. Judd's cover features Keith Urban and Heidi Newfield, the latter of whom is the former lead singer of Trick Pony. An earlier cover appeared on Ralph's World's Green Gorilla, Monster and Me! (a children's music album) in 2006.

Animatronic robot band The Rock-afire Explosion performed the song on the "Fatz for President" showtape, created in June 1983 for Showbiz Pizza Place. This cover version, styled "Guitarzan", was arranged by the band's creator, inventor Aaron Fechter.
