= Along Came Jones (song) =

Single by The Coasters
- B-side: "That Is Rock & Roll"
- Released: May 1959
- Recorded: March 26, 1959
- Genre: Rock and roll
- Length: 2:53
- Label: Atco
- Songwriter: Jerry Leiber and Mike Stoller

The Coasters singles chronology
| "Charlie Brown" (1959) | "Along Came Jones" (1959) | "Poison Ivy" (1959) |

"Along Came Jones" is a comedic song written by Jerry Leiber and Mike Stoller and originally recorded by the Coasters in 1959. It peaked at number 9 on the Billboard Hot 100 and was recorded by many other groups and individuals in the years that followed.

== The song ==
Told from the perspective of a person watching television, the song tells of the interaction between a hero ("Jones"), a bad gunslinger ("Salty Sam") and a ranch owner ("Sweet Sue") on an unnamed television show.

The television shows feature various "damsel in distress" scenarios, whereby Sam abducts Sue and places her in peril, intending to force her to give him the deed to her ranch or face a gruesome death:

- In the first verse, the narrator watches Sam attempt to kill Sue by cutting her in half in an abandoned sawmill.
- In the second verse, the narrator prepares a snack during a commercial break, and comes back to see Sam attempting to destroy Sue with dynamite in an abandoned mine.
- In the third verse, apparently tired of the show, the narrator changes channels, only to find a different episode of the show, this time with Sam attempting to stuff Sue into a burlap sack and throw her in front of an oncoming train.

However, Sue is rescued each time, and Sam's plans foiled, by the hero, a "tall, thin", "slow-walkin'", "slow-talkin'", "long, lean, lanky" fellow named Jones. How — or even if — Jones defeats Sam and rescues Sue is never told.

The tenor saxophone heard on this record by The Coasters is King Curtis, who played the saxophone on many of their hits.

== Origins and meaning ==
Westerns were the most popular genre on TV and film in the 1950s and early 1960s. In mocking their inescapable presence, the song takes inspiration from the 1945 Gary Cooper film Along Came Jones, a comedy Western. In the film the "long, lean, lanky" Cooper lampoons his usual "slow-walkin', slow-talkin'" screen persona. The music for the film was composed by Arthur Lange, mentor to songwriter Mike Stoller. The idea for the song may also have been based on old movie serials like "The Perils of Pauline", "The Hazards of Helen" and "The Exploits of Elaine".

Historian Ken Emerson notes of the song: "What was original in the humor of 'Along Came Jones' was not its parody of shoot-'em-ups … What was new were black voices mocking an iconic Caucasian genre fifteen years before Mel Brooks' Blazing Saddles. Leiber's original lyrics sharpened the racial angle by calling attention to the hero's white hat, white boots, and faithful white horse. Those lines did not pass muster with Jerry Wexler, the executive producer at Atlantic to whom Leiber and Stoller generally reported."

== Chart performance ==
=== The Coasters ===
| Chart (1959) | Peak position |
|---|---|
| US Billboard Hot 100 | 9 |
| US Hot R&B Sides (Billboard) | 14 |

== Later Versions ==
- The Righteous Brothers included the song on their Sayin' Something album (1967). In their version, by the third verse Bill Medley, who says the repeated line "And then ...", has lost patience with the story as told by Bobby Hatfield.
- A comedy version by novelty pop artist Ray Stevens in 1969, reached a peak of #27 on the Billboard Hot 100. Stevens was also the voice of "Salty Sam," and (in falsetto) of "Sweet Sue," who screams for help and makes humorous ad-libs (e.g. "there he go again, tyin' me up, same routine", Help, he tied me up again", and "here comes the train, here comes the train"). The track features dubbed-in laughter and cheering from a "live" audience, and includes a brief quote from Rossini's "William Tell Overture" at the end.
- Micky Dolenz and Davy Jones (of Monkees fame) recorded it with songwriters Tommy Boyce and Bobby Hart, on the album Dolenz, Jones, Boyce & Hart in 1976. Jones makes humorous comments in a mock-posh British accent ("That's not cricket, old chap"). "Yakety Sax" is interpolated during the saxophone solo.
- The song was recorded in 1980 in a country duet by George Jones and Johnny Paycheck on their album Double Trouble.
- The French singer Henri Salvador recorded the song in French, but with different lyrics and a children's television hero in the starring role: "Zorro est arrivé" (1964).
- The Norwegian vocal group The Key Brothers, backed by The Quivers, shared a stage with Roger Moore in 1965, and for the occasion performed the song as "...og så kom Helgenen frem", with The Saint as the hero. The single became a huge hit in Norway.

== Popular culture ==
- The song is alluded to in the song "Million Dollar Bash" by Bob Dylan.
- An interpretation of the song appeared in a TV advertisement for Australian tyre retailer Beaurepaires during the 1980s.
- Patsy Biscoe covered it in 2004.
