= Jim Malloy (sound engineer) =

American recording engineer (c.1931–2018)

James Edward Malloy (c. 1931 – July 5, 2018) was an American recording engineer. He worked with such artists as Elvis Presley, Duke Ellington, Johnny Cash, Henry Mancini, and Mahalia Jackson. His association with Mancini earned him a Grammy Award for engineering the soundtrack of the 1963 film Charade.

== Background ==
Malloy was born in Dixon, Illinois, in 1931. In 1954, he moved to California to work in the electronics industry. He gained employment with NBC and attended night school at National Electronics in Los Angeles. He worked in electrical maintenance at a recording studio. Alan Emig, head of Columbia Records' West Coast division and a former mixing engineer for Capitol Records, tutored Malloy in engineering.

== Career ==
In late 1955, Malloy got a job at Radio Recorders. Gospel singer Mahalia Jackson was the first artist that Malloy was allowed to mix. From listening to her sing in the studio, he knew that engineering was what he wanted to do. Next, he worked with Duane Eddy, who liked Malloy's work so much that he suggested him to producer Chet Atkins who came to Los Angeles seeking an engineer.

Atkins wanted Malloy in Nashville, Tennessee, and he moved there in the mid-1960s. He worked with Atkins at RCA Studio B and RCA Studio A from January 1965 to November 1968, then at Monument Records. In the early 1970s, Malloy produced Sammi Smith's Grammy-winning recording of "Help Me Make It Through the Night" and started his own company, called DebDave Music, named after his two children, Debra and David.

== Accolades ==
Aside from his Grammy win, Malloy was nominated for five more Grammys for his work on Elvis Presley's How Great Thou Art, Eddy Arnold's The Last Word in Lonesome, The Latin Sound of Henry Mancini, The Pink Panther (1963) soundtrack, and "The Addams Family Theme".
