= Barnaby Records =

American record label

- Founded: 1963
- Founder: Andy Williams
- Status: Defunct
- Distributors: CBS, MGM, GRT
- Genre: Pop
- Country of origin: U.S.

Barnaby Records was an American record company founded by singer Andy Williams in 1963 with his purchase of soon-to-be-liquidated Cadence Records. It held the rights to work by a number of popular music performers including Williams' work before he was with Columbia Records.

Williams got control of the Cadence master tapes in the 1960s but limited releases to that of himself and another former Cadence artist, Lenny Welch. This material was released on Williams's label at the time, Columbia Records.

In 1970, Williams created the Barnaby label (named after his beloved dog Mr. Barnaby) to release the rest of the long unreleased Cadence archive, principally that of The Everly Brothers, which had been long out of print but in continued great demand. In 1971 Williams became the sole owner of the label when he bought out partner Alan Bernard. Barnaby also released new material by artists such as Ray Stevens, who scored Top Ten hits with his singles "Everything Is Beautiful" and "The Streak", some early LPs by Jimmy Buffett as well as a few LPs by Claudine Longet, who was Williams's wife at the time.

Barnaby had several distributors including CBS, then MGM, and finally GRT in 1974. Once Barnaby ceased operating as a working record company at the end of the 1970s, Williams licensed the old Cadence and Barnaby material to various other labels such as Varèse Sarabande and Rhino, and Time-Life after 1980, and he also leased some of the same material to Hip-O beginning in 1996.

== Performers ==
Performers signed to Barnaby include:

- Paul Anka
- Ken Berry
- Jimmy Buffett
- The Chordettes
- The Crickets
- The Everly Brothers
- The Hager Twins
- Doyle Holly
- Claudine Longet
- Charles Mingus
- The Osmond Brothers
- Don Shirley
- Ray Stevens
- Cecil Taylor
- The Toshiko - Mariano Quartet
- Lenny Welch
- Link Wray

== See also ==
- List of record labels
