= Ahab the Arab =

Single by Ray Stevens

from the album 1,837 Seconds of Humor
- B-side: "It's Been So Long"
- Released: May 1962
- Genre: Novelty
- Length: 2:47 (single version); 3:45 (album version)
- Label: Mercury
- Songwriter: Ray Stevens
- Producer: Shelby Singleton

Ray Stevens singles chronology
"Scratch My Back (I Love It)" (1961)	"Ahab the Arab" (1962)	"Furthermore" (1962)

Music video
- Listen to "Ahab the Arab" (Official Music Video) on YouTube

"Ahab the Arab" (also written "Ahab, the Arab") is a novelty song written and recorded by Ray Stevens in 1962.

== Lyrics ==
In the song, Arab is pronounced /ˈeɪræb/ (AY-rab). The hero of the story is Clyde the camel and Stevens made references to Clyde numerous times throughout his career. The song portrays a "sheik of the burning sands" named Ahab. He is highly decorated with jewelry, and every night he hops on his camel named Clyde on his way to see Fatima, who is the best dancer in the Sultan's harem. Fatima is described with a modified quote from the 1909 hit "I've Got Rings On My Fingers": "with rings on her fingers and bells on her toes and a bone in her nose, ho ho". During the ride, Ahab "speaks" (actually, produces ululations that parody the Arabic language) to Clyde. A 1969 re-recording adds the advertising catch phrase "Sold, American!" to the end of one chant. The phrase was well known from the commercials for radio's popular The Jack Benny Program, sponsored by Lucky Strike cigarettes. The program began and ended with two tobacco auctioneers rattling off prices in a rapid-fire similar to Stevens' delivery, ending with "Sold American!"

When Ahab finds Fatima in her tent, she is ironically engaged in stereotypically Western behavior: "eating on a raisin, and a grape, and an apricot, and a pomegranate, a bowl of chittlins, two bananas, three Hershey bars, and sipping on an RC co-cola, and eating a Moon Pie, listenin' to her transistor, watchin' the Grand Ole Opry, and readin' Mad Magazine while she sang, 'Does your chewing gum lose its flavor?'" Ahab woos Fatima with another mock Arabic chant, this time a quote from the song "Let's Twist Again" by Chubby Checker. Fatima (portrayed by Stevens in falsetto) responds to Ahab's advances with laughter and an (English) utterance that Ahab is "crazy".

Ahab loves Fatima, which apparently does not sit too well with the Sultan, whose appearance prompts an escape attempt, which does succeed, because Clyde was the fastest camel in the desert, and they "lived happily ever after" (the original single version was edited and does not mention the escape attempt at all, instead ending the song with Fatima saying, "Crazy, baby!").

== In Stevens' career ==
It followed "Jeremiah Peabody's Polyunsaturated Quick-Dissolving Fast-Acting Pleasant-Tasting Green and Purple Pills", becoming his second top 40 hit. It reached number five on Billboard's Hot 100 and number nine on the Billboard R&B chart. It remains one of the best-selling records of Stevens' career. Stevens has recorded the song at least three times and there have also been edited versions. Along with "The Streak", it was one of Stevens' biggest hits and contributed greatly to his popularity.

A later song by Stevens, a Christmas novelty number called "Santa Claus Is Watching You", features a "cameo" by Clyde. The intrepid camel is pressed into service in place of Rudolph the Red-Nosed Reindeer (in different recordings of the song, the famous reindeer's reason for being absent alternates between "He's on a stakeout at your house" or being "all stove up in the hospital" after injuring himself during "a twist contest"). The song also repeats the "Ahab the Arab" schtick of reciting a random list of objects, in this case gifts for "all the good little girls and boys."

Stevens has said that Clyde the camel was named after rhythm-and-blues singer Clyde McPhatter, formerly the lead singer of The Drifters. Clyde is arguably the most memorable character of the song, due to Stevens' exaggerated imitation of a camel's braying vocalization. Clyde has become something of a mascot for Stevens, and for several years in the late 1990s and early 2000s the artist released albums and video entertainment under the label Clyde Records (complete with camel-shaped logo). Clyde Records continues to be the outlet for a lot of contemporary material from Stevens.

Stevens' music publishing company was once named Ahab Music Inc. before he changed its name in 1977 to Ray Stevens Music. His publishing company is affiliated with BMI.

== Chart history ==
=== Weekly charts ===
Chart (1962)	Peak position
Australia	7
New Zealand (Lever Hit Parade)	3
U.S. Billboard Hot 100	5
U.S. Billboard Hot R&B Sides	9
U.S. Cash Box Top 100	2

=== Year-end charts ===
Chart (1962)	Rank
U.S. Billboard Hot 100	61
U.S. Cash Box	80

== Other versions ==
- Stevens re-recorded the song for his 1969 album Gitarzan and again for the song's music video in 1995.
- A cover version of Stevens' song was released in July 1962 by Jimmy Savile, backed by the English pop group The Tremeloes, featuring Brian Poole.
- Kinky Friedman recorded the song for his 1977 album Lasso from El Paso.
- Cledus T. Judd covered the song in his 2007 album Boogity, Boogity – A Tribute to the Comedic Genius of Ray Stevens.
