= Me =

Me most often refers to:

- Me (pronoun), the first-person singular pronoun, referring to the speaker

Me, M.E. or ME may also refer to:

== Language ==
- Me (cuneiform), a sign in cuneiform writing
- Me (kana), a letter in Japanese script
- Middle English, a historic phase of the English language

== Arts and entertainment ==
=== Music ===
==== Albums ====
- Me (Biff Bang Pow! album), 1991
- Me (Buck Brothers album), 2007
- Me (Empress Of album), 2015
- Me (Fiona album), 2005
- Me (James McCartney album), 2013
- Me (single album), by Jisoo, 2023
- Me (Jo Dee Messina album) or the title song, 2014
- Me (The Mekons album), 1998
- Me (Misono album), 2010
- Me (Ray Stevens album) or the title song, 1983
- Me (Sandie Shaw album), 1965
- Me (Super Junior-M album) or the title song, 2008
- Me..., by Emi Hinouchi, 2008

==== EPs ====
- Me (Aoxuan Lee EP), 2019
- Me (RaeLynn EP), 2015
- Me?, by Park Ye-eun, 2014
- Me, by Laura Marano, or the title song, 2019

==== Songs ====
- "Me" (Bill Anderson song), 1964
- "Me" (CLC song), 2019
- "Me" (Kelly Clarkson song), 2023
- "Me" (Paula Cole song), 1998
- "Me" (Tamia song), 2007
- "Me!", by Taylor Swift, 2019
- "Me", by Axium from Matter of Time, 2002
- "Me", by Pat Boone from Wish You Were Here, Buddy, 1966
- "Me", by Dev from The Night the Sun Came Up, 2011
- "Me", by Erykah Badu from New Amerykah Part One (4th World War), 2008
- "M.E.", by Gary Numan from The Pleasure Principle, 1979
- "Me", by Kina, 2000
- "Me", by Staind from Dysfunction, 1999
- "Me", by Summer Walker from Over It, 2019
- "Me", by the 1975 from Music for Cars, 2013
- "M.E.", by Underworld from Dubnobasswithmyheadman, 1994
- "Me (Without You)", by Andy Gibb from Andy Gibb's Greatest Hits, 1980

==== Other uses in music ====
- ME (band), an Australian rock group
- Me, a solfège syllable, for a note of the third scale degree

=== Publications ===
- Me (book), Elton John's 2019 autobiography
- Me (Moth), a 2021 novel in verse by Amber McBride
- Me: Stories of My Life, Katharine Hepburn's 1996 autobiography

=== Television ===
- Me (Doctor Who), a fictional character in the sci-fi series

== Television channels ==
- ME (TV channel), a defunct Italian channel latterly known as For You
- Me (TV channel), a South African channel
- ABC Me, a defunct Australian television channel
- ME, a proposed name for defunct Dutch television channel Yorin

== Business ==
- 23andMe (NASDAQ ticker symbol "ME")

== People and titles ==
- Maître (Me), a French honorific used for legal professionals
- Maritime Law Enforcement Specialist, a US Coast Guard rating
- Mary Engelbreit (born 1952), artist who signs paintings with an "ME" moniker
- Master of Engineering (ME), an academic degree

== Places ==
- La Mé, a region in Lagunes District, Ivory Coast
- ME postcode area, a group of postal districts around Medway, Kent, England
- Montenegro (ISO 3166-1 alpha-2 country code)
- Maine (U.S. postal abbreviation and ISO 3166-2 code), a US state

== Religion ==
- Me (mythology), a decree of the gods in Sumerian religion
- Me, an honorific form of bap offered to the deceased in Korean ancestral rites

== Science and technology ==
=== Biology and medicine ===
- Malic enzyme
- Medical examiner
- Metabolizable energy, the caloric content of food
- Metaescaline, a psychedelic drug related to mescaline
- Myalgic encephalomyelitis, an illness also known as chronic fatigue syndrome

=== Computing ===
- .me, the top-level Internet domain for Montenegro
- Me (computer science), a keyword in some programming languages
- Windows Me, a computer operating system
- Java Platform, Micro Edition, abbreviated as Java ME, a software platform for mobile and embedded devices
- MobileMe or me.com, a subscription-based collection of online services
- Intel Management Engine, an autonomous subsystem in Intel processor chipsets
- Mix/Effects, a section of a vision mixer

=== Other uses in science and technology ===
- Electron mass (m_{e}), the mass of a stationary electron
- Mechanical energy, in physics
- Methyl group (Me), a hydrocarbon group of atoms
- Mechanical engineering

== Transportation ==
- Middle East Airlines (IATA code)
- Morristown and Erie Railway (reporting mark), New Jersey, US
- Metra Electric District, a line on Chicago's Metra commuter rail system

== Other uses ==
- Malayalam era, in the solar Malayalam calendar of India
- Myanmar Era, a lunisolar system traditionally used in Myanmar

== See also ==
- Metal (M or Met), in generalized chemical reaction equations or structure formulas; see Pseudoelement symbols#General symbols
- Mae (disambiguation)
- Mai (disambiguation)
- Me TV (disambiguation)
- Mee (disambiguation)
- Mée (disambiguation)
- Mees (disambiguation)
- Mei (disambiguation)
- MES (disambiguation)
- Mi (disambiguation)
- Mii (disambiguation)
- Myself (disambiguation)
- Self (disambiguation)
