= Mee (surname) =

Mee is a surname, and may refer to

- Ada Mee (born 1946), German artist
- Arthur Mee (1875–1943), British journalist and encyclopedist
- Arthur Butler Phillips Mee (1860–1926), British journalist and editor
- Benjamin and Duncan Mee, owners of Dartmoor Zoological Park whose story is told in We Bought a Zoo.
- Ben Mee (born 1989), an English footballer
- Bertie Mee (1918–2001), British football player and manager
- Charles L. Mee (born 1938), American playwright, historian and author
- Charles Denis Mee (1927–2023), British-American engineer, physicist, and author
- Dom Mee, British sailor
- Georgie Mee (1900–1978), English footballer
- George L. Mee, rancher in King City, California, Mee Memorial Hospital hospital named for him
- Han Mee, vocalist of English rock band Hot Milk
- Henry Mee (born 1955), a British painter
- James Mee, American arresting sheriff in the Mel Gibson DUI incident
- Jennifer Mee (born 1991), American woman once known as the 'hiccup girl', now controversially serving life without parole for setting up a robbery that ended in murder
- John Henry Mee (1852–1918), Oxford clergyman, composer and author
- Margaret Mee (1909–1988), British artist
- Michie Mee (born 1970), Canadian rapper
- Sarah-Jane Mee (born 1979), British television presenter
- Steven Mee (born 1965), an English cricketer
- Tommy Mee (1890–1981), an American Baseball player

== See also ==
- Mees (disambiguation)
