= 自己 =

自己 meaning "myself", may refer to:

- Tự kỷ, meaning 'autism' in Vietnamese
- "自己", mandarin version of the song "Reflection", which used to of the film Mulan, sung by Coco Lee and Liu Yifei. It originally sung by Christina Aguilera.

== See also ==
- The dictionary definition of 自 at Wiktionary
- The dictionary definition of 己 at Wiktionary
- Myself (disambiguation)
