= My =

My or MY may refer to:

== Arts and entertainment ==
- My (radio station), a Malaysian radio station
- Little My, a fictional character in the Moomins universe
- My (Edyta Górniak album), by Edyta Górniak
- My (Jamala album), by Jamala
- My (EP), by Cho Mi-yeon

== Business ==
- Marketing year, variable period
- Model year, product identifier

== Transport ==
- Motoryacht
- Motor Yacht, a name prefix for merchant vessels
- Midwest Airlines (Egypt), IATA airline designation
- MAXjet Airways, United States, defunct IATA airline designation

== Other uses ==
- My, the genitive form of the English pronoun I
- Malaysia, ISO 3166-1 country code
  - .my, the country-code top level domain (ccTLD)
- Burmese language (ISO 639 alpha-2)
- Megalithic Yard, a hypothesised, prehistoric unit of length
- Million years

== See also ==
- MyTV (disambiguation)
- μ ("mu"), a letter of the Greek alphabet
- Mi (disambiguation)
- Me (disambiguation)
- Myself (disambiguation)
