= Mee =

Mee or MEE may refer to:

- Ekari people, also known as the Mee, ethnic group from Central Papua, Indonesia
- Ekari language, also known as the Mee language, a Trans–New Guinea language of Indonesia
- Maré Airport, via IATA code, airport in Maré, New Caledonia
- Mass extinction event
- Massey Energy, a former coal extractor in the United States
- Mee, a term for Chinese noodles commonly used in Southeast Asia
- Mee (crater), a lunar impact crater
- MEE (psychedelic), organic compound, 2-methoxy-4,5-diethoxyamphetamine
- Mee (surname), surname list
- Middle East Eye, news outlet covering the Middle East
- Migration enhanced epitaxy, a refined molecular-beam epitaxy technique
- Ministry of Ecology and Environment of the People's Republic of China
- Multiple-effect evaporator
- Multistate Essay Examination, a test consisting of essay questions largely concerning common law

== See also ==
- Me (disambiguation)
- Mée (disambiguation)
- Mees (disambiguation)
