= Mees =

Mees may refer to:

== People ==
=== Given name ===
- Mees Bakker (born 2001), Dutch footballer
- Mees Erasmus (born 1994), South African rugby union player
- Mees Gerritsen (born 1939), Dutch track cyclist
- Mees Hoedemakers (born 1998), Dutch footballer
- Mees Kaandorp (born 1998), Dutch footballer
- Mees Siers (born 1987), Dutch footballer
- Mees de Wit (born 1998), Dutch footballer

=== Surname ===
- Gerlof Mees (1926-2013), Dutch ornithologist
- Heleen Mees (born 1968), Dutch economist
- Helga Mees (1937-2014), German fencer
- Herman Mees (1880–1964), Dutch artist
- Jared Mees (born 1986), American motorcycle racer
- Jim Mees (1955–2013), American set designer
- Joshua Mees (born 1996), German footballer
- Jules Mees (1876–1937), Belgian historian
- Ludger Mees (born 1957), German historian
- Kenneth Mees (1882–1960), British-American physicist and photographic researcher
- Paul Mees (1961-2013), Australian planner and academic
- Philibert Mees (1929–2006), Flemish composer and pianist
- Tom Mees (1949–1996), American sports broadcaster
- Tom Mees (cricketer) (born 1981), English cricketer
- Victor Mees (1927-2012), Belgian footballer

== Other uses ==
Mees or MEES may also refer to:

- Mées, a town in the Landes department, France
- Mees (crater), a lunar crater
- C.E.K. Mees Observatory, an astronomical observatory
- Mees's nightjar (Caprimulgus meesi), a bird in the family Caprimulgidae
- Middle East Economic Survey, a weekly newsletter
- Mee's Bus Lines, Melbourne, Australia
- Minimum Energy Efficiency Standards, applicable to private rented property in the United Kingdom under the MEES regulations
- Mauricie English Elementary School, a school in Trois-Rivières, Québec
- Mees (aircraft), KLM Douglas DC-3 aircraft named "Mees"
  - Shooting of the Mees, an 1939 aviation incident in which the aircraft was attacked by a German aircraft.

== See also ==
- Les Mées (disambiguation)
- Mee (disambiguation)
- Mée (disambiguation)
