= Pipher =

Pipher is a surname. Notable people with the surname include:

- Jill Pipher (born 1955), American mathematician
- Judith Pipher (1940–2022), American astrophysicist and astronomer
- Mary Pipher (born 1947), American clinical psychologist and author

== See also ==
- Piper (surname)
