= MAE =

Mae or MAE may refer to:

== Aviation ==
- Mali Air Express, an airline (2005–2020)
- MAE, Madera Municipal Airport, California, United States

== Finance ==
- Material adverse effect, in finance
- Mercado Abierto Electrónico, an Argentinian stock exchange

== Government ==
- Ministry for Europe and Foreign Affairs (France) (French: Ministère de l'Europe et des Affaires étrangères)
- Ministry of Foreign Affairs (Italy) (Italian: Ministero degli affari esteri)
- Ministry of Foreign Affairs (Luxembourg) (French: Ministère des Affaires Étrangères)
- Ministry of Foreign Affairs (Romania) Romanian: Ministerul Afacerilor Externe)
- Victorian Multicultural Awards for Excellence, Victoria, Australia

== Languages ==
- Tirax language (or Mae), spoken on Malakula, Vanuatu
- Maii language (or Mae), spoken on Epi, Vanuata

== Music ==
- Mae, American rock band
- "Mae" (song), a 1965 song by Riz Ortolani
- Meridian Arts Ensemble
- "Mae", a 2012 song by The Gaslight Anthem from the album Handwritten
- "Mae", a 1965 single by Herb Alpert that appeared on the album Going Places

== People ==
- Mae (given name)
- Mae (surname)
- Mäe, an Estonian surname

== Places ==
- Mae, Washington, a community in the United States
- Maè, a river in Italy
- MAE, Madera Municipal Airport, California, United States

== Science and technology ==
- Macintosh Application Environment, emulation software for Unix
- Materials Adherence Experiment, a material science experiment conducted during NASA's Mars Pathfinder mission
- Mean absolute error, a measure of statistical deviation
- Member of the Academia Europaea, a European academic award
- Motion aftereffect, a visual illusion
- MAE-East or MAE-West, two of the first Internet Exchange Points
