= Langley Park School for Boys =

Location
- Beckenham, Greater London, BR3 3BP; England; 51°23′19″N 0°01′16″W

Information
- Type: Academy
- Motto: "mores et studia"
- Established: 1901
- Department for Education URN: 136586 Tables
- Ofsted: Reports
- Gender: Co-ed for 16+, boys-only from 11-16
- Age: 11 to 18
- Colour: Maroon
- Former pupils: Old Beccehamians
- Website: lpsb.org.uk

Langley Park School for Boys (Note: Also known as Langley Park Boys' School or LPBS) is a boys secondary academy school in Beckenham in the London Borough of Bromley, with a co-ed sixth form. On 31 March 2011, the school converted from a Foundation School to an academy and its current status is that of an "Academy Converter".

== Location ==
It is situated near Eden Park and the Bethlem Royal Hospital on Hawksbrook Lane close to the boundary of the London Borough of Bromley with the London Borough of Croydon. Construction for the new school building was completed in December 2011, and the staff and pupils moved into the building in January 2012, following which the old buildings were demolished.

== Admissions ==
- At 11+, admission to the school is according to the London Borough of Bromley education admissions procedures.
- At 16+, the school has changed its admissions policy and it is now also dependent on the proximity of the pupil's home to the school.
- At 16+, the school is co-educational.

== Sport ==
Langley Park School for Boys is one of the minority of state schools that play rugby and hockey, and is one of the top three hockey schools in the country, having competed in the last four national finals.

In 2004 the under-16 team were crowned national champions, the first comprehensive school to achieve this. More recently during the 2021/22 season the 1st XI finished 7th in the England Hockey Tier 1 Championship; of which one player (Dan Hamilton) carried on the success internationally, captaining England juniors in the 4 Nations Tournament and European Championships in Hanau, Germany.

In the 2021 Cricket season, the 1st XI won the Kent cup beating out Simon Langton Grammar School for Boys by 33 runs after 35 overs.

In 2021/22, the U15 rugby squad made it to the semi-finals of the Schools Vase, where they lost to Torquay Boys' Grammar School. Despite the match ending in a 12–12 draw and taking place in a neutral venue, Torquay went through as they were drawn to be the away side in this tie, following standard tiebreaker practice in previous rounds.

The new buildings for the school provide private hockey facilities for the school, which are currently being shared with Langley Park School for Girls. Other sports include tennis, basketball, football and table tennis.

== Music ==
Langley Park School for Boys' music department offers groups from the traditional concert band, chamber orchestra, brass band and choir, to world music styles, including a Cuban band and an African drumming group.

In 2013, the brass band was one of the finalists of the national Music for Youth competition who were selected to perform at Royal Albert Hall. The band played in the Primary Proms show, and performed Take That's "Shine", the theme from The Magnificent Seven and Concierto de Aranjuez.

== History ==
The school was originally the Beckenham Technical Institute, opening in 1901 and situated in what is now Venue 28, Beckenham. The school went through a variety of name changes in its early days: the Technical Day School, Beckenham; Beckenham Secondary School; Beckenham County School for Boys; Beckenham and Penge County School for Boys; in 1944 it was the Beckenham and Penge County Grammar School under headmaster L.W. White, MA (Cantab). In 1950 the school was mentioned in the scientific journal Nature. The article in Nature explained that a periodical named "Beckenham and Penge Grammar School : Scientific Society Proceedings" existed in which scientific work done by the boys was reported. By 1954 it was called Beckenham and Penge Grammar School for Boys.

An increase in size meant the school moved to new buildings in High St, Penge, in 1931. It moved from Penge to its present location in Eden Park, Beckenham, in January 1969, at which point it adopted its current name. Around 1973 or 1974 Langley Park School for Boys converted from Grammar to a Comprehensive intake school, as many others did, in line with the policies of Labour Education Secretary Shirley Williams and the Comprehensive intake, including streaming, worked its way up the age-groups through subsequent years. In the late 1980s, schools could opt out of local government control by becoming a Grant-maintained school which were funded by a direct grant of money from the central government. This new arrangement enabled schools to have greater control of their finances than they would have had under local government control. Hansard indicates that a ballot of parents occurred on 8 March 1991 regarding the question of the school becoming a "grant maintained school". The school was given a grant of £60,000 as a transitional grant.

The school outgrew its present accommodation and a completely new building was constructed adjacent to the location of the former school, which was occupied from January 2012.

The school motto, Mores et Studia, means "good character and learning".

== Headteachers ==
The school started in 1901, as the Beckenham Technical Institute at a site close to Beckenham's public baths. The headmaster was Mr C.T.F. Watts. In 1931 he was replaced by Sidney Gammon. On 23 October 1940 Gammon was killed by a bomb dropped during the war. Mr Gammon was replaced by Mr L.W. White who was appointed in September 1941. In December 1962, Mr White retired and was replaced by David Raeburn.

Five terms after the school moved to its current site, off South Eden Park Road, headmaster David A. Raeburn retired, and was replaced by B.A. Phythian. In December 1989, Brian Phythian was succeeded by R.V.P. Sheffield, who was in the post until 1999, leaving the school under allegations of financial irregularities. The deputy headteacher, K McGregor, took over as acting headteacher until the appointment of R Northcott in 2001, who left in July 2013. In July 2022, Steve Parsons resigned as Headmaster. He had an eight-year tenure, beginning in September 2013.

The current headteacher is Suzanne Munday, who took the role in April 2023.

== Notable former pupils ==
- Rory Allen, former Tottenham Hotspur and Portsmouth footballer
- Matt Hankin, English rugby union player
- Rob Key, managing director of the England men's cricket team, former England cricketer and Kent captain
- Jack McManus, singer/songwriter
- Henry Mee, artist
- Tom Misch, singer, songwriter, producer
- Ben Phillips, former Kent cricketer
- Bradley Pritchard, former Charlton Athletic footballer
- Samuel Reardon, Team GB Olympian Paris 2024, 4x400m Relay
- Dave Roberts, author of The Bromley Boys (in which Roberts recounts his time as a pupil at Langley Park)
- Philip Sesemann, Team GB Olympian 2024, Marathon runner

=== Beckenham and Penge County Grammar School ===
- Hugh Bean CBE, professor of violin at the Royal College of Music 1954–2003
- Carey Blyton, composer of Bananas in Pyjamas
- Harold Bride, wireless operator on the RMS Titanic
- Air Vice-Marshal Ronald Dick CB, station commander of RAF Honington 1978–80, and head of British Defence Staff – US 1984–88
- Patrick Ground, Conservative MP for Feltham and Heston 1983–92
- Norman Hunter, writer, creator of Professor Branestawm
- John Clifford Strong CBE, Governor of the Turks and Caicos Islands 1978–82
- John Tyndall, Neo-Nazi political activist
- Derek Underwood, Kent and England bowler (known as "Deadly" by the Australians)
- Bill Wyman, musician, ex-member of the Rolling Stones

== Arms ==
Coat of arms of Langley Park School for Boys
Notes Granted on 4 August 1926. Crest On a wreath Argent and Gules, an oak tree fructed Proper an escutcheon Or charged with a mitre Gules, mantled Gules doubled Argent. Escutcheon Tierced in pale Gules, Azure and lozengy Gules and Ermine the first charged with a horse forcene Argent the second with a cross moline Or. Motto 'Mores et Studia'

The shield depicts the 'white horse of Kent' and the two families taking control of the Manor of Beckenham: Bruyns (1300-1465), and de la Rokele (1240-1300). An allusion to a neighbouring woodland owned by Westminster Abbey is made in the crest of an oak tree and a mitre. The motto was suggested by a master.

== See also ==
- Langley Park School for Girls
