= Selves (disambiguation) =

Selves may refer to:

== People ==
- Carmen Selves (b. 1931), Catalan contemporary painter
- Justin de Selves (1848-1934), French politician
- Lester Selves (1906-1991), American American football player

== Places ==
- Selves (river), a tributary of the Truyère in the Aveyron department, France

== Other ==
- Selves, the plural of self

== See also ==
- Self (disambiguation)
