= Mae (surname) =

Mae, Mäe or Maé is a surname that may refer to

- Audra Mae (born 1984), American singer-songwriter and violin player
- Christophe Maé (born 1975), French singer
- Jaak Mae (born 1972), Estonian cross-country skier
- Vanessa-Mae (born 1978) a British violinist of Thai-Chinese descent
