= We Are Merely Filters =

Studio album by Buck Brothers
- Released: 5 April 2010
- Recorded: 2009
- Genre: Pop; Punk
- Producer: Buck Brothers and Kennan Keating

Buck Brothers chronology
Me (2007)	We Are Merely Filters (2010)

We Are Merely Filters is the second album by British band Buck Brothers.

Two singles were released from the album: "When I Look At You (All I Think About Is Sex)" and "You're So Good, Good, Good You're Great".

It was released digitally on 5 April 2010 and physically in the UK on 28 June 2010. Later that year, Detroit label Static Records released the album stateside.

== Track listing ==
1. "All I Want To Do"
2. "Are You In?"
3. "When I Look At You (All I Think About Is Sex)"
4. "All The Things"
5. "Heartfelt By Numbers"
6. "No More Yesterdays"
7. "She's Not Wearing Any"
8. "You're So Good, Good, Good You're Great"
9. "Remission"
10. "Pop Muzik"
11. "Deeply Shallow"
