= MyTV =

MyTV (or My TV) may refer to these television brands:

== Africa ==
- MYtv, a South African TV channel

== Asia ==
- Television Broadcasts Limited's online service in Hong Kong
- My TV (Bangladeshi TV channel)
- MYTV Broadcasting, a Malaysian digital terrestrial television provider
- MYTV (Indonesia), an Indonesian television network
- myTV (mobile service), a defunct mobile TV service; see DVB-H § Service launches

== Europe ==
- My-Tv, an Italian internet television founded November 2000
- MYTV International, a digital entertainment media company
- MYtv Ukraine, a provider of satellite pay-TV services throughout Ukraine
- MyTV (British and Irish TV channel), formerly known as My Channel

== North America ==
- MyTV (Arabic), an Arab-American provider of Arabic live channels and video on demand
- MyNetworkTV, an American television network/syndication service
- WWJE-DT (formerly WZMY, marketed as "MyTV"), a television station licensed to Derry, New Hampshire

== See also ==
- Me TV (disambiguation)
- MeTV
- MYT (disambiguation)
- MY (disambiguation)
- TV (disambiguation)
