= One More Last Chance (album) =

Studio album by Ray Stevens
- Released: February 1981
- Genre: Country
- Label: RCA Victor
- Producer: Ray Stevens

Ray Stevens chronology
| Oh Lonesome Me (1981) | One More Last Chance (1981) | Don't Laugh Now (1982) |

One More Last Chance is the eighteenth studio album by Ray Stevens as well and his second for RCA Records, released in 1981. The front of the album cover shows Stevens dressed in cowboy attire and at a bar with a pretty, flirtatious woman standing at his side. The singles "Night Games" and "One More Last Chance" (unrelated to the later Charley Pride hit and Vince Gill hit songs of the same names) were lifted from this album. The album was a pivot back toward more serious material for Stevens, as he felt that the novelty music he had been recording in the late 1970s was falling out of fashion; he eventually returned to novelty music in 1984.

== Track listing ==
Side A
| No. | Title | Writer(s) | Length |
|---|---|---|---|
| 1. | "One More Last Chance" | Bynum, Reneau | 4:10 |
| 2. | "Just About Love" | Sharp | 3:19 |
| 3. | "Certain Songs" | Tupper Saussy | 2:48 |
| 4. | "Melissa" | C.W. Kalb, Jr. | 5:00 |
| 5. | "I Believe You Love Me" | Tupper Saussy | 2:42 |

Side B
| No. | Title | Writer(s) | Length |
|---|---|---|---|
| 1. | "Pretend" | Douglas, Parman, LaVere | 4:04 |
| 2. | "It's Not All Over" | Sharp | 3:25 |
| 3. | "Let's Do It Right This Time" | C.W. Kalb, Jr. | 2:57 |
| 4. | "Take Your Love" | Sharp | 3:19 |
| 5. | "Night Games" | C.W. Kalb, Jr. | 3:22 |

== Personnel ==
- Arranged and Produced by Ray Stevens
- Engineer – Stuart Keathley
- Recorded at Ray Stevens Studio (Nashville, Tennessee)
- Mastering by Randy King at Randy's Roost (Nashville, Tennessee)
- Photography – Slick Lawson
- Art Direction – Bill Barnes

Musicians

- Ray Stevens – vocals, backing vocals, keyboards, synthesizers, horns, percussion
- Mark Casstevens – acoustic guitars, electric guitars
- John Clausi – acoustic guitars, electric guitars
- Dale Sellers – electric guitars
- Hal Rugg – steel guitar
- Larry (Wimpy Wayne) Sasser – steel guitar
- Stuart Keathley – bass
- Jerry Carrigan – drums
- Jerry Kroon – drums
- Shelly Kurland Strings – strings
- Lisa Silver – backing vocals

== Chart performance ==
=== Singles ===
| Year | Single | Peak positions | |
| Year | Single | US Country | CAN Country |
|---|---|---|---|
| 1980 | "Night Games" | 20 | 11 |
| 1981 | "One More Last Chance" | 33 | 46 |
