= Aoxuan Lee =

- 李奥轩
- Born: Li Ao-xuan; April 15, 1990 (age 36); Xicheng District, Beijing, China
- Education: Showa Academia Musicae
- Occupations: Singer; songwriter; electronic organ player
- Years active: 2019–present
- Parents: Li Fu-sheng (father); Wang Xue-mei (mother)
- Musical career
- Genres: Pop
- Instrument: Vocals

Aoxuan Lee
- Simplified Chinese: 李奥轩
- Traditional Chinese: 李奧軒
Transcriptions
Standard Mandarin
- Hanyu Pinyin: Lǐ Àoxuān

Aoxuan Lee (Chinese: 李奥轩; pinyin: Lǐ Àoxuān; born on April 15, 1990) is a Chinese-born singer, songwriter, dancer, actor, and Electone player. In 2019, Lee released his debut single “San Er Yi (Three Two One)”, a China-Japan multinational collaboration, marking his official debut. In 2022, Lee released the single “The Moon Under the Same Sky”, expanding his musical expression into multiple languages.

== Early life ==
Lee was born on April 15, 1990, in Xicheng District, Beijing. His father's name is Li Fu-sheng and his mother's name is Wang Xue-mei. Lee began to learn to dance and play the keyboard at the age of 4. He studied at Wuding Primary School in Xicheng District, Beijing. During the National Day, he participated in the school singing competition and won the championship. Lee was enrolled in Beijing No. 159 Middle school. In 2004, he temporarily stopped school returning in 200 when he became the keyboard player of the "Electric Music Team" in the school. He then attended the Shimei High School in Xicheng District. In his second year in high school, he participated in the Beijing Music Competition, and played the "People's Heart to Flower " won the championship in Beijing.

After leaving school, Lee studied at the Beijing Modern Music Institute. After entering the Conservatory of Music, he participated in international music competitions during the holidays. In 2009, Lee began to try to arrange composition. In February 2010, he went to Hong Kong to participate in the first Asian International electric organ competition, and finally won two major awards (Performance Gold Award and Best Arranger Award). In August 2011, he participated in the China Electone competition and won two awards (Gold Award and Best Composition Award).

== Career ==
=== 2013–2018: Studying abroad ===
In 2013, Lee was invited to attend the 8th National Congress of the National Electronic Keyboard Music Association in Japan, and the president granted Lee "the first foreigner in the National Electronic Keyboard Music Association of Japan". In 2014, he enrolled in the composition department of the Showa Academia Musicae in Japan. He began his four-year "student player" career. In 2015, he participated in the Yamaha Electone Ginza competition in Japan. After that, this event was published in the professional magazine Electone in Japan. In 2016, he participated in the Amabile Organ Contest in Japan. The contest was "Beijing Good News to the Border Village", it once again set a record and he became the first foreigner to play Chinese works since the creation in the competition. In August 2016, he was invited to participate in the China and Japan electronic organ concert. At the Tokyo Olympic Center, he and his Japanese violinist Runa Matsuura played their original music work "Miss You". On November 13, he was invited to attend the 12th Japan Electronic Keyboard National Conference and he gave a speech in Japanese at the conference, becoming the first Chinese to stage a personal speech at the conference stage. In 2017, he participated in the "K" International Music Composer Competition. His entry was a piano solo piece which was divided into three movements. The solo was performed by a Japanese pianist, Siba Kaito, and the work won the Best Composition Award. In September of the same year, he was invited to attend the 13th Japan Electronic Keyboard National Conference "Young Electronic Organ Players Concert". Lee played the Chinese famous "Spring Festival Overture" and the original music "Physical", which became the only foreign performance in the concert. After four years of studying abroad, Lee's semester grades were recognized by university teachers and he also received four consecutive years of scholarships. In 2016 and 2017, his deeds were published in school propaganda books. In March 2017, Lee signed as a songwriter with Ocean Butterflies. In October of the same year, he signed with Song & Smile Co., Ltd. and Innovation Creative Co., Ltd. in Japan.

=== 2018–2019: Three Two One, ME ===
In May 2018, Lee attended the Japan and China Asian Cultural Calligraphy Exhibition, a 30-minute performance, and the enthusiastic response made it unforgettable. On June 1, the music composed by Lee was included in the "Chinese Electronic Keyboard Proficiency Test Level 5 Textbook" by the Electronic Keyboard Society of the Chinese Musicians Association. On June 22 and July 13, Lee held two "China Feel" personal Electone concerts in Tokyo. The original music and Chinese famous songs accounted for half of the songs in the concert;

On January 1, 2019, Lee performed a duet with Kasumi Aizawa, a new-generation Japanese singer, and released the China-Japan multinational collaboration single "San Er Yi (Three Two One)", marking his official entry into the entertainment industry. The single tells about a relationship between love and friend. In March, Lee was invited to attend the 2019 National Conference on Electronic keyboard Music in Japan, Mr. Suguru Agata, the former president, stated: "By 2019, Lee was the only foreign participant who had attended the conference for seven consecutive years." On September 30, Lee released his first solo piano EP, "ME". This piano EP is named "ME" to reflect the idea of encouraging people to be their true selves. It explores the listener's inner self from a first-person perspective. All the compositions on the EP originate from Lee's inner world, shaped by his past experiences.

=== 2020–2024: A World with Border, The Moon Under the Same Sky ===
In April 2020, Lee composed a single titled "A World with Borders" to call for fighting against the COVID-19 pandemic. This song was composed by Lee. Sung by the Japanese female singer Kasumi Aizawa. On December 31, 2022, Lee released his first Japanese-language single, "The Moon Under the Same Sky", which is also his first original song in Japanese. The single was co-produced with Canadian music producer Bobby John and marked Lee's initial entry into the Japanese music market. The song went viral in Thailand and reached No. 2 on the country's Twitter trending chart the following day. In September 9, 2023, Lee held a solo online concert titled "Butterfly". The concert was performed without a live audience and was streamed internationally, allowing fans from different regions to watch. The program included performances of his previous releases as well as new material. On March 14, 2024, he attended the Chanel event "Rouge Allure Velvet Nuit Blanche" in Tokyo.

=== 2025–present ===
On June 28, 2025, Lee held a small fan meeting titled "Soundtrack of Us" in Minami-Aoyama, Tokyo, Japan. In January 2026, Lee released a symphonic version of his Japanese-language song "The Moon Under the Same Sky", marking his first orchestral arrangement of the work. On January 31, 2026, Lee held a virtual concert titled "FLOW" via Bilibili. The performance featured rearranged versions of his representative works supported by an upgraded visual and stage production. At the conclusion of the event, Lee officially announced the upcoming release of a new single in March 2026, which aims to incorporate diverse musical elements and mature creative concepts.

== Vocal style ==
Lee is mainly a singer of the tenor voice, has a cognition of singing ability, and combines his own voice characteristics and the type of music he is good at to establish his own singing style. Lee entered Japan avex Entertainment Co., Ltd. in 2017 to receive art training. With the Japanese Da-ice, Lol and other first-line singers belong to the same division. Lee's natural sound situation is that the sound line is thinner and the music is narrower. Therefore, it is often criticized by outsiders for being weak and not suitable for being a singer. Although Lee's singing is not outstanding, it is certainly highly recognizable. After Lee entered the avex training, he constantly improved his singing ability. He knew that although he was not a natural singer, he believed that he would improve his singing ability by receiving sound training. On January 1, 2019, Lee opened his first time and sang the multinational single "San Er Yi (Three Two One)" with the Japanese female singer Aizawa. The melody range of the song is large and the sound is difficult to control. However, Lee's singing skills have completely smashed all these difficulties, perfectly showing his singing skills and unique sounds, plus the later Electronic Sound mixing, which adds to the song. The song gained popularity in Japan in 2019, particularly among young couples.

== Achievements ==
In 2012, Lee won the Asia Pacific Electronic Organ Best Composition Award for his original music. In 2013, Lee entered the Japan Electronic keyboard Association as the world's "first" foreigner. In 2014, Lee became the first Chinese performer to play Chinese music since the history of "Amabile Organ Contest" in Japan. In 2016, Lee was invited to attend the 12th Japan Electronic keyboard National Conference and gave a speech in Japanese at the conference, becoming the "first" Chinese to stage a personal speech at the conference stage. In 2017, Lee was invited to attend the 13th Japan Electronic keyboard National Conference "Young Electronic Organ Players Concert", which became the "first" foreign performer in the concert.

== Philanthropy ==
In 2020, Lee donated JPY4.0 million and 10 thousand masks to Wuhan Charity Federation to help protect against the COVID-19 pandemic. On February 19 of the same year, Aoxuan was invited to record the slogan together with the government organs of various countries in the world in the public welfare activity on protection of novel COVID-19 pandemic initiated by China Media Group.

== Discography ==
=== Singles ===
- "San Er Yi (Three Two One)" (2019)
- "The Moon Under the Same Sky" (2022)

=== Piano EPs ===
- "ME" (2019)
