= MES =

MES may refer to:

== Educational institutions ==
- Maharashtra Education Society, Pune, India
- Modern Education Schools, Cairo, Egypt
- MES Institute of Technology and Management
- MES Pattambi

== Companies and organizations ==
- Marconi Electronic Systems, a defunct British company
- Mesaba Airlines, former US airline, ICAO code
- Military Engineering Service, of the Pakistan Army
- Military Engineer Services (India), of the Indian Army
- Ministry of Emergency Situations (disambiguation), departments of various governments
- Former Movement of Socialist Left, Portugal

== Chemicals ==
- MES (buffer), 2-(N-morpholino)ethanesulfonic acid
- Mesityl group (Mes) in Mesitylene

== Economics and business ==
- Manufacturing execution systems, to track materials
- Minimum efficient scale of production

== Places ==
- Mes, Albania, location of the Mesi Bridge
- Polonia International Airport, Medan, Indonesia, IATA code

== Technologies ==
- Marine evacuation system, on ships
- Medium Edison screw, E26/E27 light bulb base
- Mobile earth station, in International Telecommunication Union terminology
- Multilingual European subsets (MES-1 to MES-3) of Unicode

== Other uses ==
- Oleksii Mes (1993–2024), Ukrainian fighter pilot
- Musical ear syndrome
- MES, an Electronic, Dubstep, Rocktronic, Pop Punk Music Producer, DJ, and Vocalist
- Maharashtra Ekikaran Samiti, a social committee based out of Belagavi city of India's Karnataka state
- Mark E. Smith, English singer and frontman of The Fall
- Manufacturing execution system

== See also ==
- Mees (disambiguation)
- Mez (disambiguation)
