= The Moon Under the Same Sky =

Single by Aoxuan Lee
- Released: December 31, 2022
- Recorded: 2022
- Studio: Tokyo, Japan; Canada (post-production)
- Genre: J-pop
- Length: 3:50
- Label: Worldcore
- Songwriters: Aoxuan Lee, Yuu Moroi
- Producers: Aoxuan Lee, Bobby John

Aoxuan Lee singles chronology
"San Er Yi" (2019)	"The Moon Under the Same Sky" (2022)

Music video
- Aoxuan Lee (李奧軒) - 同じ空の月 | Live Session on YouTube

"The Moon Under the Same Sky" (Japanese: 同じ空の月) is the first original Japanese-language song by singer Aoxuan Lee. It was released on December 31, 2022, by the Japanese music company Worldcore. The song was composed by Aoxuan Lee, with lyrics by Yuu Moroi, and produced by Aoxuan Lee and Bobby John.

== Background and production ==
After releasing the Japanese-language charity single "A World with Borders" in 2020 during the COVID-19 pandemic, Aoxuan Lee began to pursue broader opportunities in the Japanese music industry. The Moon Under the Same Sky is his first original Japanese-language song, conceived with the concept of conveying emotional connections across distances. The lyrics were written by Japanese lyricist Yuu Moroi, and the composition was created by Lee. Production was handled by Lee in collaboration with Canadian producer Bobby John. Recording took place in Tokyo in mid-2022, while instrumental recording and post-production were completed in Canada. The song was released on December 31, 2022.

== Musical style and artwork ==
The Moon Under the Same Sky is a piano-driven pop ballad with a minimalist arrangement that emphasizes Lee’s vocal performance and melody. The production uses only piano to highlight the emotional tone of the song. The single’s cover art was created by Korean illustrator Lee Byung-kwan (이병관), with a style that complements the overall theme of the release without depicting specific details of the illustration.

== Promotion and commercial performance ==
The single was promoted through a combination of online campaigns and offline events. Streaming activity on major platforms such as Spotify and Apple Music reportedly increased within the first 24 hours of release, and the song appeared on several playlists and trending charts. Social media discussion, including interactions by music bloggers and listeners, contributed to the song’s early visibility. On the day after its release, the song was reported to have ranked second on Twitter (X)’s trending chart in Thailand. Live events associated with the release drew audiences and helped expand exposure for the single.

== Reception and significance ==
Commentators noted Lee’s cross-linguistic approach, blending Japanese pop elements with his established musical style. Industry observers have cited the single as an example of artists producing multilingual content to reach international audiences. As Lee’s first original Japanese-language release, the single represents a step in his broader efforts to engage with international markets.
