= Don't Laugh Now =

Studio album by Ray Stevens
- Released: April 1982
- Genres: Country; novelty
- Label: RCA Victor
- Producers: Bob Montgomery, Ray Stevens

Ray Stevens chronology
One More Last Chance (1981)	Don't Laugh Now (1982)	Greatest Hits (1983)

Don't Laugh Now is the nineteenth studio album by Ray Stevens and his third and final for RCA Records, released in 1982. The front of the album cover shows Stevens looking pensive and holding a comedy mask, while the back cover shows Stevens smiling and holding a tragedy mask. Two singles were lifted from the album: "Written Down in My Heart" and "Where the Sun Don't Shine", both of which became minor country hits.

A review in the Bryan-College Station Eagle referred to the album as a "first rate" composition.

== Track listing ==
Side A
No.	Title	Writer(s)	Length
1.	"Such a Night"	Chase	3:30
2.	"Written Down in My Heart"	Davidson	3:04
3.	"Take That Girl Away"	Sharp	2:56
4.	"Always There"	Keith, Snow	3:38
5.	"Where the Sun Don't Shine"	Randy Gilmore, Leath, Sharp	3:15

Side B
No.	Title	Writer(s)	Length
1.	"Oh Leo Lady"	Ray Stevens	3:17
2.	"Don't Laugh Now"	Ray Stevens	4:09
3.	"This Old Piano"	Gray	3:59
4.	"Country Boy, Country Club Girl"	C.W. Kalb, Jr., Harold Ragsdale	3:35
5.	"Why Don't We Go Somewhere and Love"	O'Dell, Henley	2:48

== Personnel ==
- Produced by Bob Montgomery and Ray Stevens
- Tracks 1, 3-7 & 9 arranged by Ray Stevens
- Tracks 2, 8 & 10 arranged by Ron Oates
- Engineer – Stuart Keathley
- Recorded at Ray Stevens Studio (Nashville, Tennessee).
- Mastered at Masterfonics (Nashville, Tennessee).
- Photography – Graham Henman
- Art Direction – Barnes & Company

Musicians

- Ray Stevens – vocals
- Ron Oates – keyboards
- Ken Bell – acoustic guitars
- Larry Byrom – electric guitars
- John Clausi – electric guitars
- Kenny Mims – electric guitars
- Michael Spriggs – electric guitars
- Reggie Young – electric guitars
- Hal Rugg – steel guitar
- Bob Wray – bass
- James Stroud – drums
- Nashville String Machine – strings
- The Cherry Sisters – backing vocals

== Chart performance ==
=== Singles ===
Year	Single	Peak positions
Year	Single	US Country
1982	"Written Down in My Heart"	35
1982	"Where the Sun Don't Shine"	63
