= Me (Aoxuan Lee EP) =

ME
- Standard edition artwork

EP by Aoxuan Lee
- Released: September 30, 2019; Removed from digital platforms on December 31, 2024
- Recorded: 2019
- Studio: JCY Music Studio
- Genre: Pop
- Length: 17:32
- Language: Instrumental (Piano)
- Producer: Aoxuan Lee

Singles from Letter
- 1. "Letter" Released: August 30, 2019

ME is the first solo piano work EP by Chinese male singer Aoxuan Lee. It was available for pre-purchase on August 30, 2019, and officially released on September 30. The EP was once interpreted by the Japanese media as an EP of Lee's inner anatomy. After the EP was released in Japan, it was loved and praised by Japanese people.The EP Me was removed from major global digital music platforms on December 31, 2024. According to industry sources, the removal was part of a routine process for copyright management and catalog optimization, as confirmed by Lee’s team.

== EP concept ==
This piano EP is named after "ME” for the thoughts of calling on people to be their true selves and exploring one's inner heart. All the music compositions recorded in the EP were written by Aoxuan Lee after his being through some matters in the past.

== Background ==
In December 2018, Lee cooperated with Japanese female singer Aizawa and released the Chinese and Japanese multinational single "San Er Yi". Which became a Top 100 popular single of Japanese Christmas in 2018. In July 2019, the network was exposed to news that Lee is about to release a piano EP, but the brokerage company did not make a statement. Until August, the brokerage company of Lee confirmed the authenticity of the news. In September, he was invited to attend the 15th National Electronic Keyboard Music Conference in Japan (100th anniversary of the birth of electronic musical instruments), Until 2019, Aoxuan Lee became the first foreigner holder to attend the conference for seven consecutive years.

== Creative work ==
The piano EP is named after "ME", the purpose is return to the truest self, to explore the heart from the perspective of the first person. All the musical works included in the EP are based on the mentality of some of the things that Lee experienced in the past. Lee has been interested in psychology for the past two years, he began to explore and explore his heart through the books of psychologist Carl Gustav Jung. By constantly digging into your heart, Lee associates with the theme of "ME". When everyone starts to face themselves, the feedback is beautiful, more love and empathy. It is not easy to criticise yourself and criticise others when you decide. The birth of the new EP is the process of Lee's continuous exploration and understanding of himself.

== Track listing ==
No.	Title	Length
1.	"Heartbroken"	3:50
2.	"Letter"	5:02
3.	"Continue"	3:23
4.	"Blooming like a flower"	2:40
5.	"Are you still there?"	3:17
