= Greatest Hits (1983 Ray Stevens album) =

Compilation album by Ray Stevens
- Released: July 1983
- Genres: Country, novelty, comedy
- Label: RCA Victor
- Producer: Ray Stevens

Ray Stevens chronology
Don't Laugh Now (1982)	Greatest Hits (1983)	Me (1983)

Greatest Hits is a collection of ten previously released singles by Ray Stevens, released in 1983 by RCA Records. This collection contains three singles that were released by Monument Records, four by Barnaby Records, and two by RCA. One of the selections is not an original recording; "Ahab the Arab" is a re-recording of Stevens' 1962 hit for Mercury Records that was included on his album Gitarzan, which was released by Monument in 1969. Additionally, there are two selections featured on this collection that are album versions; "Gitarzan" is the album version that begins with cheering and applauding with an audience; "Freddie Feelgood" is the version that contains audience noises and was first featured on the album Gitarzan.

== Track listing ==
Side A
No.	Title	Writer(s)	Length
1.	"The Dooright Family"	Ray Stevens	5:05
2.	"Ahab the Arab"	Ray Stevens	3:32
3.	"The Streak"	Ray Stevens	3:17
4.	"Everything Is Beautiful"	Ray Stevens	3:32
5.	"Mr. Businessman"	Ray Stevens	3:22

Side B
No.	Title	Writer(s)	Length
1.	"The Moonlight Special"	Ray Stevens	5:13
2.	"Misty"	Erroll Garner, Johnny Burke	2:53
3.	"Gitarzan"	Ray Stevens, Bill Everette	3:14
4.	"Freddie Feelgood (And His Funky Little Five Piece Band)"	Ray Stevens	2:49
5.	"Shriner's Convention"	Ray Stevens	5:33

In the cassette version of this album, "The Dooright Family" and "Shriner's Convention" have their track positions switched.

== Album credits ==
- Arranged and Produced by: Ray Stevens
- "Ahab the Arab," "The Streak," "Everything Is Beautiful," "Mr. Businessman," "The Moonlight Special," "Misty," "Gitarzan," "Freddie Feelgood (And His Funky Little Five Piece Band)," under license from Barnaby Records, Inc.
- Remastering Engineer: Bill Vandevort, Music City Music Hall, Nashville, TN
- Disc Mastering Engineer: Randy Kling, Disc Mastering, Inc. (Randy's Roost), Nashville, TN
- Art Direction: Herb Burnette, Pinwheel Studios, Nashville, TN
- Photography: Graham Henman

== Chart performance ==
Chart (1980)	Peak position
U.S. Billboard Top Country Albums	67
