= Judith Pipher =

American astrophysicist and observational astronomer (1940–2022)

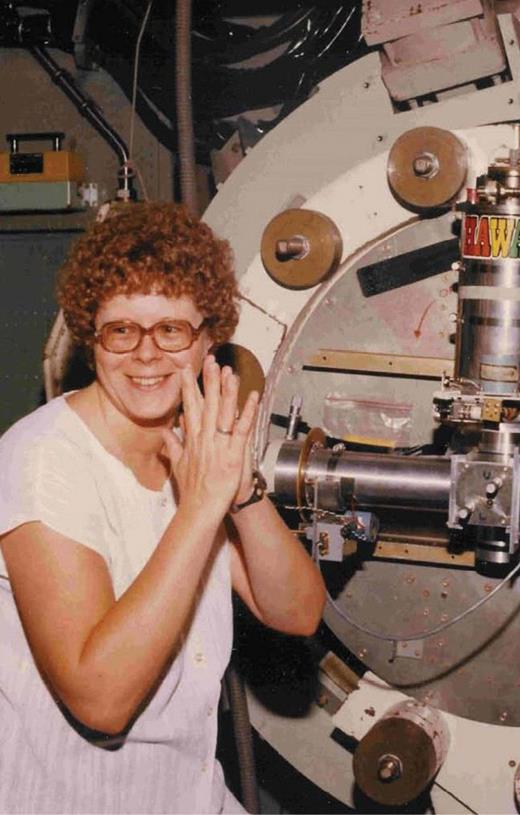
- Born: Judith Lynn Bancroft; June 18, 1940; Toronto, Ontario, Canada
- Died: February 21, 2022 (aged 81); Seneca Falls, New York, U.S.
- Education: University of Toronto; Cornell University
- Known for: Developing infrared detector arrays
- Spouse: Robert E. Pipher (m. 1965; died 2007)
- Awards: Susan B. Anthony Lifetime Achievement Award (2002); National Women's Hall of Fame (2007)
- Scientific career
- Fields: Infrared astronomy, submillimeter astronomy, observational astronomy
- Workplaces: University of Rochester
- Thesis: Rocket Submillimeter Observations of the Galaxy and Background (1971)
- Doctoral advisor: Martin Harwit

Judith Lynn Pipher (née Bancroft, June 18, 1940 – February 21, 2022) was a Canadian-born American astrophysicist and observational astronomer. She was Professor Emerita of Astronomy at the University of Rochester and directed the C. E. K. Mees Observatory from 1979 to 1994. She made important contributions to the development of infrared detector arrays in space telescopes.

== Early life and education ==
Judith Lynn Bancroft was born on June 18, 1940, in Toronto, Ontario, to Earl Lester Alexander Bancroft and Agnes May Kathleen (née McGowan) Bancroft. She was named Junior Miss Homemaker of Ontario when she was sixteen years old. She graduated from Leaside High School in 1958 and earned a B.A. in astronomy from the University of Toronto in 1962. Following her graduation, she moved to the Finger Lakes region of upstate New York where she taught science and attended Cornell University. In the late 1960s, she worked as a graduate student of Martin Harwit on a cryogenic rocket telescope experiment. She received her Ph.D from Cornell in 1971. Her dissertation, Rocket Submillimeter Observations of the Galaxy and Background, led her into research in the nascent fields of submillimeter and infrared astronomy.

== Career and research ==
Pipher joined the faculty of the University of Rochester's Physics and Astronomy Department in 1971 as an Instructor. From 1979 to 1994, Pipher was director of University of Rochester's C. E. K. Mees Observatory. In the 1970s and 1980s, she made observations from the Kuiper Airborne Observatory. Pipher and William J. Forrest achieved promising results with a 32×32-pixel array of indium antimonide (InSb) detectors at a NASA Ames workshop. They reported their results in 1983. That year Pipher and her colleagues were among the first to use an infrared array camera to capture starburst galaxies.

For the next two decades, Pipher developed ultra-sensitive infrared InSb arrays with the help of colleague William J. Forrest. The Infrared Array Camera (IRAC) for the Spitzer Space Telescope was launched in August 2003. She also worked with Dan Watson and on the development of mercury cadmium telluride (HgCdTe) arrays. Pipher's observational research concentrated on star formation studies and the arrays she designed have been used to observe astronomical phenomena such as planetary nebulae, brown dwarfs, and the Galactic Center. She authored over 200 papers and scientific articles.

Pipher was a member of a team at the University of Rochester that developed the NEOCam sensor, a HgCdTe infrared-light sensor intended for the proposed Near-Earth Object Camera. The sensor improves the ability to detect potentially hazardous objects such as asteroids.

== Honors and awards ==
Pipher received the Susan B. Anthony Lifetime Achievement Award from the University of Rochester in 2002. She was inducted into the National Women's Hall of Fame in 2007 and became involved with its administration. A 2009 article in Discover magazine indicated that Pipher was "considered by many to be the mother of infrared astronomy." Asteroid 306128 Pipher was named in her honor. The official naming citation was published by the Minor Planet Center on January 31, 2018 (M.P.C. 108698).

She was elected a Legacy Fellow of the American Astronomical Society in 2020.

== Personal life and death ==
While at Cornell, Judith met Robert E. Pipher (1934–2007), who brought her four stepchildren when the couple married in 1965. The Piphers lived at Cayuga Lake in Seneca Falls, New York, where she was vice president of the Seneca Museum board of directors. On the occasion of her 80th birthday, June 18, 2020, was proclaimed to be "Dr. Judy Pipher Day" in the Town of Seneca Falls. She died on February 21, 2022, at the age of 81.
