= Self (disambiguation) =

The self (pl.: selves) is an individual person as the object of their own reflective consciousness.

Self may also refer to:

== Arts ==
- Self (album), by Quintessence
- Self (band), an American pop rock band
- Self (film), a short film by Pixar
- Self (novel), a 1996 Canadian novel
- Self (sculpture), an ongoing art project
- Self Incorporated, a 1975 instructional television series on PBS
- Self, an album by Paul Kalkbrenner
- "Self", a song by Zager & Evans from the album 2525 (Exordium & Terminus)
- "Self", a song by Fuzzbox from the album Big Bang!
- "Self-" a song by Will Wood and the Tapeworms from the album Self-ish

== Technology and science ==
- Self (company), a Swedish motor vehicle manufacturer
- self (computer science), a keyword in many object-oriented programming languages
- Self (programming language), an object-oriented programming language based on the concept of prototypes
- Solar Electric Light Fund (SELF), an international development aid organization
- SouthEast LinuxFest(SELF), an annual Linux and open source software conference held in the Southeast United States

== Other uses ==
- Psychology of self
- Self (magazine), an American women's magazine
- Self (surname), a surname
- Self, Arkansas, an unincorporated community

== See also ==
- Selves (disambiguation)
- Virtual self (disambiguation)
