= He Thinks He's Ray Stevens =

Studio album by Ray Stevens
- Released: November 1984
- Studios: Ray Stevens Studio (Nashville, Tennessee)
- Genres: Novelty, country
- Length: 35:28
- Label: MCA Records
- Producer: Ray Stevens

Ray Stevens chronology
Me (1983)	He Thinks He's Ray Stevens (1984)	Ray Stevens Collection (1984)

He Thinks He's Ray Stevens is the twenty-first studio album by Ray Stevens and his first for MCA Records, released in 1984. The front of the album cover shows Stevens spoofing French emperor Napoleon Bonaparte. It was recorded in an effort to reestablish Stevens as a comic singer after a period in the early 1980s when he had focused mainly on serious material.

The track "Mississippi Squirrel Revival" was the biggest hit from this album, reaching No. 20 on Hot Country Singles (now Hot Country Songs) in early 1985. Stevens uses comic storytelling to frame what occurs when a young adolescent boy catches a squirrel (while visiting his grandmother in Pascagoula, Mississippi), brings it into church, where several self-righteous members – including one in particular with sinful secrets to hide – are prominent members, and the squirrel breaks loose from a box the boy has kept it in. As the squirrel wreaks havoc, several members admit to their fellow congregation members their faults, and by song's end they all make a vow to change.

"Furthermore" is a re-recording and partial rewrite of Stevens' 1962 single of the same name, this time done as a more serious down-tempo country music piece. "The Monkees (Theme From)" is a cover of the theme song to The Monkees but sung by Ray in broad German dialects under the guise of two fictional singers, Wolfgang and Fritzy. "It's Me Again, Margaret" is a cover of a Paul Craft song about an obscene phone caller. "Ned Nostril" is a parody of Johnny Cash and borrows motifs from Cash's "I Walk the Line" and "Folsom Prison Blues"; the song gets regular airplay on the WDEV novelty showcase Music to Go to the Dump By. "Erik the Awful" is done in the style of Stevens's earlier hit, "Ahab the Arab", with a Viking marauder as the subject. "Happy Hour" is a somewhat more serious number in which a couple who had lots of fun when drunk, but when the other partner sobers up and recognizes their self-destructive behavior, he remains in denial about his problem; Stevens plays the songs for laughs, such as (in video performances) putting on clown makeup as he sings.

The album was re-released on Cassette Tape and CD on August 15, 1992 (MCAC/MCAD-20688), titled Mississippi Squirrel Revival. The cassette featured this album's first eight tracks in a different order, whereas the CD contained all 10 of this album's songs and in the same order as on this album.

== Track listing ==
Side 1
No.	Title	Writer(s)	Length
1.	"I'm Kissin' You Goodbye"	Ray Stevens	3:09
2.	"It's Me Again, Margaret"	Paul Craft	3:26
3.	"Mississippi Squirrel Revival"	Cyrus "Buddy" Kalb, Carlene Kalb	3:42
4.	"Ned Nostril (And His South Seas Paradise, Puts Your Blues on Ice, Cheap at Twice the Price Band — Ikky-Ikky, Ukky-Ukky)"	Stevens	4:11
5.	"Fred"	Lee Cheney	2:40
Total length:			17:08

Side 2
No.	Title	Writer(s)	Length
1.	"Erik the Awful"	B. Calb, C. Kalb, Stevens	4:35
2.	"The Monkees (Theme From)"	Tommy Boyce, Bobby Hart	3:09
3.	"Joggin'"	B. Calb, C. Calb	3:39
4.	"Happy Hour (Is the Saddest Time of the Day)"	Mike Neun	4:05
5.	"Furthermore"	Stevens	2:52
Total length:			18:20

== Personnel ==
- Ray Stevens – lead vocals, backing vocals (1–9), keyboards and synthesizers (1, 2, 3, 5–9)
- Rodger Morris – keyboards and synthesizers (4, 10)
- Mark Casstevens – rhythm guitars
- Steve Gibson – electric guitars, banjo, dobro
- Stuart Keathley – bass
- Jack Williams – bass
- Jerry Carrigan – drums (1, 2, 3, 5–10)
- James Stroud – drums (4)
- Terry McMillan – harmonica
- Lisa Silver – fiddle, backing vocals
- The Nashville String Machine – strings
- Diane Tidwell – backing vocals
- Wendy Suits – backing vocals (1–9)
- Sheri Huffman – backing vocals (10)
- Alan Moore – backing vocals (10)
- Hurshel Wiginton – backing vocals (10)

== Production ==
- Ray Stevens – producer, arrangements
- Stuart Keathley – engineer
- Jeff Adamoff – art direction
- Bill Brunt – graphics
- Slick Lawson – photography
- Susan Scott – photo coordinator
- Recorded at Ray Stevens Studio (Nashville, TN).
- Mastered at Masterfonics (Nashville, TN).

== Charts ==
=== Weekly charts ===
Chart (1984–1985)	Peak position
US Billboard 200	118
US Top Country Albums (Billboard)	3

=== Year-end charts ===
Chart (1985)	Position
US Top Country Albums (Billboard)	26

=== Singles ===
Year	Single	Peak positions	
Year	Single	US Country	CAN Country
1985	"Mississippi Squirrel Revival"	20	32
1985	"It's Me Again, Margaret"	74	—
