= Les Mées =

Les Mées may refer to the following places in France:

- Les Mées, Alpes-de-Haute-Provence, a commune in the Alpes-de-Haute-Provence department
  - Canton of Les Mées, defunct
- Les Mées, Sarthe, a commune in the Sarthe department
