= Pronouns in German =

Words in German that substitute for a noun or noun phrase

German pronouns are German words that function as pronouns. As with pronouns in other languages, they are frequently employed as the subject or object of a clause, acting as substitutes for nouns or noun phrases, but are also used in relative clauses to relate the main clause to a subordinate one.

== Classification and usage ==
Germanic pronouns are divided into several groups;

- Personal pronouns, which apply to an entity, such as the speaker or third parties;
- Possessive pronouns, which describe ownership of objects, institutions, etc.;
- Demonstrative pronouns;
  - Determinative pronouns;
- Reflexive pronouns, in which the subject is also one of the objects;
- Relative pronouns, which connect clauses;
- Interrogative pronouns, which are used in questions, such as who?;
- Indefinite pronouns, which denote entities of quantities.

With few exceptions, German pronouns must always have the same gender, same number, and same case as their antecedents.

In German, a pronoun may have a certain position in the sentence under special circumstances. First and second person pronouns usually do not, and they can be used anywhere in the sentence—except in certain poetical or informal contexts.

Das im Schrank (the thing in the cupboard)
Das auf dem Tisch (the thing on the table)

There are also genitive direct objects. But the genitive object, other than accusative or dative objects, is somewhat outdated:

OLD: Ich erinnere mich ihrer (MODERN: Ich erinnere mich an sie.) (I remember her.)
OLD: Ich erinnere mich seiner (MODERN: Ich erinnere mich an ihn.)
OLD: Ich entsinne mich ihrer (MODERN: Ich erinnere mich an sie.)

In Modern German, erinnern rather takes the prepositional phrase with the preposition an. However, some verbs cannot be constructed otherwise, and thus genitive objects remain common language to some degree. This is true for entsinnen (which is archaic in itself), but also for sentences such as:

OLD AND MODERN: Lasst uns der Opfer gedenken. (Let us commemorate the victims.)
OLD AND MODERN: Ich klage Herrn Max Mustermann des Mordes an. (I accuse Mr. John Doe of murder.)

The two noun and pronoun emphasizers selber and selbst have slightly different meanings than if used with nominal phrases. They normally emphasize the pronoun, but if they are applied to a reflexive pronoun (in the objective case), they emphasize its reflexive meaning.

=== Personal pronouns ===
	Singular					Plural			Formal (singular and plural)
Case	First Person	Second Person	Third Person			First Person	Second Person	Third Person	Second Person
(English nominative)	I	you (thou)	he	it (null)	she	we	you (ye)	they	you
Nominative (subject)	ich	du	er	es	sie	wir	ihr	sie	Sie
Accusative (direct object)	mich	dich	ihn	es	sie	uns	euch	sie	Sie
Dative (indirect object)	mir	dir	ihm		ihr	uns	euch	ihnen	Ihnen
Genitive	meiner (mein)	deiner (dein)	seiner (sein)		ihrer	unser	euer	ihrer	Ihrer

The verbs following the formal form of "you"—"Sie"—are conjugated identically as in the third-person plurals. For example, "Sie sprechen Deutsch." This means either "You speak German" or "They speak German", and it is completely up to the context to determine which one it is. "Sie spricht Deutsch." is third person female; this is shown by the change of "en" to "t" in the action (i.e., "sprechen" vs. "spricht"), not context.

"Wann ist dein Geburtstag?" – "Er ist morgen." (When is your birthday? – It is tomorrow. Overliterally: He is tomorrow.)
"Ich rufe den Hund" – "Ich rufe ihn." (I am calling the dog – I am calling it. Overliterally: I am calling him.)

The first of these is an example of gender-based pronoun usage that may not be intuitive to an English speaker because in English an inanimate object is almost always referenced by the pronoun "it." In German, nouns always have a relevant gender to consider. In the above examples, both birthday and dog are masculine, so "it" becomes "er" in the nominative case and "ihn" in accusative.

Genitive personal pronouns (not to be confused with other instances of the genitive case such as "des"—see below) are sometimes explained as indicating possession; however, this is incorrect and redundant, as the definition of a possessive pronoun (mein) is already to indicate possession. For example, my book translates to "mein Buch", or "das Buch von mir" (the latter an alternate formulation translated literally as the book from/of me), and never "das Buch meiner".

The genitive personal pronouns in the table above seldom find use in modern German and are nearly always made obsolete by modern formulations. There is a well-known German saying "Der Dativ ist dem Genitiv sein Tod" (The dative case is the death of the genitive case), referring to the frequent colloquial replacement of traditionally genitive formulations with dative formulations (e.g. "statt mir" instead of "statt meiner"). Genitive personal pronouns may be used for the genitive object ("gedenke meiner": commemorate me). Archaically, the pronoun form without -er can be used, e.g. Vergissmeinnicht (instead of: "vergiss meiner nicht" or—vergessen takes the accusative as well—"vergiss mich nicht" in more modern form). Another use is after prepositions requiring the genitive case, e.g. "seitens meiner" ("on my part", more typically "meinerseits").

=== Possessive pronouns ===
Possessive pronouns are formed by adding endings to the genitive case of the personal pronoun, eventually stripping it of its genitive ending. The endings are identical to those of the indefinite article ein.

Uninflected forms
	m., n. sg.	f. sg.	pl.	courtesy
1st person	mein		unser	
2nd person	dein		euer	Ihr
3rd person	sein	ihr	ihr	

Example: mein (my)
	Masculine	Neuter	Feminine	Plurals
Nominative	mein	mein	meine	meine
Accusative	meinen	mein	meine	meine
Dative	meinem	meinem	meiner	meinen
Genitive	meines	meines	meiner	meiner

Note: when euer gets a suffix the "-er"-ending is reduced to "-r": eure, eurem etc.

=== Reflexive pronouns ===
There are also reflexive pronouns for the dative case and the accusative case (reflexive pronouns for the genitive case are possessive pronouns with a "selbst" following after them). In the first and second person, they are the same as the normal pronouns, but they only become visible in the third person singular and plural. The third person reflexive pronoun for both plural and singular is: "sich":

"Er liebt sich". (He loves himself.)
"Sie verstecken sich". (They hide themselves.)

Reflexive pronouns can be used not only for personal pronouns:

"Sie hat sich ein Bild gekauft." (She bought herself a picture.)
"Seiner ist schon kaputt." (His is already broken.)

=== Relative pronouns ===
A relative clause contains a relative pronoun. The relative clause is used when there is further information to express. The relative pronouns are as follows:

	Masculine	Neuter	Feminine	Plural
Nominative	der	das	die	die
Accusative	den	das	die	die
Dative	dem	dem	der	denen
Genitive	dessen	dessen	deren	deren

Instead, welcher (-e, -es) may be used, which is seen to be more formal, and only common in interdependent multi-relative clauses, or as a mnemonic to German pupils to learn to distinguish das from dass (it is the first of these if one can say dieses, jenes or welches instead). The relative pronoun is never omitted in German. On the other hand, in English, the phrase

The young woman I invited for coffee yesterday is my cousin's fiancée.

completely omits the use of a relative pronoun. (The use of the relative pronouns "who" or "that" is optional in sentences like these.) To state such a thing in German, one would say

Die junge Frau, die ich gestern zum Kaffee eingeladen habe, ist die Verlobte meines Cousins.

The conjugated verb is placed at the end of German relative clauses. This was the preferable use in Latin sentences as well as in Old High German even for main clauses, and remains intact for subclauses, whereas in main clauses the verb takes the second place. (Exceptions: jokes begin with the verb: "Treffen sich zwei Freunde. Kommt einer nicht." which might be translated in a way such as this: Meeting two friends. Coming one fails to do. In family event lyrics, the old custom may be revived for the sake of forced rhyme, e.g. "Mein Onkel ist der beste Mann / und ich dies auch begründen kann." My uncle is right best a man / a thing that really prove I can.)

Likewise, an English participle such as

The man coming round the corner is a thief.

is best translated to a relative clause, e.g.

Der Mann, der gerade um die Ecke kommt, ist ein Dieb.

However, it might be translated literally which would result in what some call a very German sentence, e.g.

Der gerade um die Ecke kommende Mann ist ein Dieb.

==== Comparison to the definite article ====
Although the pronoun form and the define article form are the same in most cases, there are sometimes differences.

The German definite article:

	Masculine	Neuter	Feminine	Plural
Nominative	der	das	die	die
Accusative	den	das	die	die
Dative	dem	dem	der	den
Genitive	des	des	der	der

The German indicative pronouns derived from the definite articles:

	Masculine	Neuter	Feminine	Plural
Nominative	der	das	die	die
Accusative	den	das	die	die
Dative	dem	dem	der	denen
Genitive	dessen	dessen	deren	deren/derer

Derer is to be used only for remarking an antecedent it follows.

=== Demonstrative pronouns ===
Demonstrative pronouns are used to refer to something already defined.

jener, -e, -es (that, the former)
dieser, -e, -es (this, the latter) (or "dies" as abbreviation for dieses)
ersterer, -e, -es (the former)
letzterer, -e, -es (the latter)

all decline

derjenige, diejenige, dasjenige (the one)

Declined like [def. art] + [jenig-] + weak adj. ending

Used to identify a noun to be further identified in a relative clause.

derselbe, dieselbe, dasselbe (the same)

Declined like [def. art] + [selb-] + weak adj. ending

Used to indicate an identity stronger than der gleiche ("the equal") would. However, the derselbe / der gleiche distinction is not present in all varieties of German.

They follow the format:

	Masculine	Neuter	Feminine	Plural
Nominative	dieser	dieses	diese	diese
Accusative	diesen	dieses	diese	diese
Dative	diesem	diesem	dieser	diesen
Genitive	dieses	dieses	dieser	dieser

=== Interrogative pronouns ===
In German, there are the interrogative pronouns. Most of them have a direct English equivalent:

"Wer?" Who?

"Was?" What?

"Welch" (which) is declined by gender and case.
