= Buck Brothers =

UK musical group

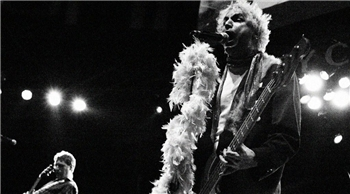

Background information
- Origin: London, England/ Jersey, Channel Islands
- Genres: Pop punk, alternative rock
- Years active: 2005–2011
- Members: Andy Duke; Craig Welsh; Dom "Becksi" Beckford
- Website: www.buckbrothers.net www.topbuzzer.co.uk

Buck Brothers were a British three piece rock band. The band's sound is a mixture of pop and punk.

== History ==
Buck Brothers formed early in 2005 via a chance meeting at the unlikely location of a Buddhist Disco in North London.

None of the members are actually called Buck or are Brothers. The band claim to be named after an adult film company that guitarist Dom used to work for before joining the band. *Although the band were based in London, guitarist Dom and drummer Craig, are from the Island of Jersey.

The trio gained international media attention for successfully breaking a world record for the "highest number of gigs performed in a 12 hour period" on March 5, 2007 to mark the release of the band's debut album Me in the UK and North America on Cargo Records and Scratch Records respectively. The band performed 28 gigs in 10.5 hours, beating the previous Guinness World Record (held by Hamburg band Kansas) by two shows.

On July 7, 2007, Buck Brothers supported Primal Scream at Столпотворени Music Festival in Moscow.

The band's debut album Me entered the CMJ Top 200 Music Chart in the USA in October 2007 with "Girls, Skirts, Boots, Bikes" also making an impact on commercial radio placing at number seven in the national commercial specialty radio chart two months later.

The band toured North America in March 2008 including three performances at SXSW (South By South West) in Austin, Texas including an unlikely support slot for UK rapper Dizzee Rascal. Rodney Bingenheimer, legendary DJ from KROQ-FM and big supporter of the band, introduced the trio at the first date on this tour in Los Angeles. This is the first time he had introduced a band in over three years.

In May 2008, the band made their USA live television debut on Fearless Music, a New York City based television show airing on the Fox 5 network in New York and syndicated on other networks throughout the states.

In August 2008, the trio supported US pop punkers Goldfinger on their UK tour.

The band have performed at NXNE Festival in Toronto, Canada twice (2006 and 2007), In the City Festival in Manchester, UK twice (2006 and 2007) and made their debut at SXSW Festival in Austin, Texas in March 2008. January–February 2009 saw Buck Brothers tour Italy for the first time following the release of "Me" on the Red Pony label there. In May of that year, Buck Brothers made two appearances at International Pop Overthrow Festival in Liverpool, England including a show at the legendary Cavern Club. Following incessant touring in the UK, the trio were invited in August to appear on the main stage at Booch Festival in the Netherlands. In August 2010, they headlined Worcester Music Festival in England. In that same month, Detroit label Static Records signed the band stateside.

2010 saw the release of their long-awaited second album "We Are Merely Filters" gaining a new fan along the way in the name of Marky Ramone after playing the band's track "All I Want To Do" on his national (USA) Sirius FM radio show "Punk Rock Blitzkrieg".

Due to conflicts with companies in the US regarding the band's name and numerous line up changes over the years, 2011 saw the group change their title to Top Buzzer.

== Members ==
- Andy Duke - Vocals and bass (2005–2011)
- Craig Welsh - Drums and vocals (August 2007 – 2011)
- Dom Beckford - Guitar and vocals (May 2008 – 2011)

=== Former touring members ===
- Gavin "Gee Rouge" Thomas - Guitar and vocals (2010)
- Dave "Golden" Stirrup - Guitar and vocals (US tour 2008)

=== Former members ===
- Pete "Per" Sellers - Guitar and vocals (2005–2008)
- Axel Brugger - Drums (May–July 2007)
- Horatio Agar - Drums (Jan-May 2007)
- Alice Brian Jones Bones - Drums (2005–2007)
- Jack Gillis - Drums (2005)
- Tom Davis - Drums (2005)

== Back2Forward Records ==
Due to the band's DIY ethos, they set up their own record label "Back2Forward Records" so they could release all their material when and where they wanted. Back2Forward also released an album by Canadian band Broomfiller.

== Discography ==
=== Albums ===
- Me - Back2Forward - Coach House Records (USA), Scratch Records (Canada), Cargo (UK) (2007), The Orchard (all digital retailers)
- We Are Merely Filters Static Records (USA/Canada) - Back2Forward (UK/Europe)/The Orchard (digitally released April 5, 2010), Cargo (physically released June 28, 2010)

=== Singles ===
- "Pop Muzik (UK Album Version Mix)" - Back2Forward/The Orchard (Released April 12, 2010)
- "You're So Good, Good, Good You're Great" - Back2Forward/The Orchard (Released July 13, 2009)
- "When I Look At You (All I Think About Is Sex)" - Back2Forward/The Orchard (Released June 1, 2009)
- "Pop Muzik" - Coach House Records/The Orchard (2008)
- "She's Red" - Coach House Records/The Orchard (2008)
- "Girls, Skirts, Boots, Bikes" - Coach House Records/The Orchard (2007)

== Awards ==
- Southern California Music Awards (USA) - 2006 (Best International Artist Nomination)
- Orange County Music Awards (USA) - 2006 (Best International Artist Nomination)
- Toronto Independent Music Awards (Canada) - 2005 & 2006 (Best International Artist Nomination)

== Television appearances ==
- ITN News (UK) - Buck Brothers were featured while performing their successful world record attempt for "the most gigs performed in 12 hours". The interview/feature aired on 5 March 2007.
- In May 2008, the band made their live television debut on Fearless Music in the USA performing "Girls, Skirts, Boots, Bikes". Video
- In May 2010, the band were featured and interviewed on BBC Jersey News.
