= Himself (disambiguation) =

Himself is a reflexive pronoun in English.

Himself may also refer to:

- Himself (Bill Cosby album), a 1982 comedy album
  - Bill Cosby: Himself, a 1983 stand-up comedy film
- Himself (Gilbert O'Sullivan album), 1971
- Himself (Akinori Nakagawa album)
- Intensive pronoun
