= Mee (crater) =

Impact crater on the Moon

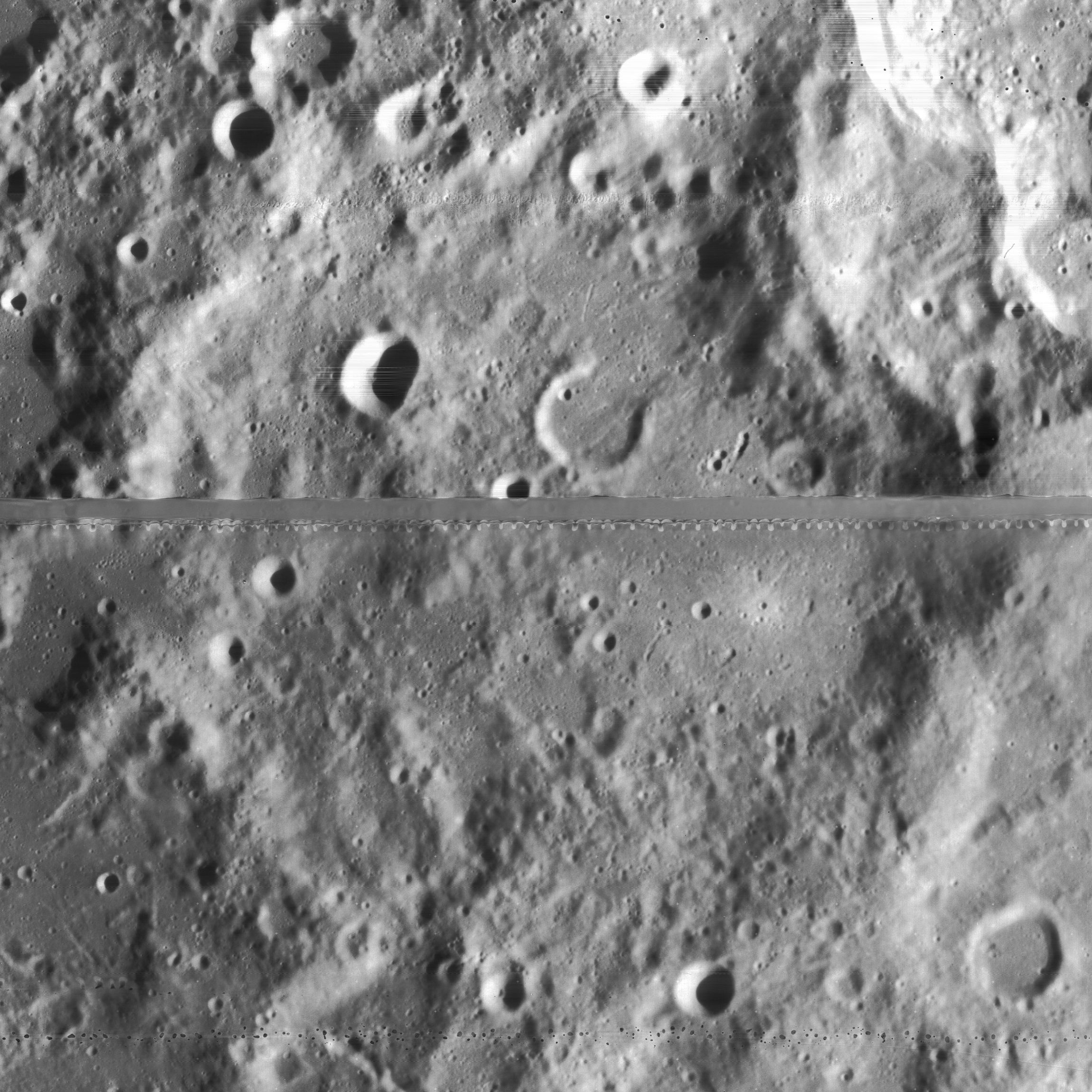
- Lunar Orbiter 4 image
- Coordinates: 43.7°S 35.0°W
- Diameter: 132 km
- Depth: 2.7 km
- Colongitude: 36° at sunrise
- Eponym: Arthur B. P. Mee

Mee is a lunar impact crater in the southwestern part of the Moon's near side. Overlying the northwestern rim and intruding one-third the distance across the interior floor is Hainzel, a merged triple-crater formation. To the south is the highly elongated crater Schiller. Mee is 132 kilometers in diameter and 2.7 kilometers deep. It is from the Pre-Nectarian period, 4.55 to 3.92 billion years ago.

This is an old crater formation with an outer rim that has been heavily eroded by subsequent impacts, leaving an irregular impression of the crater rim. The inner wall is notched an indented by multiple small craters, with the most recent being Mee F along the northwestern side. Portions of the interior are relatively level, and there is a palimpsest, Mee E, in the northwestern part of the floor. A tiny crater with a high albedo halo is located in the eastern part of the floor.

The crater is named after the 19th-century Scottish astronomer Arthur Butler Phillips Mee.

== Satellite craters ==
By convention these features are identified on lunar maps by placing the letter on the side of the crater midpoint that is closest to Mee.

Mee	Latitude	Longitude	Diameter
A	44.4° S	29.1° W	14 km
B	44.6° S	31.1° W	15 km
C	45.3° S	28.7° W	13 km
D	45.3° S	32.9° W	9 km
E	43.0° S	35.3° W	16 km
F	43.3° S	36.7° W	12 km
G	45.5° S	40.7° W	23 km
H	44.1° S	39.4° W	48 km
J	44.5° S	40.6° W	10 km
K	44.4° S	41.6° W	9 km
L	44.0° S	41.5° W	8 km
M	45.8° S	29.1° W	8 km
N	45.2° S	42.2° W	6 km
P	45.9° S	30.0° W	14 km
Q	43.6° S	33.9° W	1 km
R	44.0° S	43.4° W	10 km
S	43.2° S	41.0° W	12 km
T	42.5° S	38.2° W	9 km
U	42.8° S	33.9° W	8 km
V	45.5° S	42.4° W	7 km
W	43.6° S	35.5° W	5 km
X	41.5° S	36.0° W	7 km
Y	44.3° S	36.8° W	7 km
Z	44.7° S	42.6° W	12 km
