= Kenneth Mees =

British physicist and founder of the Eastman Kodak Research Laboratories

Kenneth Mees FRS
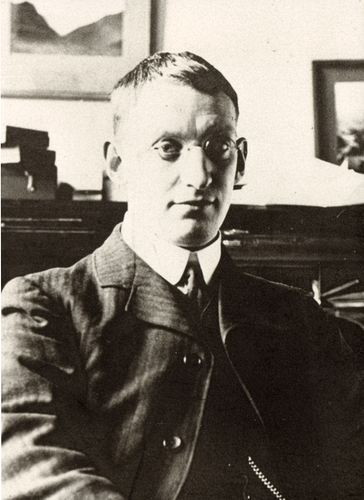
- Portrait of Mees, c. 1912
- Born: Charles Edward Kenneth Mees; May 26, 1882; Wellingborough, England, United Kingdom of Great Britain and Ireland
- Died: August 15, 1960 (aged 78); Honolulu, Hawaii, United States
- Education: University of London
- Employer: Eastman Kodak
- Spouse: Alice Crisp (m. 1909–1954)
- Children: 2

Charles Edward Kenneth Mees FRS (26 May 1882 – 15 August 1960) was a British scientist and photographic researcher.

== Early life and education ==
Mees was born in Wellingborough, England, the son of a Wesleyan minister.

He attended the University of London. In 1906 he was awarded his D.Sc. with a dissertation on photographic theory.

== Career ==
From 1906 until 1912, Mees worked for Wratten and Wainwright, Ltd., assisting Frederick Wratten in developing the first panchromatic photographic plates, as well as light filters and safelights for the darkroom.

In 1912, Eastman Kodak Company acquired Wratten and Wainwright because they were interested in the skills Mees provided. George Eastman convinced Mees to move to Rochester, New York, United States, where Mees created the Kodak Research Laboratories, becoming its first director.

Mees helped the US military in World War I in its instruction of photography. After the attack on Pearl Harbor, Mees became an American citizen so that he could have access to high security war projects and information during World War II.

Later, he was named vice president in charge of Research and Development for Eastman Kodak; he remained at that position until he retired in 1955.

During his career, he published 100 scientific papers and 60 other works. Among his accomplishments was the development of sensitive photographic emulsions for use in astronomy. He also delivered the 1935 Royal Institution Christmas Lectures on Photography.

Mees served as the first president of the board of trustees of George Eastman House from 1947 until 1954.

He died suddenly in Honolulu in 1960.

== Personal life ==
He married in 1909 Alice Crisp, and together they raised two children: Graham (1910) and Doris (1912). They were married for 45 years.

In 1951 he suffered a massive thrombosis in one leg and lost it to amputation. Despite that, he became adept at using an artificial limb and even managed to drive his own car.

== Selected works ==
- C.E. Kenneth Mees, An Atlas of Absorption Spectra, 1909.
- C.E. Kenneth Mees, The Photography of Colored Objects, 1909.
- C.E. Kenneth Mees, F. M. Hamer and L. G. S. Brooker. Recent advances in sensitizers for the photography of the infrared. J. Opt. Soc. Am., 23:216., 1933
- C.E. Kenneth Mees, Photography, Macmillan Co., New York, 1942.
- C.E. Kenneth Mees, The Theory of the Photographic Process, Macmillan Co., New York, 1942.
- C.E. Kenneth Mees & S. Sheppard, Investigations on the Theory of the Photographic Process.
- C.E. Kenneth Mees, The Path of Science, J. Wiley & sons, inc., 1946.
- C.E. Kenneth Mees and John A. Leermakers, The Organization of Industrial Scientific Research, McGraw-Hill, 1950.
- C.E. Kenneth Mees, From dry plates to Ektachrome film: a story of photographic research, Ziff-Davis Pub. Co., 1961.

== Awards and honors ==
- Progress Medal, Royal Photographic Society, Great Britain, 1912 and 1952
- Hurter and Driffield Medal, 1924
- Henry Draper Medal, National Academy of Sciences, 1936.
- Progress Medal, Society of Motion Picture and Television Engineers, 1936
- Member of the American Philosophical Society, 1937
- Member of the American Academy of Arts and Sciences, 1941
- Member of the United States National Academy of Sciences, 1950
- Franklin Medal, 1954
- Fellow of the Royal Photographic Society
- Fellow of the Royal Society, 1939
- Inductee, International Photography Hall of Fame, 1972
- Honorary Member of the Optical Society of America, 1957

== Legacy ==
- The C. E. K. Mees Award is the highest research honor given by Kodak.
- The C. E. K. Mees Medal, awarded in odd-numbered years by the Optical Society of America, is named after him and was endowed by the Mees family. It has been rewarded annually since 2017.
- The University of Rochester's C. E. K. Mees Observatory is named after him.
- The crater Mees on the Moon is named after him.
- Mees Solar Observatory on the summit of Haleakala is named after him.
