= Me (Buck Brothers album) =

Studio album by Buck Brothers
- Released: March 2007 (UK); October 2007 (US)
- Recorded: 2005–2006
- Genre: Pop; Punk
- Length: 33:48
- Producer: Phil E. Warren

Buck Brothers chronology
Me (2007)	We Are Merely Filters (2009)

Professional ratings
Review scores
Source	Rating
AllMusic	4.5/5 stars

Me is the debut album by London-based band Buck Brothers, released in the United Kingdom in March 2007 and the United States in October 2007. On 5 March 2007, to commemorate the album's UK release, the band broke the Guinness World Record for the "most gigs performed in 12 hours".

In October 2007, the album entered the CMJ Top 200 chart in the United States.

== Track listing ==
1. "Run, Run, Run"
2. "Gorgeously Stupid"
3. "Which Me Do You Like?"
4. "Mannish Girl"
5. "Liar"
6. "Together We Fall"
7. "Girls, Skirts, Boots, Bikes"
8. "One Day I'll Say It"
9. "Yes, No, Stay, Go, Do, Don't, Will, Won't"
10. "Gatu Politik"
11. "Wake Up Call"
12. "She's Red"
