= Me, Myself, and I =

Me, Myself, and I may refer to:

== Songs ==
- "Me, Myself and I" (1937 song), performed by Billie Holiday
- "Me Myself & I" (5 Seconds of Summer song), 2022
- "Me, Myself & I" (Blonde song), 2018, featuring Bryn Christopher
- "Me, Myself & I" (Chalk Circle song), 1986
- "Me, Myself & I" (G-Eazy and Bebe Rexha song), 2015
- "Me, Myself & I" (Scandal'us song), 2001
- "Me, Myself & I" (Jive Jones song), 2001
- "Me, Myself and I" (Beyoncé song), 2003
- "Me Myself and I" (De La Soul song), 1989
- "Me, Myself and I" (Vitamin C song), 1999
- "Me Myself I" (song), by Joan Armatrading, 1980
- "Me, Myself and (I)", by Darren Hayes, 2007
- "Me, Myself & I", a single by Mae Muller from her 2023 album Sorry I'm Late
- "Me, Myself & I", a song by Nikki Yanofsky from her 2016 EP Solid Gold

== Albums ==
- Me, Myself, and I, a 2013 album by Michelle Chen
- Me Myself and I, a 1993 album by Cheryl Pepsii Riley, or the title track
- Me, Myself & I (album), a 2006 album by Fat Joe
- Me, Myself + I, a 2001 album by Jive Jones, or the title track
- Me Myself I, a 1980 album by Joan Armatrading

== Films and plays ==
- Me, Myself and I (play), a 2007 play by Edward Albee
- Me Myself & I (film), a 1992 film by Pablo Ferro
- Me Myself I (film), a 2000 film by Pip Karmel
- Corey Haim: Me, Myself, and I, a 1989 promotional film about Corey Haim

== Other ==
- Me, Myself & I (TV series), an American television sitcom
- Me, Myself & I, a catalog collecting art by Bruno Peinado, made by Sylvia Tournerie

== See also ==
- "I / Me / Myself", a song by Will Wood from his 2020 album The Normal Album
- I Myself and Me, a 1992 album by Pernilla Wahlgren
- Me, Myself & Irene, a 2000 film by Peter Farrelly and Bobby Farrelly
