= Virtual self =

A virtual self is a virtual concept of self in philosophy, sociology and artificial intelligence.

- virtual self, in Virtual Human Interaction Lab

Virtual Self may refer to:

- The Virtual Self, book by journalist Nora Young on social media and digital information 2012
- Alias of Porter Robinson
  - Virtual Self (EP) by Virtual Self, 2017
