= Me TV =

Me TV (and its variations) is a branding used for the following television entities:

- MeTV and MeTV+ (Memorable Entertainment Television) are broadcast television networks owned by Weigel Broadcasting
- MeTV Toons, sister station to MeTV that features classic cartoons
- ME:TV, a former weekday programming block on Nickelodeon, replaced by TEENick
- Me (South African TV channel)
- ME, the former name of the Italian shopping and movie TV channel previously called "for you"
- Middle East Television, a Middle Eastern family channel owned by LeSEA Broadcasting, which uses the METV acronym
- Majuro Educational Television, a former television station in the Marshall Islands
- Music & Entertainment Television, an Austin, Texas cable music channel that also uses the ME TV acronym
- Me TV, a digital television viewer for GNOME
- MeTV, a fictional television network in the Grand Theft Auto universe, parodying MTV
- Mētele, a television station broadcasting on channel 6 (digital) in Nagoya, Japan

== See also ==
- MyTV (disambiguation)
