= Self (surname) =

Self is an English surname. Notable people with the surname include:

- Austin Wayne Self (born 1996), American racing driver
- Bill Self (born 1962), American college basketball coach at the University of Kansas
- David Self (born 1970), American screenwriter
- David Self, a colorist for comics such as WildStorm's Red
- Deanna Self, American politician
- Doris Self (1925–2006), American video game competitor
- Jeffery Self (born 1987), American actor, writer, and comedian
- Jim Self (1943–2025), American tubist and composer
- Keith Self (born 1953), American politician
- Michael Self (born 1990), American racing driver
- Will Self (born 1961), English novelist
- William Edwin Self (1921–2010), American actor and producer
- William Lee Self (born 1958), American musician and composer
- William Self (organist) (1906–1998), American musician

== See also ==
- the surname
