= Mees (crater) =

Crater on the Moon

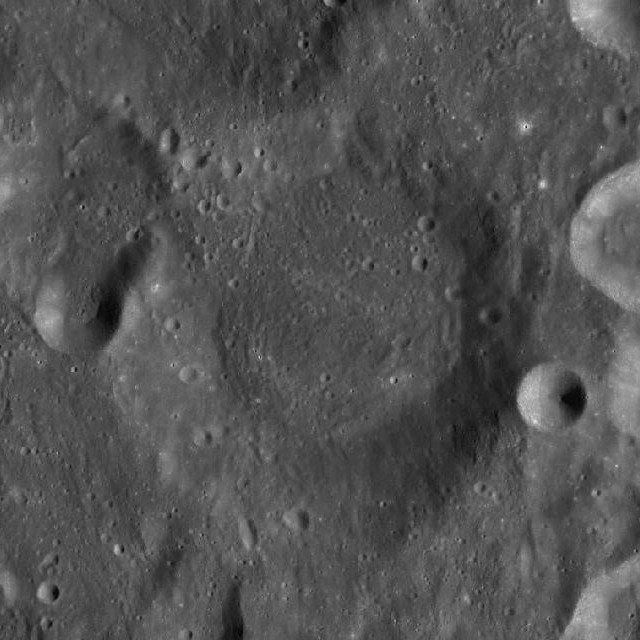
- LRO WAC image
- Coordinates: 13.6°N 96.1°W
- Diameter: 50 km
- Depth: Unknown
- Colongitude: 96° at sunrise
- Eponym: C. E. Kenneth Mees

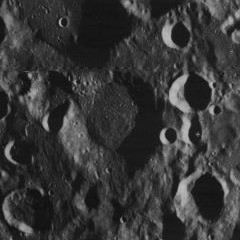
Lunar Orbiter 4 image

Mees is a crater on the far side of the Moon. It is located in a part of the lunar surface that is sometimes brought into view of the Earth under conditions of favorable libration and illumination. Even at such a time, however, this feature is seen from a very low angle and little detail can be perceived.

This crater lies in the northern edge of the huge skirt of ejecta that surrounds the Mare Orientale impact basin. This feature lies several hundred kilometers to the south of Mees, where the outer mountain range Montes Cordillera is located. To the southwest of Mees is the crater Elvey and to the northeast is Einstein, both about three crater diameters distant.

== Satellite craters ==
By convention these features are identified on lunar maps by placing the letter on the side of the crater midpoint that is closest to Mees.

Mees	Latitude	Longitude	Diameter
A	15.7° N	95.2° W	36 km
J	12.3° N	94.7° W	26 km
Y	15.7° N	96.6° W	85 km
