= San Er Yi =

Single by Aoxuan Lee and Kasumi Aizawa
- Released: January 1, 2019
- Recorded: 2018
- Genre: Synth-pop; tropical house; pop-soul
- Length: 3:20
- Label: Streamline; Interscope
- Songwriters: Aoxuan Lee; Momo Fuji (Japanese lyrics)
- Producer: KOUTAPAI

Aoxuan Lee and Kasumi Aizawa singles chronology
"San Er Yi" (2019)	"The Moon Under the Same Sky" (2022)

Music video
- "San Er Yi" on YouTube

"San Er Yi" (Chinese: 三二一; pinyin: sān èr yī; English: "Three Two One") is a song by Chinese singer Aoxuan Lee and Japanese singer Kasumi Aizawa. The songs describe young people who transcend the border, and relationship, above friends less than lovers. The song was released on January 1, 2019.

== Writing and production ==
The song's production started as early as 2018.In order to achieve the desired effect, Aoxuan Lee repeatedly discussed with the arranger several times. Since the lyrics contain two main languages, discussing with the author of the word and working on Chinese translation, both of them have their opinions about the song. The two people in the Chinese and Japanese interlaced scenes played super normally, and completed the recording and shooting of the entire song in advance. The most touching thing is the female singer's patience in English and Japanese pronunciation over and over again, and the friendly support of Aoxuan Lee in Chinese pronunciation.

== Appraise ==
"San Er Yi" is a song composed by Aoxuan Lee and sung with the new generation of female singers in Japan. Invited to Japan EXILE Royal Team to produce. The rhythm of the whole song is cheerful, hierarchical, and gradually progressive, so that the overbearing style is filled with a kind of "Ao-style gentleness" that can capture people's hearts.The unique voice of Aoxuan Lee makes the whole song bright and vivid, as if he is sending you the invitation of love, please step into the whirlpool of his dreams step by step. In the chase of our life and love, it seems that everyone has a set of principles that they are accustomed to. Sometimes they worry too much, sometimes they don't let it go, and what I have to do is to break this set of rules with my uniqueness. To be your domineering but the most gentle opponent, self-confidence is my discouragement, let me occupy your heart and become the superior, just because I have already determined that you will belong to me.

== Personnel ==
Momo Fuji (Japanese) – lyrics assistant

Aoxuan Lee / Mao-sheng Wang (Chinese) – arranger, backing vocal arranger

Aoxuan Lee / Aizawa (Japanese) – backing vocals

Okokouchi Kota (Japanese) – recording engineer

Okokouchi Kota (Japanese) – mixing engineer

Yamamoto Mayo (Japanese) – mixing assistant engineer
