= Myself (disambiguation) =

Myself is a reflexive pronoun in English.

Myself may also refer to:

- The intensive pronoun usage of myself
- Myself (Jolin Tsai album), 2010
- Myself (August Alsina album), 2023

Songs:

- "Myself" (Nav song)
- "Myself" by Yeat from Afterlyfe
- "Myself" by Bazzi from Cosmic
- "Myself" by Leona Lewis from Spirit
- "Myself", a 2019 song by Post Malone from Hollywood's Bleeding
- "Myself" by Taproot from Welcome
- "Myself" by The Verve Pipe from Villains

== See also ==
- Me, Myself, and I (disambiguation)
- Self (disambiguation)
