= Mée =

Mée is the name or part of the name of the following communes in France:

- Mée, Mayenne in the Mayenne department
- Le Mée, Eure-et-Loir in the Eure-et-Loir department
- Le Mée-sur-Seine in the Seine-et-Marne department
- Mées in the Landes department
- Les Mées, Alpes-de-Haute-Provence in the Alpes-de-Haute-Provence department
- Les Mées, Sarthe in the Sarthe department
- Pays de la Mée, a historical region of the Duchy of Brittany

== See also ==
- Mee (disambiguation)
