= Me (Ray Stevens album) =

Studio album by Ray Stevens
- Released: 1983
- Genre: Country
- Label: Mercury
- Producers: Jerry Kennedy, Ray Stevens

Ray Stevens chronology
Greatest Hits (1983)	Me (1983)	He Thinks He's Ray Stevens (1984)

Me is the twentieth studio album by Ray Stevens and his third and final for Mercury Records, released in 1983. In 1982, Stevens returned briefly to Mercury to record this album (his first for that label in 20 years) before moving to MCA Records in 1984. The front of the album cover shows Stevens portraying a painter painting a self-portrait; while the back shows the finished portrait on a table along with a second self-portrait that is sketched by pencil, a cup filled with paint brushes, the paint tray, tubes of paint, a small glass filled with water and a rose, and a lamp. Two singles were lifted from the album: "Love Will Beat Your Brains Out" (which did not chart) and "My Dad".

== Track listing ==
Side 1
No.	Title	Writer(s)	Length
1.	"Love Will Beat Your Brains Out"	Ray Stevens	3:18
2.	"Mary Lou Nights"	Ray Stevens	3:26
3.	"Special Anniversary"	C.W. Kalb, Jr., Carlene Kalb, Ray Stevens	2:37
4.	"Piedmont Park"	C.W. Kalb, Jr., Carlene Kalb	4:00
5.	"Me"	Ray Stevens	3:36

Side 2
No.	Title	Writer(s)	Length
1.	"My Dad"	Dale Gonyea	4:09
2.	"Yolanda"	J. Hooper, K. Sutherland	3:28
3.	"Piece of Paradise Called Tennessee"	Ray Stevens	3:13
4.	"Kings and Queens"	Ray Stevens	4:06
5.	"Game Show Love"	Ray Stevens	2:52

== Personnel ==
- Produced by Jerry Kennedy and Ray Stevens
- Arranged by Ray Stevens
- Engineer – Stuart Keathley
- Recorded and Mixed at Ray Stevens Studio (Nashville, Tennessee).
- Mastered by Randy Kling at Disc Mastering, Inc. (Nashville, Tennessee).
- Photography – Slick Lawson
- Paintings and Sketches – Susan Scott

Musicians

- Ray Stevens – vocals, other synthesizers
- Rodger Morris – acoustic piano, Rhodes piano, Gleemon synthesizer
- Mark Casstevens – acoustic guitars
- John Clausi – electric guitars
- Steve Gibson – electric guitars
- Weldon Myrick – dobro, steel guitar
- Jack Williams – bass
- Jerry Carrigan – drums (1, 3–10)
- James Stroud – drums (2)
- Terry McMillan – percussion, harmonica, Jew's harp
- Nashville String Machine – strings
- Suzi Ragsdale – backing vocals (1), female vocal (7)
- The Cherry Sisters (Sheri Huffman, Lisa Silver and Diane Tidwell) – backing vocals
- Alan Moore – backing vocals
- Hurshel Wiginton – backing vocals

== Chart performance ==
=== Singles ===
Year	Single	Peak positions
Year	Single	US Country
1984	"My Dad"	64
