= Arthur Butler Phillips Mee =

British amateur astronomer (1860–1926)

Arthur Mee
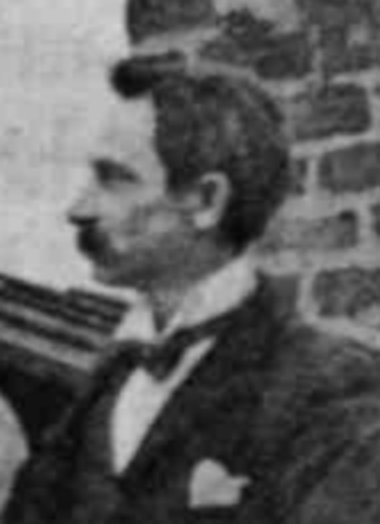
- Born: 21 October 1860; Aberdeen, Scotland
- Died: 15 January 1926 (aged 65); Cardiff, Wales
- Citizenship: British
- Occupation: Journalist
- Known for: Journalism, astronomy and history

There was also an Arthur Mee, who produced The Children's Encyclopedia.

Arthur Butler Phillips Mee (born Aberdeen, 21 October 1860, died Llanishen, 15 January 1926) was a Scottish-born newspaper journalist, editor and notable amateur astronomer.

== Journalist ==
Mee was born the son of a Baptist pastor, George S. Mee, and his wife Elizabeth. After leaving the ministry, Arthur's father became a journalist and he moved the family to western Wales. The son joined his father's profession, becoming a journalist in the town of Llanelli. He was married to Claudia Thomas in 1888.

In 1892 the couple moved to Cardiff, where he began working at the Western Mail, a regional newspaper, continuing there until his death, writing a regular column and performing editorial work as an assistant.

He was the editor of the first edition of Who's Who in Wales, published in 1921.

== Astronomer ==
Mee was noted for his efforts in support of amateur astronomy. In 1890 he was a founding member of the British Astronomical Association and was a Fellow of the Royal Astronomical Society from 1889 to 1901. He was also a member of the Société astronomique de France. His observations focused on the Moon and Mars, including making detailed charts and drawings of the features. Two of his drawings appeared in La Planète Mars by Camille Flammarion.

He was a regular contributor to various scientific and technical publications. In 1892 he became the first to observe the shadow of the moon Titan during a transit of the planet Saturn.

In 1893 Mee published the book Observational Astronomy. Two years later he helped to initiate the foundation of the Astronomical Society of Wales, thereafter becoming its first president and editing its journal. He later acted as editor of the Society's magazine the Cambrian Natural Observer. He continued to contribute to the Society until World War I, when it was disbanded.

The crater Mee on the Moon is named in his honour.

== Historian ==
Mee became noted for his writing about history, particularly about Carmarthenshire. His works included Caermarthenshire Notes, and Miscellany for South-West Wales and a history of the Anglican parish church in Llanelli.
