= Reflexive pronoun =

Anaphoric pronoun

A reflexive pronoun is a pronoun that refers to another noun or pronoun (its antecedent) within the same sentence.

In the English language specifically, a reflexive pronoun will end in -self or -selves, and refer to a previously named noun or pronoun (myself, yourself, ourselves, themselves, etc.). English intensive pronouns, used for emphasis, take the same form.

In generative grammar, a reflexive pronoun is an anaphor that must be bound by its antecedent (see binding). In a general sense, it is a noun phrase that obligatorily gets its meaning from another noun phrase in the sentence. Different languages have different binding domains for reflexive pronouns, according to their structure.

== Origins and usage of reflexive pronouns ==
In Indo-European languages, the reflexive pronoun has its origins in Proto-Indo-European.

In some languages, some distinction exists between normal object and reflexive pronouns, mainly in the third person: whether one says "I like me" or "I like myself", there is no question that the object is the same person as the subject; but, in "They like them(selves)", there can be uncertainty about the identity of the object unless a distinction exists between the reflexive and the nonreflexive. In some languages, this distinction includes genitive forms: see, for instance, the Danish examples below. In languages with a distinct reflexive pronoun form, it is often gender-neutral.

A reflexive pronoun is normally used when the object of a sentence is the same as the subject. Each personal pronoun (such as I, you, he and she) has its own reflexive form:

- I — myself
- thou — thyself/thyselves (archaic)
- he — himself
- she — herself
- it — itself
- we — ourselves
- you — yourself/yourselves
- they — themself/themselves
- one — oneself

These pronouns can also be used intensively, to emphasize the identity of whoever or whatever is being talked about:

- Jim bought himself a book (reflexive)
- Jim himself bought a book (intensive)

Intensive pronouns usually appear near and/or before the subject of the sentence.

Usually, after prepositions of locality it is preferred to use a personal object pronoun rather than a reflexive pronoun:

- Close the door after you. (NOT ... after yourself.)
- He was pulling a small cart behind him. (NOT ... behind himself.)
- She took her dog with her. (NOT ... with herself.)

Compare:

- She's very pleased with herself. (NOT ... with her.)

Certain verbs have reflexive pronouns in some languages but not in English:

- Do you shave on Sundays? (NOT Do you shave yourself on Sundays?)
- Try to concentrate. (NOT Try to concentrate yourself)
- I feel strange. (NOT I feel myself strange.)

Compare to French:

- Te rases-tu le dimanche ? (te is the second person singular reflexive pronoun in French, but it can serve as an object pronoun)
- Essaie de te concentrer.
- Je me sens étrange.

The list of such verbs:

- acclimatize, adapt, behave, complain, concentrate, hide, get up/hot/tired, lie down, meet, move, relax, remember, shave, sit down, undress, wake up, wash...

== Non-reflexive usage in English ==
Non-reflexive use of reflexive pronouns is rather common in English. Most of the time, reflexive pronouns function as emphatic pronouns that highlight or emphasize the individuality or particularity of the noun. Grammatically, the position of reflexive pronouns in this usage is either right after the noun the pronouns are emphasizing or, if the noun is subject, after-verb-or-object position is also possible. For example, "Why don't you yourself do the job?", "Why don't you do the job yourself?", or "I want to fix my phone itself; I will not fix your watch as well."

Some speakers use reflexive pronouns without local linguistic antecedents to refer to discourse participants or people already referenced in a discourse: for example, "Please, forward the information to myself, Anything else for yourself today?" Within the linguistics literature, reflexives with discourse antecedents are often referred to as logophors. Standard English allows use of logophors in some contexts: for example, "John was angry. Embarrassing pictures of himself were on display." However, within Standard English, this logophoric use of reflexives is generally limited to positions where the reflexive does not have a coargument. The newer non-standard usage does not respect this limitation. In some cases, reflexives without local antecedents may be better analyzed as emphatic pronouns without any true reflexive sense.

It is common in some dialects of English to use standard object pronouns to express reflexive relations, especially in the first and sometimes second persons, and especially for a recipient: for example, "I want to get me some supper." While this was seemingly standard in Old English through the Early Modern Period (with "self" constructs primarily used for emphatic purposes), it is held to be dialectal or nonstandard in Modern English.

It is also common in informal speech to use myself in a conjunctive phrase when 'me' would suffice: "She stood by Jane and myself." Also myself is used when 'I' would also be appropriate; for example, Thomas Jefferson was quoted as saying, "Hamilton and myself were daily pitted in the cabinet like two cocks."

== In languages other than English ==
=== Chinese ===
In Mandarin Chinese, the reflexive pronoun is 自(zì)己(jǐ), meaning "self". The antecedent it refers to can be inferred by context, which is generally the subject of the sentence:

- 照(zhào)顾(gù)好(hǎo)自(zì)己(jǐ)。(Take care of (your)self.)
- 我(wǒ)会(huì)照(zhào)顾(gù)好(hǎo)自(zì)己(jǐ)的(de)。(I'll take care of (my)self.)

The antecedent can be reiterated before the reflexive pronoun; this can be used to refer to an antecedent that's not the subject:

- 我(wǒ)给(gěi)了(le)他(tā)他(tā)自(zì)己(jǐ)的(de)书(shū)。(I gave him his own book.)
- 我(wǒ)给(gěi)了(le)他(tā)我(wǒ)自(zì)己(jǐ)的(de)书(shū)。(I gave him my own book.)

Like English, the reflexive can also be used to emphasize the antecedent:

- 他(tā)自(zì)己(jǐ)拿(ná)走(zǒu)了(le)。(He took it (him)self.)

The reflexive can also be the subject of an embedded clause.

- 他(tā)觉(jué)得(dé)自(zì)己(jǐ)很(hěn)聪(cōng)明(míng)。 (He considers (him)self very clever. He feels that he is very clever.)

Also unlike English, the reflexive can refer to antecedents outside of the embedded clause. Because of this, it may be ambiguous whether the antecedent refers to the subject of the main clause or the embedded clause, in which case it may be necessary to reiterate the antecedent:

- 我(wǒ)觉(jué)得(dé)王(wáng)先(xiān)生(shēng)喜(xǐ)欢(huān)你(nǐ)胜(shèng)过(guò)喜(xǐ)欢(huān)自(zì)己(jǐ)。(I feel that Mr. Wang likes you more than he likes (him)self.)
- 我(wǒ)觉(jué)得(dé)王(wáng)先(xiān)生(shēng)喜(xǐ)欢(huān)你(nǐ)胜(shèng)过(guò)喜(xǐ)欢(huān)我(wǒ)自(zì)己(jǐ)。(I feel that Mr. Wang likes you more than he likes myself.)

The reflexive pronoun in Cantonese Chinese, jihgéi, cognate to Mandarin zìjǐ (and thus also written as 自己), also follows the same rules. This was also the case in Classical Chinese, which simply used 己 (Old Chinese: *kəʔ).

=== Danish ===
Danish uses the separate reflexive pronoun sig for third person pronouns, and 'selv' to mark intensive.

- Jeg beskytter mig (selv). (I protect myself)

In Danish, there is also a difference between normal and reflexive genitives, the latter being used only in the singular:

- Anna gav Maria hendes bog. (Anna gave Maria her [Maria's, or possibly some unknown third person's] book.)
- Anna gav Maria sin bog. (Anna gave Maria her [Anna's] book.)

In the latter case, sin is a case of a reflexive possessive pronoun, i.e. it reflects that the subject in the phrase (Anna) owns the object (the book).

=== Esperanto ===
The Esperanto third-person reflexive pronoun is si, or sia for the possessive (to which can be added -j for plural agreement and -n for direct object).

- Li legas liajn librojn. (He reads his (someone else's) books.)
- Li legas siajn librojn. (He reads his (own) books.)

=== French ===
In French, the main reflexive pronoun is 'se', with its indefinite form soi.

There are also intensifying reflexive pronouns, such as moi-même, toi-même, lui-même/elle-même/soi-même, nous-mêmes, vous-mêmes and eux-mêmes/elles-mêmes, similar in meaning (but not often used) to myself, yourself, etc.

French also uses reflexive verbs to express actions that somebody is doing to themselves. Many of these are related to daily routine. For example,

- Je me lave (I get washed, lit "I wash myself")

=== German ===
In German, the reflexive case is not distinguishable from the accusative and dative cases except in the third person reflexive. As discussed above, the reflexive case is most useful when handling third person because it is not always clear that pronouns refer to the same person, whereas in the first and second persons, it is clear: he hit him and he hit himself have different meanings, but I hit me and I hit myself mean the same thing although the former is nonstandard English.

Because the accusative and dative cases are different, the speaker must know whether the verb is reflexive accusative or reflexive dative. There are very few reflexive dative verbs, which must be memorised to ensure that the correct grammar is used. The most notable one is (sich) weh tun (to hurt oneself): Ich tue mir weh. (I hurt myself.) See also German pronouns. The genetive form of the reflexive pronoun sein is effectively lost as it has drifted in meaning to mean specifically 'his'.

=== Hindi/Urdu ===
In Hindi, there are two primary reflexive pronouns, the reflexive pronoun खुद (khud) [from PIE *swé] meaning "self" and pronoun अपना (apnā) [from PII *HáHtmā "self"] which is the possessive reflexive pronoun and both these pronouns are used with all the three, 1st, 2nd, and 3rd, persons. There is also the pronoun आपस (āpas) which is used with either the inessive case-marker में (mẽ) forming the reflexive pronoun आपस में (āpas mẽ) meaning "among ourselves" or the genitive postpostion का (kā) forming the reflexing pronoun आपस का (āpas kā) meaning "of ourselves". The genitive reflexive pronoun can also be used to emphasise when used with the personal genitive pronouns, so e.g. मेरा (merā) "mine" becomes मेरा अपना (merā apnā) "my very own". Alternatively, using the genitive postposition का (kā) with खुद (khud) gives मेरे खुदका (mere khudkā) meaning the same as मेरा अपना (merā apnā). These reflexive pronouns can be used with case-marking postpositions as shown below in the table to the right.

Reflexive pronouns			Singular	Plural	Singular	Plural
Reflexive pronouns			Masculine		Feminine	
Undeclinable	Nominative case		खुद (khud) — "self" आपस (āpas) — "oneselves" अपने आप (apne āp) — "by oneself", "automatically"			
Undeclinable	Oblique case	with noun	खुद (khud) — "self" आपस (āpas) — "oneselves" अपने आप (apne āp) — "by oneself", "automatically"			
Undeclinable	Oblique case	sans noun	खुद (khud) — "self" आपस (āpas) — "oneselves" अपने आप (apne āp) — "by oneself", "automatically"			
Declinable	Nominative case		अपना apnā	अपने apne	अपनी apnī	
Declinable	Oblique case	with noun	अपने apne		अपनी apnī	
Declinable	Oblique case	sans noun	अपने apne	अपन apnõ	अपनी apnī	अप्नियों apniyõ

Case	Postpositional case marker	Reflexive pronoun	Translation
Nominative	—	खुद (khud)	self
Ergative	ने (ne)	खुदने (khudne)	self
Accusative	को (ko)	खुदको (khudko)	self
Dative	को (ko)	खुदको (khudko)	to self
Instrumental	से (se)	खुदसे (khudse)	using, by, with self
Ablative	से (se)	खुदसे (khudse)	from self
Genitive	का (kā)	खुदका (khudkā)	of self
Inessive	में (mẽ)	खुदमें (khudmẽ)	in self
Adessive	पे (pe)	खुदपे (khudpe)	on self
Terminative	तक (tak)	खुदतक (khudtak)	until, till self
Semblative	सा (sā)	खुदसा (khudsā)	like self

=== Hungarian ===
Hungarian has two primary means of expressing reflexivity.

==== Mag- ====
The most common is by means of the stem mag- which behaves much like standard postpositions and case endings in Hungarian in that it can take the six personal suffixes to form the following personal pronouns:

- magam (myself)
- magad (yourself)
- maga (himself/herself)
- magunk (ourselves)
- magatok (yourselves)
- maguk (themselves)

Thus formed, these reflexive pronouns are in the nominative (i.e. subject) case and can take any case ending or postposition: magamnak (for myself), magunk előtt (in front of ourselves), magát (himself/herself (acc.)). However the accusative case marking -t is often omitted in magamat (myself), and magadat (yourself) remaining magam and magad respectively. This is also the case with possessed nouns using the same personal endings e.g. házam (my house), and kocsid (your car) both of which can be interpreted in less formal language as either nominative or accusative depending on context. Nonetheless, using the accusative ending -t (as in házamat and kocsidat) is still considered formal and correct.

Relfexive pronouns in the nominative case exist but have no logical reflexive function. Rather they have an intensifying purpose and follow the subject (if given):

- ő maga csinálta (He himself did it)
- a kutya maga ásta a gödröt (the dog himself dug the hole)
- magam is így gondoltam (I myself am also of this mind)

note the absence of non-reflexive subject pronoun in the latter case where the verb marking implies the subject. In order to intensify a relfexive pronoun in any other case, i.e. a reflexive pronoun with a genuine reflexive grammatical function the word saját (one's own) is added before the reflexive pronoun:

- saját magának okoz gondot (he's making trouble for his own self).

==== Ön ====
The second reflexive mechanism in Hungarian is the word ön (self) which is most commonly used as a prefix with the meaning of (one)self-, For example öngyilkos (suicide victim, lit. "self-murderer") and önfeláldozni (to sacrifice oneself). This can be combined with the reflexive pronouns above to express intensity or formality:

- önmagam (myself)
- önmagad (yourself)
- önmaga (himself/herself)
- önmagunk (ourselves)
- önmagatok (yourselves)
- önmaguk (themselves)

The prefix ön can also be used in the manner of saját, above, but the sense is more formal than intensive.

==== Formal pronouns ====
Hungarian does not have a T-V distinction as in many European languages, rather it uses third person reflexive pronouns and third person verbs to indicate politeness. The singular pronouns ön (self) and maga (himself/herself) and the plural pronouns önök (selves) and maguk (themselves) are used when addressing one or more people (respectively) in a formal context, whether written or spoken. Largely seen as interchangeable, ön and önök are less common and perceived as somewhat more formal than maga and maguk. The combined forms önmaga and önmaguk are only used to express intensity and genuine reflexivity as laid out above, but are not used as non-reflexive formal/polite pronouns.

Grammatically, when using ön, maga, önök, or maguk as subject pronouns, they will be treated as though they were non-reflexive third person pronouns. This means verbs agree with a third person subject (despite having a second person referent in reality) but unlike a true reflexive object pronoun (which requires a definite verb ending), verbs using formal/polite pronouns conjugate for definite or indefinite objects as that verb's actual object requires. Compare the following:

- (ti) mostok (you (pl.) are washing [informal])

Here the verb uses the second person plural indefinite ending -tok indicating that the object of the verb is unclear or non-existent.

- (ti) magatokat mossátok (you (pl.) are washing yourselves [informal])

Here the verb has changed from the second person plural indefinite ending to the definite ending -játok to indicate the reflexive object.

- (ők) mosnak (they are washing [informal])

Here the verb uses the third person plural indefinite ending -nak

- maguk mosnak or önök mosnak (you (pl.) are washing [formal])

Here the verb also uses the third person plural indefinite ending -nak as the formal pronoun is third person, but unlike true reflexives, it does not require a definite verb ending.

- magukat mossák ("they are washing themselves" or "you (pl.) are washing yourselves" [formal])

Here the verb is conjugated with the third person plural definite ending -ják as the pronoun is a genuine reflexive. In this case, it is not possible to tell from the sentence alone whether the intention is third person informal, or second person formal. In reality however when clarity is required an explicit subject pronoun can be used to express informal third person (ők magukat mossák), or more formal language can be used to express formal second person usage (magukat tetszik mosni lit. "it pleases to wash oneselves").

=== Icelandic ===
There is only one reflexive pronoun in Icelandic and that is the word sig. It does not differ between genders nor number.

The reflexive pronouns are as such:

- Reflexive pronoun: sig (himself/itself/herself/themselves)
- reflexive possessive pronoun: sinn (his/her/its/their)

	Singular and plural		
	Masculine	Feminine	Neuter
Nominative	(hann/hún/það/þeir/þær/þau) ("he/she/it/they")		
Accusative	sig		
Dative	sér		
Genitive	sín		

==== Examples ====
The reflexive pronoun refers to the third person:

- Hann talar um sig. (masc. sing.) (He talks about himself)

=== Italian ===
The reflexive pronouns in Italian are:

- mi (first person singular)
- ti (second person singular)
- si (third person singular)
- ci (first person plural)
- vi (second person plural)
- si (third person plural)

Reflexive pronouns are usually employed when the direct object in a sentence is also its subject, thus reflecting the action as expressed in the verb on the subject itself.

This pronoun allows the building of three kinds of reflexive verbal forms: proper, non-proper (or ostensible), and reciprocal.

- Io mi lavo, or io lavo me (I wash myself): reflexive proper, because the subject is at the same time the object of the sentence.

Notice that the sentence I wash myself could also be translated in Italian as io lavo me stesso, stressing the reflexiveness much more than English.

The complete list of intensifying reflexive pronouns is:

- me stesso (first person masculine singular)
- me stessa (first person feminine singular)
- te stesso (second person masculine singular)
- te stessa (second person feminine singular)
- se stesso (third person masculine singular)
- se stessa (third person feminine singular)
- noi stessi (first person masculine plural)
- noi stesse (first person feminine plural)
- voi stessi (second person masculine plural)
- voi stesse (second person feminine plural)
- se stessi (third person masculine plural)
- se stesse (third person feminine plural)

=== Japanese ===
In the Japanese language, jibun (自分) and jibunjishin (自分自身) are reflexive pronouns that correspond roughly to 'oneself'. They differ from English in some ways; for example, jibun and jibunjishin do not have to agree in gender or number where English reflexives do. Jibun can further be bound locally or long distance where English reflexives must always occur locally. Although both English and Japanese pronouns must be c-commanded by their antecedents, because of the syntactic structure of Japanese, long distance binding is allowed.

=== Korean ===
In Korean, jagi 자기(自己) and jasin 자신(自身) are used as reflexive pronouns that refer to 'myself', 'himself', 'herself', and 'ourselves'. Jagijasin 자기자신(自己自身) is also a reflexive pronoun but it usually corresponds only to the first person (myself).

=== Latin ===
In the first and second persons, Latin uses the ordinary oblique forms of the personal pronouns as reflexive pronouns. In the third person, Latin uses the special reflexive pronoun se, which is the same for all genders and numbers, and declined in all cases except the nominative and the vocative.

	Singular or Plural		
	Masculine	Feminine	Neuter
Nominative	—		
Vocative	—		
Accusative	sē, sēsē		
Genitive	suī		
Dative	sibi		
Ablative	sē, sēsē		
Locative	sē, sēsē		

==== Example ====
- per se

=== Macedonian ===
Accusative		Dative	
Full	Short	Full	Short
себе	се	себе	си

An alternative full form, себеси, is used for emphasis.

- Ана ѝ ја даде нејзината книга на Марија. (Ana gave her [Maria's] book to Maria.)
- Ана ѝ ја даде својата книга на Марија. (Ana gave her [Ana's] book to Maria.)

=== Novial ===
(Novial is a constructed language, mostly based on Romance languages.)

- Lo vida lo. (He sees him.)

=== Polish ===
==== Oblique ====
Nominative	–
Genitive	siebie
Dative	sobie
Accusative	się, siebie
Instrumental	sobą
Locative	sobie

In Polish the oblique reflexive pronouns is się and it declines as above. It is used with 1st, 2nd and 3rd person:

- Myję się "I wash myself"
- Myjesz się "You wash yourself"
- Piotr się myje "Peter washes himself"

It has been grammaticalized to a high degree, becoming also a marker of medial and/or anti-causative voice:

- Drzwi się otworzyły "Door opened", lit. "Door opened itself"
- Przewróciliśmy się "We fell", lit. "We turned ourselves over"

Similarly, the dative sobie gained an additional, volitional/liberative meaning, usually used in informal speech:

- Idę sobie ulicą, patrzę sobie, a tam leży sobie dziesięć złotych. "So, I'm casually walking down the street and suddenly I see 10 złoty just lying there.", lit. "I'm walking for myself, I'm looking for myself, and there lies for itself 10 złoty."
- Jestem sobie przedszkolaczek... "I'm a kindergartner" (from children's song)

Moreover, the phrase iść sobie has been lexicalized and means "to leave" (cf. French s'en aller):

- Nudna ta impreza, idę sobie. "This party's boring, I'm leaving"

==== Possessive ====
Polish also has a possessive reflexive pronoun swój (swoja, swoje). It assumes the gender of the possessed object, not that of the possessor.

- Zabrał swoje rzeczy i wyszedł. "He took his (own) things and went out."
- Spojrzał na swój telefon. "He looked at his (own) phone."
- Anna oddała Kasi swoją książkę. "Anna gave her (Anna's) book to Cathy."

Not using a reflexive pronoun might indicate the other party's possession of the object:

- Anna oddała Kasi jej książkę "Anna gave Cathy her (Cathy's) book back."

==== Intensive ====
The intensive meaning is done by the pronoun sam (inflecting for case, gender and number):

Nominative	sam m	samo n	sama f	sami v pl	same nv pl
Genitive	samego		samej	samych	
Dative	samemu		samej	samym	
Accusative	samego, sam	samo	samą	samych	same
Instrumental	samym		samą	samymi	
Locative	samym		samej	samych	

Usually inflected się is added in obliques:

- Słucham siebie samej (fem.) "I listen to myself"
- Wierzę sobie samej (fem.) "I believe myself"

Emphatically the accusative can be replaced with dative:

- Zrobiłem to sam (masc.) "I did it myself", "I did it alone"
- Zrobiłem to samemu (masc.) "I did it myself", "I did it personally"

=== Portuguese ===
- Quando ele o vê. (When he sees him.)
- Quando ele se vê. (When he sees himself.)

There are two ways to make a reflexive sentence in Portuguese. The first way is by attaching the reflexive pronoun (me, te, se, nos - also vos) to the verb. The second way is by also attaching the words mesmo/a(s) or próprio/a(s), masc/fem. (plural) (="self"), immediately after the verb to add stress/intensity :

- Eu me magoei. / Magoei-me. (I hurt myself.)

=== Romanian ===
- sieşi, sie, îşi, şi- Dative: himself, herself
- pe sine, se, s- Accusative: himself, herself

=== Russian ===
In Russian, the pronoun себя sebya universally means "oneself"/"myself"/"himself", etc. It is inflected depending on the case.

When used to indicate that the person is the direct object of the verb, one uses the accusative form, sebya. (It does not have a nominative form.)

- Он поранил себя. On poranil sebya. ("He has wounded himself.")

Emphasized forms are "sam sebya" - masculine, "sama sebya" - feminine, "sami sebya" - plural. Unless there is a particular reason (emphasis, answering a question) the word "sam" usually comes after the noun it is emphasizing.

- Он сам поранил себя. On sam poranil sebya. ("He has wounded himself." Literally: "He himself has wounded himself.")

However the form, e.g., сам себя oн поранил, is grammatical as well.

This sentence underlines that the subject inflicted the wounds while in the previous example, "sebya" merely indicates that the subject was wounded.

The reflexive pronoun sebya gave rise the reflexive affix -sya (-ся) used to generate reflexive verbs, but in this context the affix indicates that the action happened accidentally:

- Он поранился (He has wounded himself.)

There are stylistic differences between the three usages, despite being rendered in the same way in English.

Russian has a reflexive possessive as well.

- Он любит свою жену. On lyubit svoyu zhenu. (He loves his wife (his own). - Reflexive possessive)
- Он любит его жену. On lyubit yego zhenu (He loves his wife (someone else's). - It is ambiguous in English, but less so in Russian.)

Because of the existence of reflexive forms, the use of a non-reflexive pronoun indicates a subject that is different from the object. If it is impossible, the sentence is invalid or at least irregular:

- Он поранил его. On poranil ego. ("He has wounded him (someone else).")

=== Serbo-Croatian ===
Serbo-Croatian uses the reflexive pronoun sebe/se, which is the same for all persons, numbers and genders, and declined as follows:

Nominative	–
Genitive	sebe
Dative	sebi/si
Accusative	sebe/se
Vocative	–
Instrumental	sobom
Locative	sebi

- Ana je dala Mariji njenu knjigu. ("Ana gave her [Maria's] book to Maria.")
- Ana je dala Mariji svoju knjigu. ("Ana gave her [Ana's] book to Maria.")

The words that modify the reflexive pronoun do show gender and number:

- Čudio se samom sebi. "He wondered at himself."

The enclitic form of the reflexive pronoun, se, has been grammaticalized to a high degree:

- Vrata su se otvorila. lit. "Door opened itself" ("Door opened")
- Prevrnuli smo se. lit. "We turned ourselves over" ("We fell")

=== Spanish ===
In Spanish, the reflexive pronouns are: me/nos (first person singular/plural), te/os (second person) or se (third person). In Latin America, os is not used, being replaced by se for the pronoun ustedes. For clarity, there are optional intensifying adjuncts for reflexive pronouns, accompanied by mismo/a (masculine and feminine forms for "self"). They are not strictly adjuncts: sí mismo/a (instead of se), ti mismo/a (in the Río de la Plata region, it is replaced by vos mismo/a), mí mismo/a—they usually postpend the genitive.

Example with "wash oneself":

- yo me lavo (I wash myself.)

Note that the indirect object "le"/"les" does not override "se" in the reflexive.

=== Slovene ===
The Slovene language has reflexive pronouns as well:

- Ana je dala Mariji njeno knjigo. (Ana gave her [Maria's] book to Maria.)
- Ana je dala Mariji svojo knjigo. (Ana gave her [Ana's] book to Maria.)

=== Uzbek ===
In Uzbek, the pronoun o'zi (IPA: [ɜzɪ]), refers to oneself and, to create a person specific forms, it requires certain affixes:

myself - o'zi + -mni => o'zimni (IPA: [ɜzɪmnɪ]); to myself - o'zi + -mga => o'zimga (IPA: [ɜzɪmgʌ]); from myself - o'zi + -mdan => o'zimdan (IPA: [ɜzɪmdʌn]);

yourself - o'zi + -ngni => o'zingni (IPA: [ɜzɪngnɪ]); to yourself - o'zi + -ngga => o'zingga (IPA: [ɜzɪngʌ]); from yourself - o'zi + -ngdan => o'zingdan (IPA: [ɜzɪngdʌn]);

himself/ herself/ itself - o'zi + -ni => o'zini (IPA: [ɜzɪnɪ]); to himself/ herself/ itself- o'zi + -ga => o'ziga (IPA: [ɜzɪgʌ]); from himself/ herself/ itself- o'zi + -dan => o'zidan (IPA: [ɜzɪdʌn]);

ourselves - o'zi + -mizni => o'zimizni (IPA: [ɜzɪmɪznɪ]); to ourselves- o'zi + -mizga => o'zimizga (IPA: [ɜzɪmɪzgʌ]); from ourselves - o'zi + -mizdan => o'zimizdan (IPA: [ɜzɪmɪzdʌn]);

yourselves - o'zi + -ngizni => o'zingizni (IPA: [ɜzɪngɪznɪ]); to yourselves - o'zi + -ngizga => o'zingizga (IPA: [ɜzɪngɪzgʌ]); from yourselves - o'zi + -ngizdan => o'zingizdan (IPA: [ɜzɪngɪzdʌn]);

themselves - o'z + -larini => o'zlarini (IPA: [ɜzlʌrɪnɪ]); to themselves- o'z + -lariga => o'zlariga (IPA: [ɜzɪlʌrɪgʌ]); from themselves- o'z + -laridan => o'zilaridan (IPA: [ɜzɪlʌrɪdʌn]);

Emphatic-pronoun use:

myself - o'zi + -m => o'zim (IPA: [ɜzɪm])

yourself - o'zi + -ng => o'zing (IPA: [ɜzɪng])

himself/ herself/ itself - o'zi + - => o'zi (IPA: [ɜzɪ])

ourselves - o'zi + -miz => o'zimiz (IPA: [ɜzɪmɪz])

yourselves - o'zi + -ngiz => o'zingiz (IPA: [ɜzɪngɪz])

themselves - o'z + -lari => o'zlari (IPA: [ɜzlʌrɪ])

Basically, the suffixes change based on the preposition used:

- Jon o'ziga mashina sotiboldi. (John bought himself a car)
- Biz futbol o'ynayotib o'zimizni jarohatladik. (We hurt ourselves playing football)
- Bu holodilnik o'zini o'zi eritadi. (This refrigerator defrosts itself )
- Men o'zimdan ranjidim. (I'm annoyed with myself)
- Ular o'zlariga qaradilar. (They looked at themselves)
- O'zlaringizni ehtiyot qilinglar. (Take care of yourselves)

=== Vietnamese ===
In Vietnamese, the reflexive pronoun is mình whose meaning can be myself, herself, himself, themselves etc. depending on the number/gender of its antecedent.

- Thằng John tự đánh mình (John hit himself.)

=== Guugu Yimithirr ===
A Pama–Nyungan language, Guugu Yimithirr uses the suffix /-gu/ on pronouns—much like -self in English, to emphasize that the action of the verb is performed by the subject and not someone else. Take for example, the following exchange.

A:

Ngadhu gudaa gunda-la!
1SG.GEN.ABS dog.ABS hit-IMP
Hit my dog!

B:

Nyundu-ugu gunda-la!
2SG.NOM-REF hit-IMP
Hit it yourself!

== See also ==
=== Grammar ===
- Reflexive verb
- Reciprocal pronoun
- Reciprocal construction
- Logophoricity

=== Works ===
- Myself (disambiguation)
- Yourself (song), the twelfth single by Dream
- Herself (film), a 2020 drama film directed by Phyllida Lloyd
- Herself the Elf, a franchise line for young girls similar to Strawberry Shortcake
- Himself (disambiguation)
