= Carmen Selves =

Spanish painter

Carmen Selves (born Maria Carmen Selvas Baltierrez on January 4, 1931 in Manresa) is a contemporary Catalan painter.

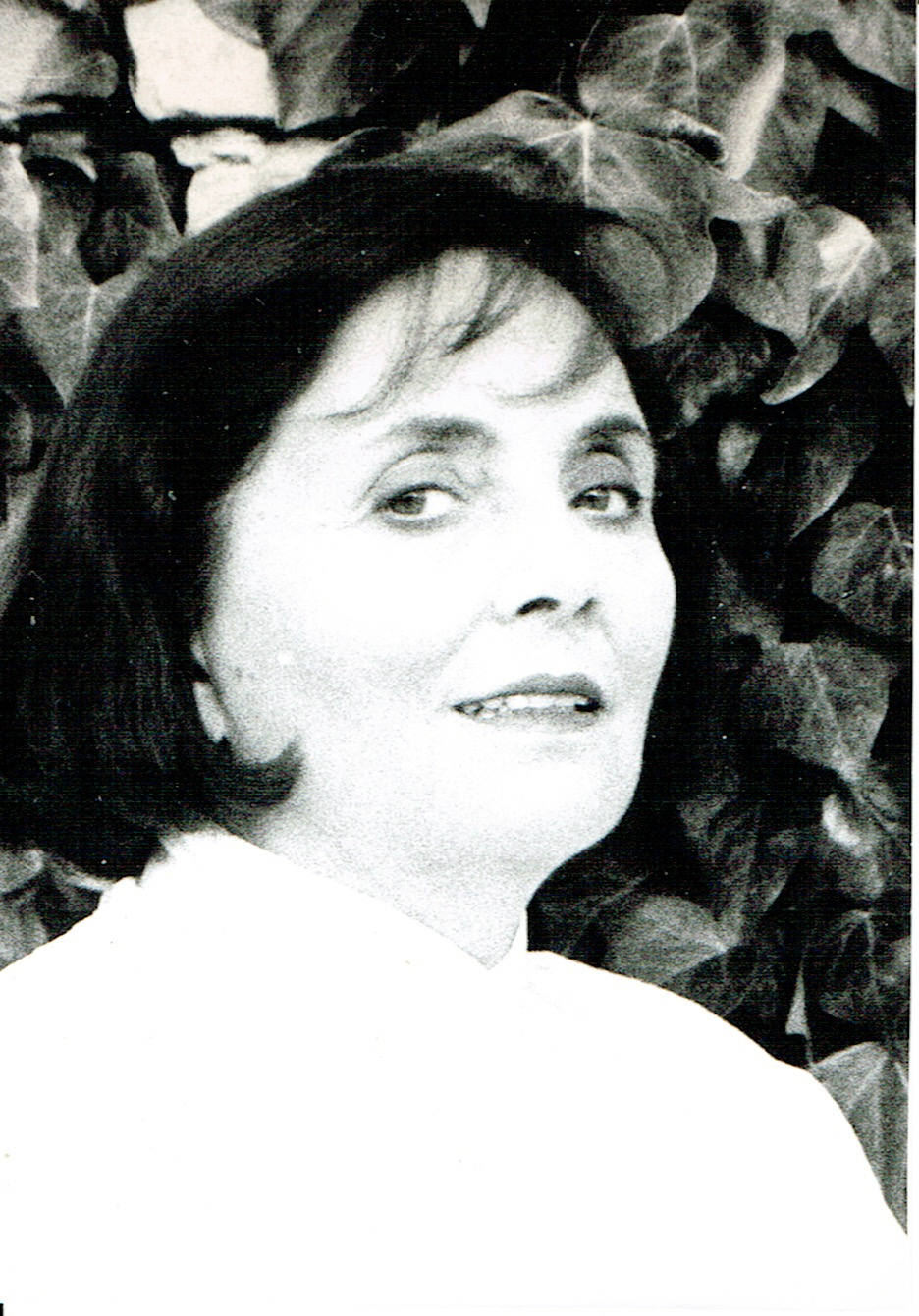
Helsinki (1995).

== Biography ==
Carmen Selves was born in Manresa. The daughter of Joan Selvas i Carner and Carmen Baltierrez i Clotet, she lived during the post-war period at the start of her career, being completely outside any political orientation but suffering from the consequences of the situation.

Specialized in portrait and oil painting, and a pianist, she enter the Reial Acadèmia Catalana de Belles Arts de Sant Jordi in Barcelona 1952, where she obtains her diploma in 1955. Her first oil paintings were completed when she was 9 years old, and were influenced by her mother who possessed artistic gifts. When she was only 14 years old, she painted a rural landscape of Castelltallat range; she received a special mention in a painting competition of the parish of Sant Josep de Manresa and was recognized as a talented painter by the critic Ferran Hurtado Sanchis. This pushed her to study painting not only in Manresa, being an active painter of the Artistic Circle of Manresa, but also in Barcelona.

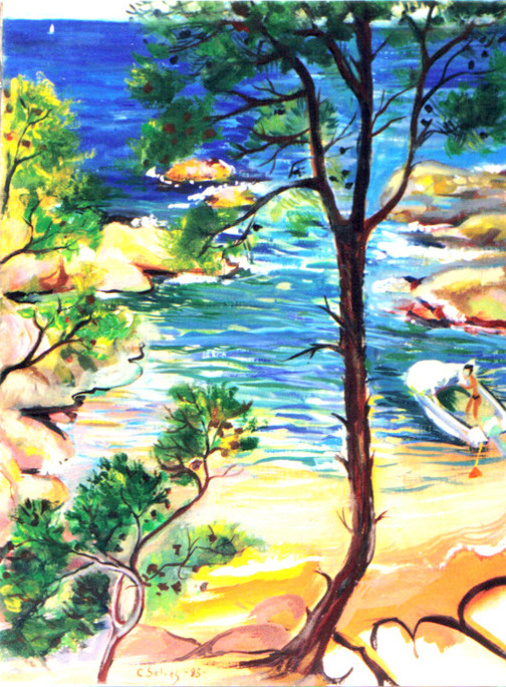
Costa Brava, Platja d'Aro (1985).

At the School of Sant Jordi, she had as teachers renowned painters such as Francisco Ribera Gómez, Josep Puigdengolas Barella or Ernest Santasusagna i Santacreu. But the greatest influence, as well as the classics which she knew well, was her tutor after the completion of her studies, Evarist Basiana i Arbiell, and his unique theory of the color that is applied in some of Carmen Selves paintings. In 1952 he made a donation to the Manresa County Museum. In 1979, she obtained a diploma in archeology at the University of Barcelona. She also worked at Museu Nacional d'Art de Catalunya. Later, in 1992, following her personal interest and to meet the academic requirements of the baccalaureate, she wrote a university thesis on the painter Lluïsa Vidal.

=== Dissemination of the works ===
Despite the fact that most part of her works are not for sale because they are very personal with family themes, Carmen Selves have been taking care of spreading her works through a number of books, magazines, and exhibitions in which she has appeared. With the advent of the internet, her works have been disseminated through her personal website, and she has worked to increase her popularity with internet art sellers and/or promoters such as Circle arts, Artquest, Arteinformado, Artelista, DeviantArt, Agora Gallery, Cuadros de una exposición and others. The result of this continuous marketing effort has grown her popularity. Carmen Selves is a painter who could be classified chronologically as belonging to the Spanish school of the mid-20th century, but well into the 21st century, she is still an active and innovative painter.

=== Private life ===
Married to Josep Maria Vicente Esforzado, she had four children. Her many obligations made her presence rare in the world of exhibitions between 1957 and 1994.

== Evolution of works style ==
First a portrait painter in the first stage of her career, she has a style halfway between expressionism figurative and impressionism. Recently her portraits and vision are more symbolists and she uses other techniques besides oil painting: murals, ceramics, acrylics and others. She participates graphically and in other forms (scripts, voice, directing, production, etc.) in the creation of computerized animations in an unusual style and even created a video game in which the themes provide a positive message. She also creates landscapes (marine, rural, floral, and animal), urban themes, and still life. She illustrates interactive children's books of which she herself publishes limited editions.

== Exhibitions ==
The works of Carmen Selves have been shown, so far, in 18 solo exhibitions and 26 group exhibitions. Carmen Selves has exhibited in Finland, Spain, France, Italy, Japan, and the United States among others.

- 2014 : New York Agora Gallery
- 2015 : Museum Gustavo de Maeztu of Estella
- 2011 : Galeria ESART
- 2017 : Galeria ESART
- 2021 : Artexpo New York 2021
