= Dom Mee =

British adventurer

Dom Mee is a British adventurer who attempted in August/September 2005 to cross the North Atlantic Ocean in a 14' (4.26 m) kite-propelled boat, dubbed the Little Murka.

His journey began from St. John's, Canada, on 19 August 2005. The main kite was 107.6 sq. ft. (10 m^{2}.) in area, which gave the boat speeds of up to thirteen knots. The boat was carrying 60 days' worth of provisions. The total length of the journey was to be 2,000 nautical miles (3,700 km). He planned to arrive at Exmouth in Devon southwest England in 35 days, but arduous weather conditions slowed his progress often driving him back, and damaging his communications equipment. After weathering three severe storms, the Kite Boat lost its sea anchor on Sunday 25 September, lashed by 70 km/h winds in seas up to 18 m high. A series of capsizes followed and Dom's cabin filled with water. He spent five hours clinging to the upturned hull before a wave righted the boat. For a further 24 hours, he managed to keep the boat afloat before he was rescued by the Canadian Coast Guard. A year later the Little Murka encrusted with barnacles washed up on the shores of Ireland and Dom's "farewell" video was recovered.
