= Henry Mee =

British painter (born 1955)

Henry Mee (born 1955) is a British painter.

== Early life and education ==
Mee read Fine Art at the University of Leeds awarded a place by Professor Sir Lawrence Gowing, graduating in 1979.

== Exhibitions ==
On 23 May 1990 Arts Minister Richard Luce MP opened Mee's one man show British Eminencies: Portraits of our Age at Sotheby's London and unveiled his portrait of Queen Elizabeth II.

The novelist Anthony Powell wrote the accompanying catalogue descriptions of the 31 paintings. His sitters were: the Queen; Lord Carrington; the Princess Royal; Lord Wilson of Rievaulx; Lord Home of the Hirsel; Lord Hailsham of Saint Marylebone; Lord Armstrong of Ilminster; Baroness Park of Monmouth (Principal of Somerville College, Oxford); Professor Dorothy Hodgkin (Chancellor University of Bristol); Lord Penney of East Hendred; Lord Zuckerman of Burnham Thorpe; Admiral Lord Fieldhouse of Gosport; Admiral Sir John Woodward; Sir John Harvey Jones (Chairman of ICI); Sir Peter Walters (Chairman of BP); Lord Forte of Ripley; Sir Yehudi Menuhin; Anthony Powell; Sir Hugh Casson; Sir Roger de Grey (President of the Royal Academy); Sir Richard Attenborough; Sir John Mills; Sir Peter Hall (Director of the National Theatre); Sir Robin Day; Sir Peter Imbert (Commissioner, Metropolitan Police); General Sir Frank Kitson; Robert Runcie (Archbishop of Canterbury); Neil MacGregor (Director of the National Gallery); Lord Denning of Whitchurch; and Lord King of Wartnaby.

The Parliamentary Works of Art Committee commissioned Mee to paint Prime Minister Margaret Thatcher, former Prime Ministers Lord (Harold) Wilson, and Lord (Alec) Douglas-Home, Lord (Denis) Healey and the Queen.

On 28 September 1995, the British Red Cross unveiled Henry Mee's portrait of Princess Diana at Christie's London. he Princess sat for Mee at Kensington Palace.

In September 2001, the Fine Art Society London held a retrospective exhibition, Henry Mee: Portraits of Eminent Britons.

Lord Bragg wrote the catalogue notes for New British Eminencies. His sitters were: Prime Minister Boris Johnson; Governor of the Bank of England Lord (Mervyn) King; Chancellor of the Exchequer George Osborne; First Secretary of State Foreign and Commonwealth Affairs Lord (William) Hague of Richmond; Lord Chancellor and Secretary of State for Justice Lord (Kenneth) Clarke of Nottingham; Lord (Alistair) Darling of Roulanish (Chancellor of the Exchequer); Alastair Campbell (Downing Street Director of Communications and Strategy); General Sir Mike Jackson (Chief of the General Staff); David Miliband (Secretary of State for Foreign and Commonwealth Affairs); Lord (Chris) Patten (Governor of Hong Kong 1992-97, Chancellor Oxford University, Chairman BBC Trust); Sir Vince Cable (Secretary of State for Business, President of the Board of Trade); The Baroness (Eliza) Manningham-Buller (Director General of MI5); author Baroness (PD) James of Holland Park; Sir George Martin (Beatles Producer, Parlophone); The Lord (Melvyn) Bragg of Wigton (Chancellor University of Leeds, Editor of the South Bank Show); Gerald Scarfe; and Lord in Appeal in Ordinary Lord (Leonard) Hoffmann of Chedworth.

Henry Mee is married with two sons and lives in Hampstead.
