= C. E. K. Mees Observatory =

Astronomical observatory in New York, US

- Alternative names: C.E.K. Mees Observatory
- Named after: Kenneth Mees
- Organization: University of Rochester
- Location: South Bristol, New York
- Coordinates: 42°42′01.0″N 77°24′31.56″W
- Altitude: 720 m (2,360 ft)
- Website: website

Telescopes
- 24 inch telescope: 61 cm Boller and Chivens Cassegrain reflector

C. E. K. Mees Observatory is an astronomical observatory in Bristol, New York, owned and operated by the University of Rochester. The observatory is named after C. E. Kenneth Mees, "in honor of his pioneering work in the development of sensitive photographic emulsions for use in astronomy."

The site possesses a 24 in (61 cm) Cassegrain telescope on an English-style telescope mount in a two-story dome in addition to a 12 in (31 cm) Orion SkyQuest Dobsonian, an inoperative 6 in (15 cm) Newtonian reflector on a German equatorial mount, and a 6 in refractor used as a guide telescope. The observatory is notable as a premier location for astronomical observation in Ontario county due to the low levels of light pollution and relative elevation, given that it is situated on the highest point in Ontario county. The observatory also boasts a vacation home run by the University of Rochester which is used for public outreach, University faculty retreats, and astronomers who stay the night. The public is welcome to come on free public tours of the observatory during the summer. The tour website may be found in the external links section below.

== See also ==
- List of astronomical observatories
