= Mäe =

Family name

Origin
- Language: Estonian
- Meaning: "hill"
- Region of origin: Estonia

Other names
- Variant form: Mägi

Mäe is an Estonian surname meaning "hill"; it is the genitive singular form of the word mägi.

As of 1 January 2024, 317 men and 316 women in Estonia have the surname Mäe. Mäe ranks 136th for men and 159th for women in terms of surname distribution in the country. The surname Mäe is most commonly found in Lääne-Viru County, where 11.31 per 10,000 inhabitants of the county bear the name.

Notabale people with the surname Mäe include:

- Aivar Mäe (born 1960), conductor and musician
- Epp Mäe (born 1992), freestyle wrestler
- Hjalmar Mäe (1901–1978), politician
- Mikk Mäe (born 1996), pop singer
