= Les Mées, Sarthe =

Les Mées
- Commune
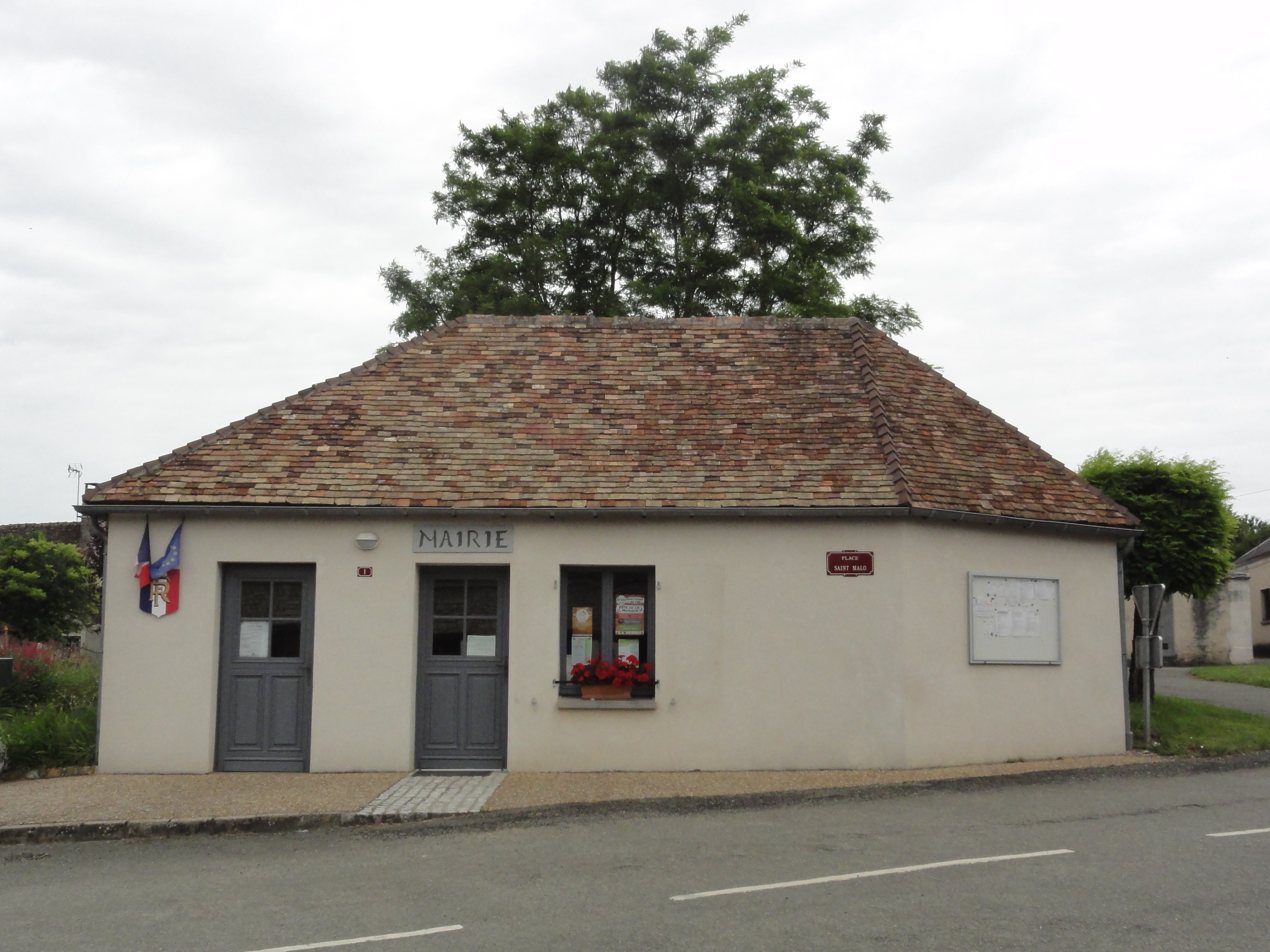
- Les Mées Town hall
- Location of Les Mées
- Location within France Location within Pays de la Loire
- Coordinates: 48°18′51″N 0°13′54″E
- Country: France
- Region: Pays de la Loire
- Department: Sarthe
- Arrondissement: Mamers
- Canton: Mamers

Government
  - Mayor (2020–2026): Yveline Assier
- Area^{1}: 6.80 km^{2} (2.63 sq mi)
- Highest elevation: 136 m (446 ft)
- Lowest elevation: 91 m (299 ft)
- Population (2023): 103
  - Density: 15.1/km^{2} (39.2/sq mi)
- Time zone: UTC+01:00 (CET)
  - Summer (DST): UTC+02:00 (CEST)
- INSEE/Postal code: 72192 /72260
- ^{1} French Land Register data, which excludes lakes, ponds, glaciers > 1 km^{2} (0.386 sq mi or 247 acres) and river estuaries.

Les Mées (French pronunciation: [le me]) is a commune in the Sarthe department in the region of Pays de la Loire in north-western France.

== See also ==
- Communes of the Sarthe department
