= Christian Madden =

British musician (born 1976)

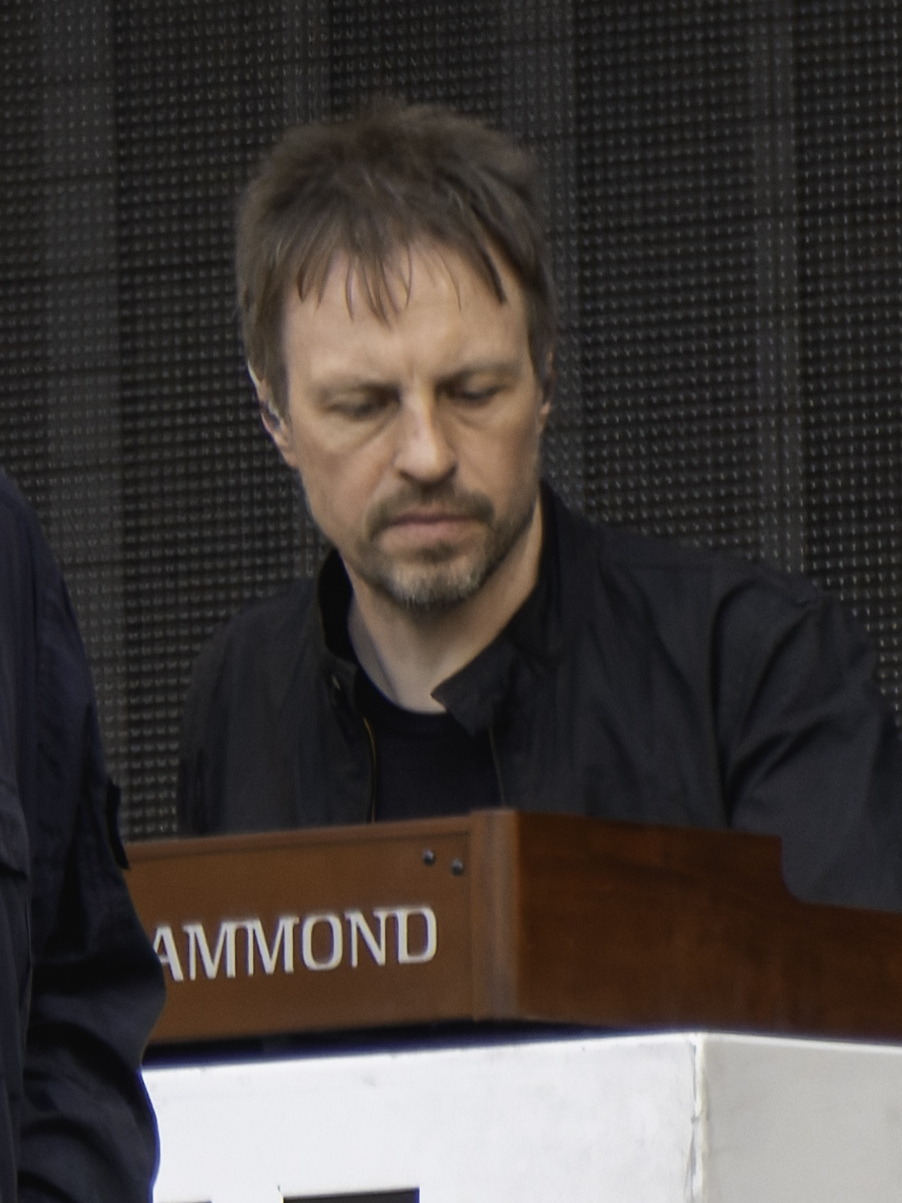
- Madden performing with Liam Gallagher in 2018

Background information
- Born: Christian Madden; September 1976 (age 49)
- Genres: Progressive rock; psychedelic rock; alternative rock; britpop
- Instrument: Keyboards
- Years active: 1991–present
- Formerly of: The Earlies, Tokolosh, The Uptown Band, Ofay, Atomic Rooster
- Website: www.christianmadden.co.uk

Christian Madden (born 1976) is a British musician and producer. He is best known for his roles as a keyboardist and founding member of The Earlies and a touring member of Oasis.

== Biography ==
His father, Joe Madden from Burnley, joined the soul band, Uptown Band in the 1960's. They played with and supported acts such as Dusty Springfield, Stevie Wonder, Ben E King, Gladys Knight & Curtis Mayfield. Madden joined the band at a young age and played alongside other local musicians including Danny Handley.

In June 1996 along with Handley, he played with Cosmos at Burnley Mechanics, replacing Milltown Brothers keyboard player Barney Williams.

During 1996 he toured with former Wings and Moody Blues guitarist Denny Laine, in support of Laine's album, Reborn.

Madden and Giles Hatton from Lancashire and Brandon Carr and John Mark Lapham from the United States formed the neo-psychedelic soft rock band The Earlies in 2004. NME described them as "psychedelic electro-mind meld".

They played the main stage at The Greenman festival at Baskerville Hall, near Hay on Wye on Sunday 22 August 2004.

Their debut album, These Were The Earlies, described as a "thrilling listening experience" was released on Names records in 2005.

Prior to appearing at Glastonbury in 2007 they played their full set as a warm up gig at the Bridge Bier Huis in Burnley, Lancashire.

In 2008 he wrote and produced a number of tracks with former Blue singer, Simon Webbe, at a recording studio in Colne, Lancashire, owned by Bruce Thomas, which he ran along with his brother Nicky Madden.

In 2011 he formed TOKOLOSH with his brother Nicky, singer and guitarist Liam Frost, bass player Nathan Sudders from The Whip and drummer Richard Young.

He appeared at the Cloudspotting festival in July 2012 with 10 piece covers band Ofay featuring Liam Frost on vocals.

In 2011 he played with Van Downham along with Fairport Convention guitarist, Jerry Donahue.

In 2015, he joined a reformed Atomic Rooster as organist, although he departed the band in 2017 to join Liam Gallagher's touring band.

In May 2025 it was announced that he would be joining Oasis for the 2025 tour.

== Influences ==
His major influences are The Beatles, The Zombies and Booker T.

== Selected discography ==
=== with The Earlies ===
- These Were the Earlies (2005)
- The Enemy Chorus (2007)

=== with King Creosote ===
- KC Rules OK (2005)

=== Plan B ===
- Who Needs Actions When You Got Words (2006)

=== Sarah Lowes ===
- Tomorrows Laughter (2008)

=== Paul Heaton ===
- Acid Country (2010)

=== Blind Atlas ===
- Kodiak Bear (2012)

=== TOKOLOSH ===
- Stay Strong (2014)

=== with Liam Gallagher ===
- As You Were (2017)
- Why Me? Why Not. (2019)
- C'mon You Know (2022)
- Down by the River Thames (2022)
- Knebworth 22 (2023)

=== Christian Madden and The Enemy Chorus ===
- The Wrecking Place (2017)
- Understand the Rules (2020)
- The Extra Weight (2023)
- Shinbone's Revenge (2025)
