= The Best of Ray Stevens =

The Best of Ray Stevens is the name of:

- The Best of Ray Stevens (1967 album)
- The Best of Ray Stevens (1968 album)
- The Best of Ray Stevens (1997 album)
