= It's Been So Long (disambiguation) =

It's Been So Long may refer to:

== Song ==
- "It's Been So Long", B-side to "Sing, Sing, Sing (With a Swing), a 1936 song written Louis Prima
- "It's Been So Long", track on 1963 album This Is Ray Stevens
- "It's Been So Long", 1965 single by The Ikettes
- "It's Been So Long", track on 1967 album Pandemonium Shadow Show Harry Nilsson
- "It's Been So Long", track on 1972 album Nervous on the Road by Brinsley Schwarz
- "It's Been So Long", single and track on 1974 album Rock Your Baby by George McCrae
- "It's Been So Long", track on 1976 album Savage Eye by The Pretty Things
- "It's Been So Long", track on 1976 I'm Easy (album) by Keith Carradine
- "It's Been So Long", track on 1981 album Twangin... by Dave Edmunds
- "It's Been So Long", track on 1986 October File (album) by Die Kreuzen
- "It's Been So Long", track on 1986 album A Lot of Love by Melba Moore
- "It's Been So Long", 2005 single by Greg Johnson (musician)
- "It's Been So Long", track on 2005 Bring It On! (HorrorPops album)
- "It's Been So Long", track on 2006 album Micah P. Hinson and the Opera Circuit by Micah P. Hinson
- "It's Been So Long", track on 2008 I'll Be Around (album) by Split Lip Rayfield
- "It's Been So Long", track on 2008 EP Bang Band Sixxx by VAST
- "It's Been So Long" (featuring 8Ball), track on 2008 album This Might Be the Day by MJG
- "It's Been So Long", track on 2010 album Future Sons & Daughters by AM
- "It's Been So Long" (오랜만이죠) (feat. Shin Ji-soo), 2013 single by Ra.D
- "It's Been So Long", track on 2013 Join the Dots (Toy album)
- "It's Been So Long", track on several albums by Harry James
- "It's Been So Long", a song based on the second video game in the FNAF franchise composed by The Living Tombstone
- "The Song is You"/"It's Been So Long", single by Trudy Richards with Pete Rugolo

== Albums ==
- It's Been So Long, 1954 album by Helen Ward (singer)
- It's Been So Long, 1971 album by Spencer Davis
- It's Been So Long, 1987 album by Downchild Blues Band reissued in 1997

== See also ==
- It's Been So Long Darling, a 1945 song by Ernest Tubb
