= Tokolosh (band) =

English rock band

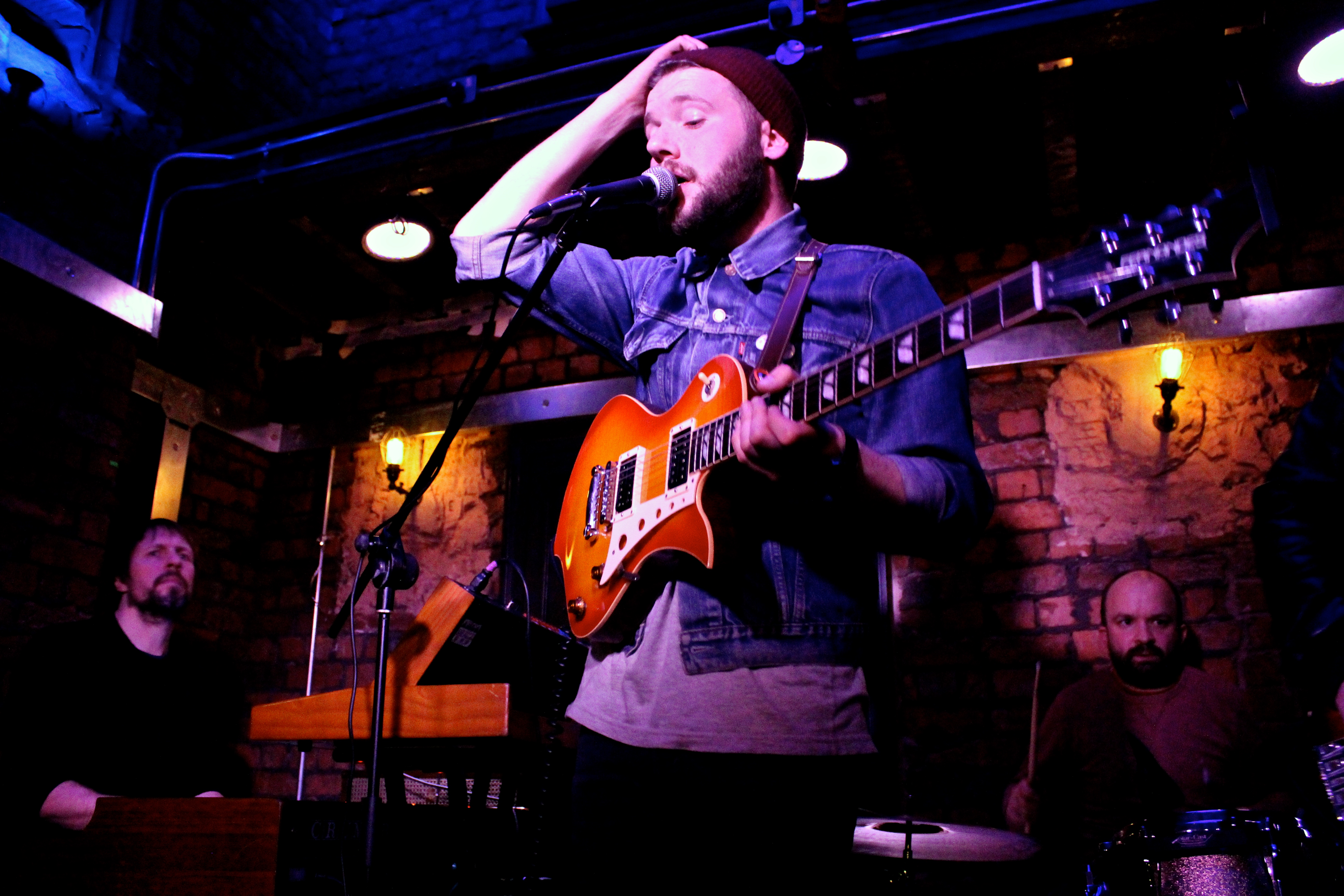
- Christian Madden, Liam Frost and Richard Young performing with Tokolosh at The Eagle Inn in Salford. Photograph © Emma Farrer

Background information
- Origin: Manchester, England
- Genres: Folk
- Years active: 2011–present
- Labels: Static Caravan; Jack to Phono
- Members: Liam Frost; Christian Madden; Nicky Madden; Nathan Sudders; Richard Young
- Website: wearetokolosh.com

Tokolosh (written in all caps) are a Manchester-based English folk rock band formed in 2011 and is composed of singer and guitarist Liam Frost, keyboard players Christian and Nicky Madden from the Earlies, bassist Nathan Sudders from The Whip and drummer Richard Young.

== Biography ==
The band was dreamt up when all the members were taking part in one of Marc Riley’s annual Christmas shows on BBC 6 Music, which involved a large number of local musicians coming into the studio to sing carols live during the show. Frost had already worked with several members of the band on other projects, including during the recording of his second solo album when he travelled to the Earlies studio in Burnley to record a song In a 2012 newspaper interview with the band, Christian Madden was quoted as saying "We read a review of Liam's second album and it criticised him for being a ballsy vocalist…And I just thought, I've got to work with that guy."

Named after the Tokoloshe; a mischievous sprite which appears in African mythology, the band's moniker was suggested by Christian Madden as an emergency measure but as the band developed their songs many had working titles which include the word Tok and the name began to define the music. TOKOLOSH's music was described in national press as "danceable folk with darkly sexual lyrics." and the band explained this by saying "All of these songs focus on a slightly different side of adult relationships…The desperate and slightly obsessive aspect maybe, but also how people can change inside of a relationship - for better or worse.".

On 12 January 2012 TOKOLOSH performed a live session on BBC 6 Music for DJ Marc Riley’s radio show where he described the band as a supergroup. The band played three tracks; The Hollow, Tok De France and Shapeshifter; the second song of which underwent a minor name change by the time it appeared on the album Stay Strong.

The band played a second 6 Music session for Riley on 22 October of the same year where again they played tracks which at the time only had working titles. TokoDiddly later became The Knife Twists whilst Tokvember was released as Unknown Animal. The band also played TokoHorse which retained this title when released as a single by Static Caravan.

October 2012 also saw the release of the band's debut single consisting of the tracks The Hollow and TokoHorse. The 7" vinyl release was limited to 300 grey wax pressings and was released via the Static Caravan label with artwork from Marc Atkins. Static Caravan released a further 7" from the band in January 2013 containing the tracks Shapeshifter and Bloodlines.

In August 2014 the band released their debut album Stay Strong on the Jack To Phono label with Louder Than War describing it as "a landmark album sweetly accessible and full of surprises".

== Live performances ==
TOKOLOSH have played sporadic dates in eclectic venues mainly in Manchester. Their debut Manchester show was in the reading room of the historic John Rylands Library on Deansgate and other shows have included a gig in Whitworth Park to mark the temporary closure of the Whitworth Art Gallery as it shut for refurbishment, a support slot for I Am Kloot at the Manchester Apollo on 13 December 2013, an outdoor show in St Anne’s Square, Manchester as part of the Dig The City urban gardening festival and a woodland gig at Festival No 6 in Portmerion where they played the 'In The Woods' stage. In March 2015 it was announced that the band would play micro-festival Cloudspotting; a festival situated at Gisburn Forest in the Forest of Bowland which TOKOLOSH previous played in 2013.

Some of the band's gigs have seen slight line up changes when the musicians have had commitments with their other bands. Sudders bass duties have been covered by guitarist Tom Lloyd Goodwin whilst drummer Bo Walsh has stood in for Richard Young when he was available.

== Discography ==
Albums

- Stay Strong (1 August 2014) Jack To Phono

Singles and EPs

- The Hollow / Tokohorse (1 October 2012) Static Caravan (vinyl release)
- Shapeshifter / Bloodlines (7 January 2013) Static Caravan (vinyl release)
- The Root (1 July 2013) Jack To Phono
- Unknown Animal (4 November 2013) Jack to Phono
- A Great Wave (30 May 2014) Jack to Phono
