= Micah P. Hinson and the Gospel of Progress =

Studio album by Micah P. Hinson
- Released: 2004
- Genre: Indie rock, Folk, Americana, Country
- Length: 51:23
- Label: Sketchbook Records (UK), Talitres (FR)
- Producer: Micah P. Hinson, Christian Madden, Tom Knott, G. T. Hatton, J. M. Lapham

Micah P. Hinson chronology
Micah P. Hinson and the Gospel of Progress (2004)	The Baby & the Satellite (2006)

Professional ratings
Review scores
Source	Rating
Pitchfork	(7.6/10) link

Micah P. Hinson and the Gospel of Progress is an album by Micah P. Hinson, released in 2004. It includes the single Beneath the Rose, which peaked at 111 on the Music Week charts in the UK. The album itself was number 5 on Rough Trade Shop's 100 Best Albums of 2004.

== Track listing ==
1. Close Your Eyes
2. Beneath The Rose
3. Don't You (Part 1 & 2)
4. The Possibilities
5. As You Can See
6. At Last, Our Promises
7. I Still Remember
8. The Nothing
9. Stand In My Way
10. Patience
11. You Lost Sight On Me
12. Caught In Between
13. The Day Texas Sank To The Bottom Of The Sea

== Personnel ==
- Micah P. Hinson - vocals, guitars, piano, snare drum, floor tom, arrangement, production, photography
- Christian Madden - piano, Hammond M102 organ, accordion, melodica, KORG M510, Hohner pianet, wah wah Fender Rhodes, Mellotron strings, Mellotron flute, arrangement, production
- Nicky Madden - alto saxophone, tenor saxophone, baritone saxophone, flute, recorder, backing vocals
- Gareth Maybury - tuba, euphonium, trombone, trumpet
- Sara Lowes - vocals, backing vocals
- Richard Young - drums, percussion
- Tom Knott - trumpet, backing vocals, recording, mixing, production
- Semay Wu - cello
- H. da Massa - harmonica
- Alex Berry - upright bass
- Sue Garnett - backing vocals
- G. T. Hatton - production
- J. M. Lapham - production
- Noel Summerville - mastering
- Madamoiselle Antoinette - modeling
