= Milltown Brothers =

English indie rock group

milltown brothers
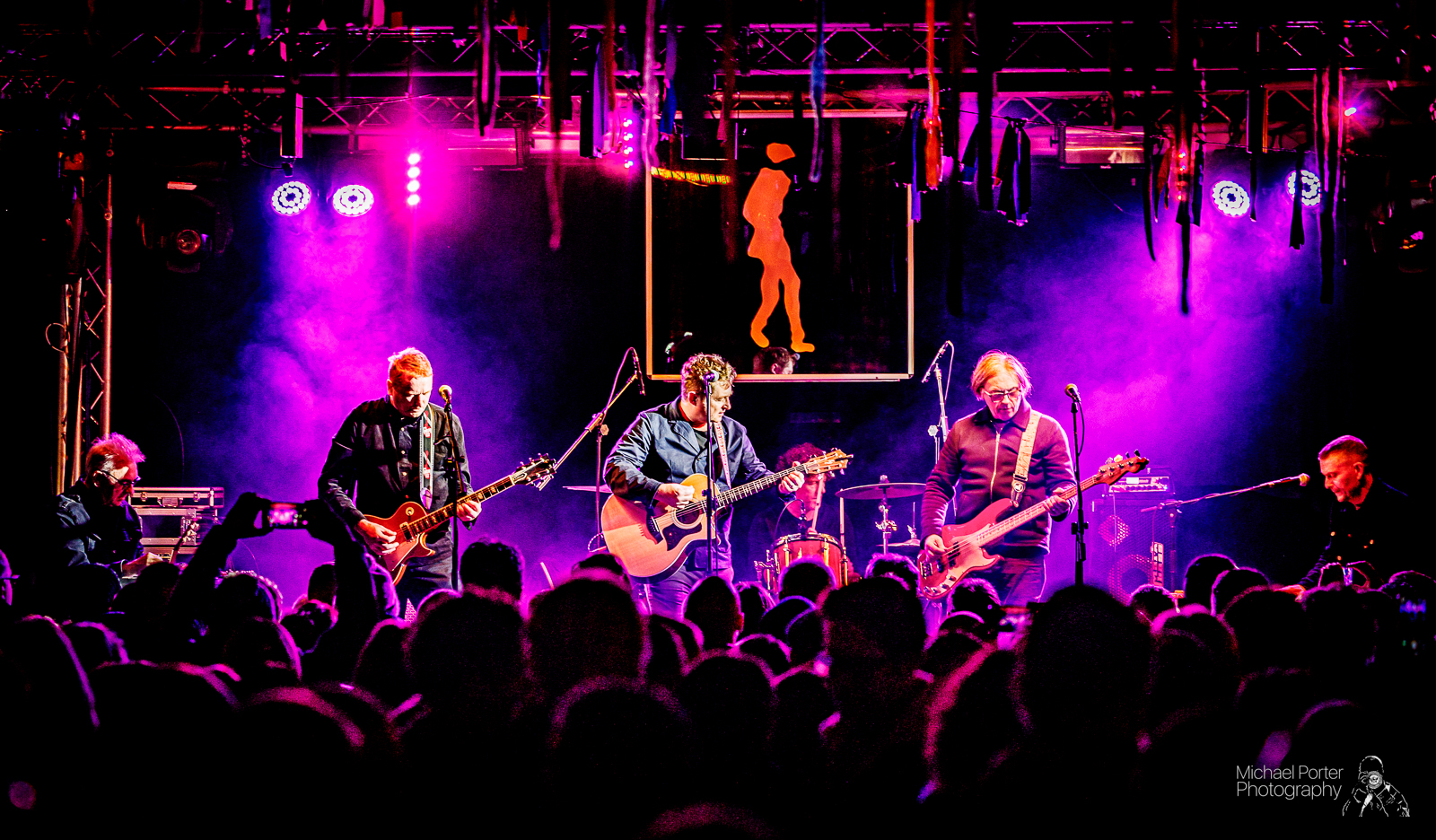
- milltown brothers performing in 2023

Background information
- Origin: Colne, Lancashire, England
- Genres: Indie rock, jangle pop
- Works: www.officialcharts.com
- Years active: 1989–1993; 2004–present
- Label: A&M
- Spinoffs: Another Crush, Kingsize Screamer, The Rubbish, The Showponies, Greenheart & Sixtyfivemiles
- Members: Matt Nelson; Simon Nelson; James Fraser; Barney Williams; Nian Brindle
- Website: www.milltownbrothers.co.uk

Milltown Brothers, (stylised as milltown brothers) are an English indie band from Colne, Lancashire, England.

They are best known for the top 40 single "Which Way Should I Jump" and "Here I Stand", which was used as the theme tune to the BBC drama All Quiet on the Preston Front.

== History and career ==
=== Early releases ===
In 1989 the band's first independent release on Big Round Records, was the "Coming From The Mill" EP featuring live favourite "Roses" and the songs "Something On My Mind" and "We’ve Got Time." The NME magazine tipped Milltown Brothers for stardom in the 1990s.

The band's second indie single was "Which Way Should I Jump" backed up by "Silvertown" on the B-side.

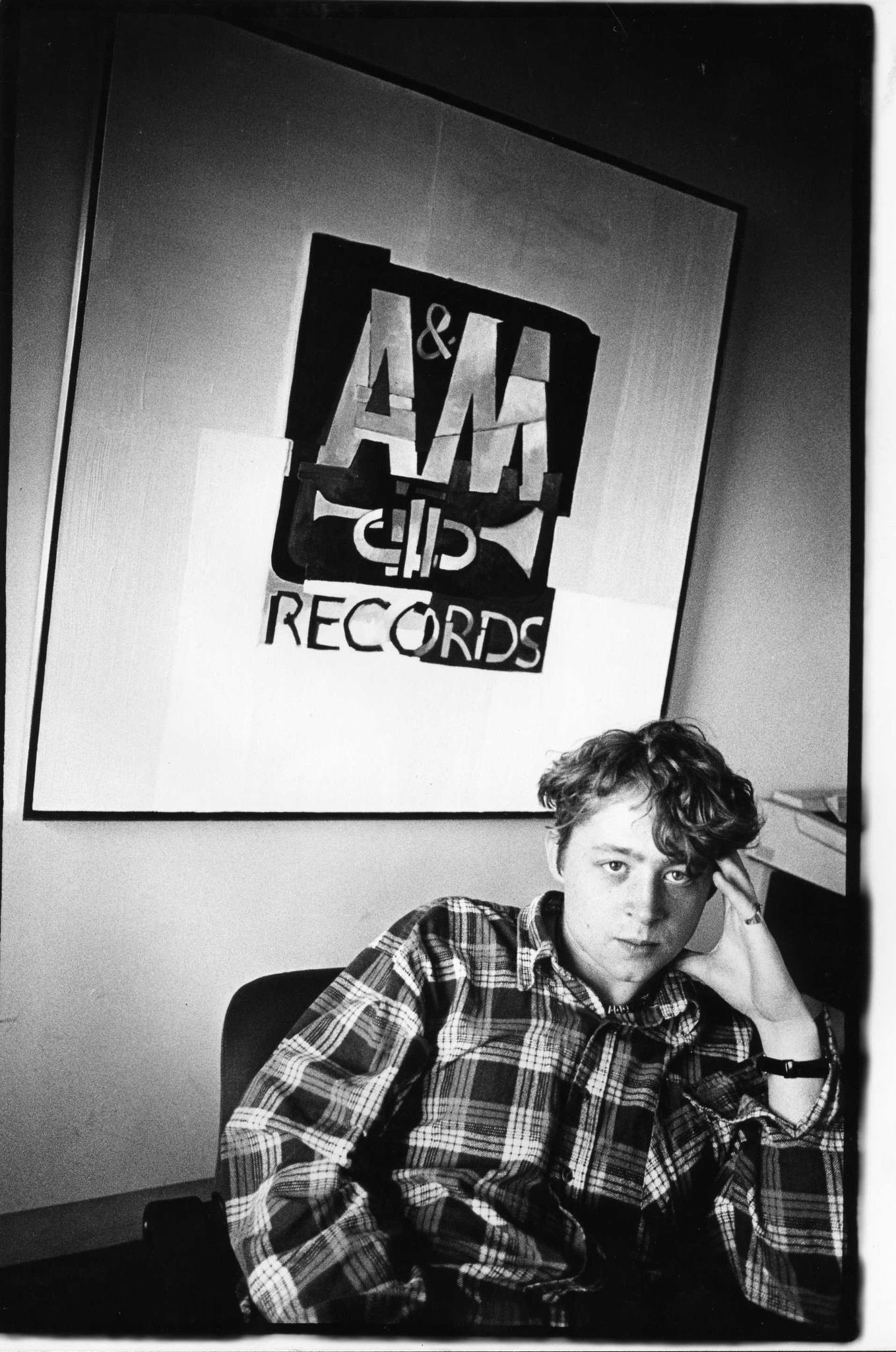
Matt Nelson in 2025

=== A&M years (1990–1993) ===
After the band signed to A&M Records worldwide in 1990, "Which Way Should I Jump?" was re-recorded and entered the UK Singles Chart at number 38. It also reached number 10 in the U.S. Billboard Modern Rock chart.

Recorded in Bath in the summer of 1991, the album Slinky followed. It peaked at number 27 in the UK Albums Chart. Q Magazine described it as the "Byrds with hard-edged contemporary pop and upfront vocals" and awarding it a maximum five stars. It was produced by Dave Meegan who had previously worked on the U2 albums, The Joshua Tree and Rattle & Hum.

It was placed at #46 by the NME in their 1991 best album of the year list.

The next single released from the album was "Here I Stand", which was also used as the theme tune for the BBC television programme, Preston Front. It peaked at number 41 in the UK Singles Chart.

In 1993, the single "Turn Off" was released ahead of the band's second album Valve. The album was not as successful as Slinky and the band eventually left the A&M label.

A 12-track compilation, The Best Of Milltown Brothers, was issued by Spectrum Music in 1997.

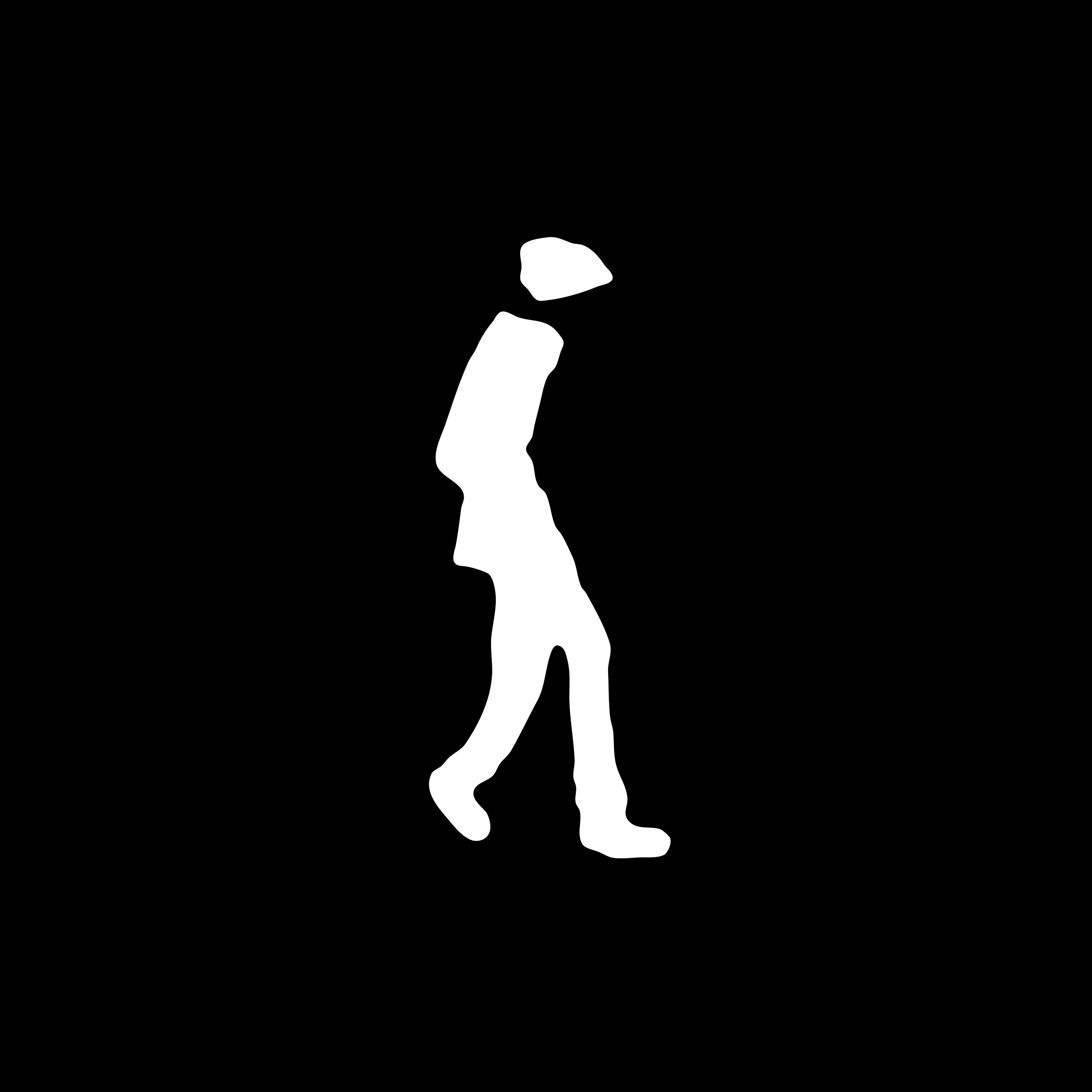
Stanley Logo

=== Independent releases ===
It was 10 years before the band worked together again. In March 2004 they released their third studio album, Rubberband. A double CD, it was released on their own label Rubber Band Records and made available on the band's website.

In 2009 an extended 17-track retrospective ‘’Milltown Brothers - Best Of’’ was released on Cherry Red Records.

In the summer of 2015, Milltown Brothers released their fourth album Long Road, which was once again self-released.

In 2020 a further album Stockholm featuring eight new songs was released.

In 2022 a compilation of independent singles and demos from 1987 to 1990 was released titled Tongue-Tied Mesmerised.

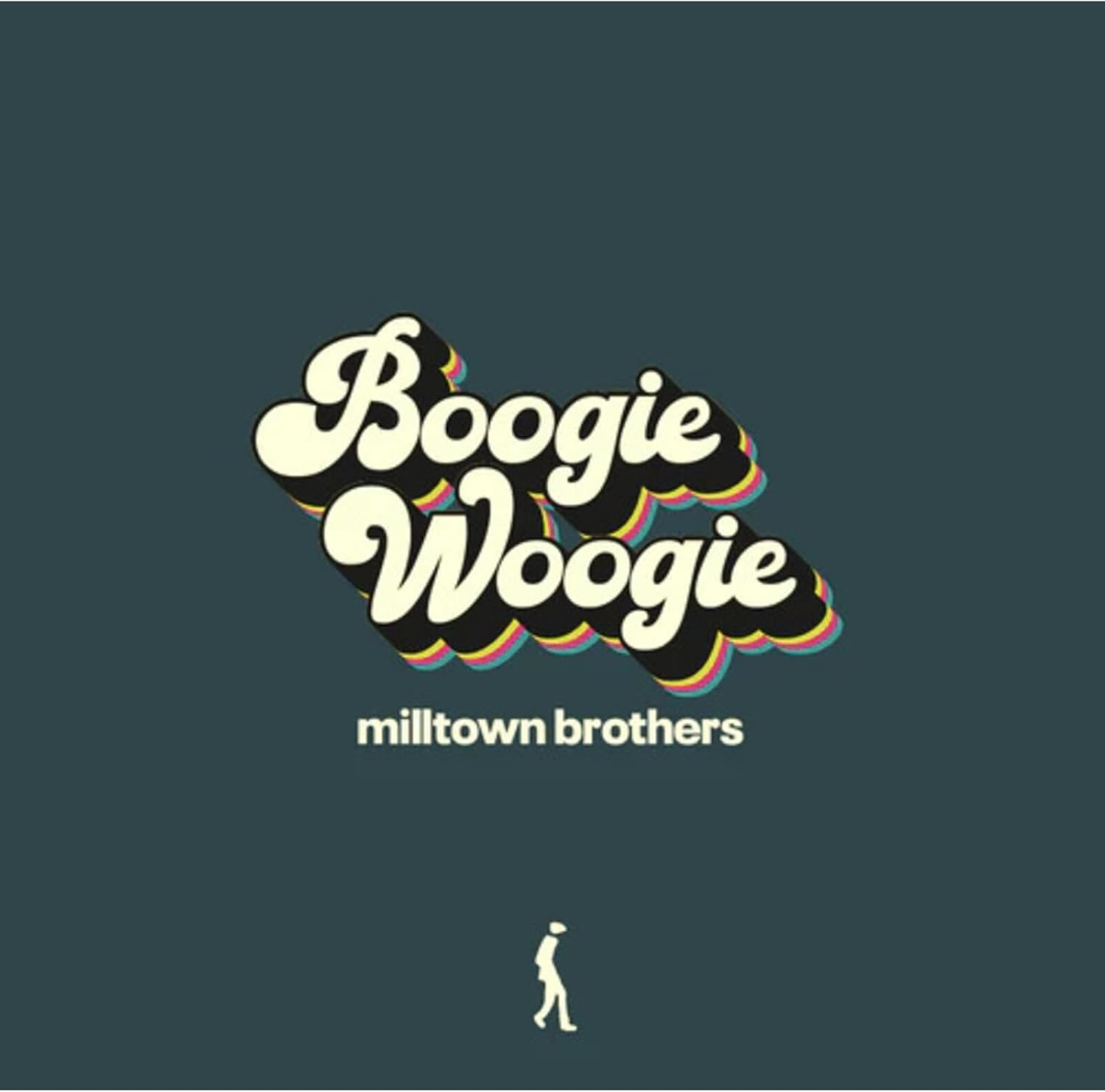
Boogie Woogie album cover (2025)

=== 2024–present ===
The band began recording their sixth studio album, Boogie Woogie, in the summer of 2024 at Groove Studios in Burnley.

The record was released by Last Night from Glasgow in September 2025 on LP, CD, digital download and streaming.

On 19th September 2025 the album entered the Official UK Album Charts at #71.

It also charted on the Physical Album Chart #66, Vinyl Album Chart #37, Independent Albums Chart #25, Scottish Albums Chart #9 & Album Breakers Chart #4.

This marked the first time an album of theirs had entered the top #100 since the 1993 release of Valve.

== Live appearances ==
The band made their Reading Festival debut in 1990, playing the Mean Fiddler stage. and again in 1991. The following year on Friday 28 August 1992, they supported The Wonder Stuff & The Charlatans on the main stage.

In 1991 the band embarked on a tour of North America with The Wonder Stuff and flew to New York on 15 September. The tour started in Baltimore and included venues such as Marquee in New York, Rock Candy in Seattle, Cabaret Metro in Chicago & First Avenue Club in Minneapolis.

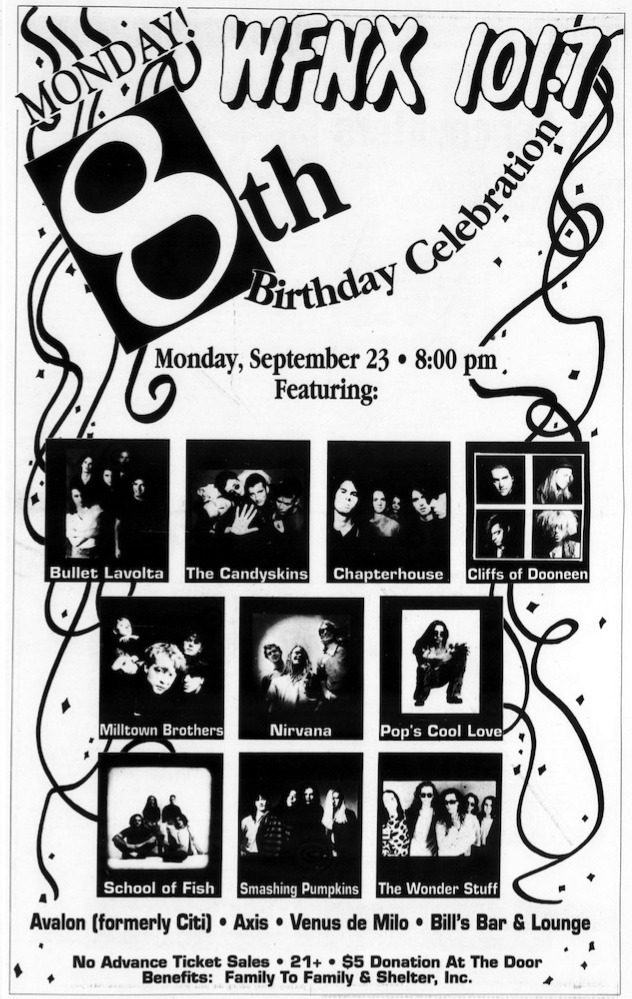
WFNX ad, 1991

On Monday 23 September 1991 the band appeared at the WFNX 101.7 8th birthday celebration festival in Boston, Massachusetts alongside The Wonder Stuff, The Smashing Pumpkins & Nirvana.

Originally booked for 6 October but moved to 14 October 1993 they were the headline act at Manchester Academy 3. Supported by the Real People and an up-and-coming Manchester band called Oasis.

On 13 April 2012 the band made an appearance at the Colne Muni to promote the charity album Songs From the Neighbourhood, which was released to raise money for Pendleside Hospice and Derian House Children's Hospital in Chorley. The album included the milltown brothers' first single, Roses. It also included songs by The Rubbish, Danny Handley, Simon Webbe, The Hollies and the former Burnley Building Society song The Best Dreams Begin with B by George Chandler.

On 26 August 2023 they played Hebden Bridge Trades Club to a capacity crowd. The gig followed renewed interest in the band after Slinky made an appearance earlier in the year on an episode of Tim's Twitter Listening Party hosted by The Charlatans frontman, Tim Burgess.

The band featured at the Tim Burgess Merch Market at Gorilla, Manchester in May 2025 and at Kendal Calling playing Tim Peaks Diner in August 2026.

== Other ventures ==
The Rubbish, a short lived comedy showband heavily influenced by The Wurzils later known as The Tidy, featured Barney Williams on keyboards. They released an album titled “Crazy Farmers" in 1998 and played a small number of support shows for Status Quo, one of which was at Wembley Arena, where James Fraser joined them on bass. He played with them again at their sold out homecoming headline gig at Nelson Cricket Club in 2003 to over 50 people, while also supporting them with his band the Showponies.

Fraser and Williams also appeared with The Rubbish at Kendal Calling in 2018.

Fraser has also played bass in Jay Diggins' band and is frontman of Greenheart, a band from Lancaster.

As of 2023, Barney Williams is also a member of The Animals & Friends.

Simon Nelson was part of a four piece called SixtyFiveMiles around 2009, along with Ash Woodward, Neil Gordon & Ryan Vann. They released the single "Mary" and album "Finnish Tango" both on Cherry Red Records.

A biography of the band called the True Story of the Milltown Brothers (and Jesus Danced Twice) by Nigel Wood was published in August 2025.

The book charts the band's rise from their Lancashire roots to being discovered by Radio One DJ Steve Lamacq, to their international success and their much ignored demise.

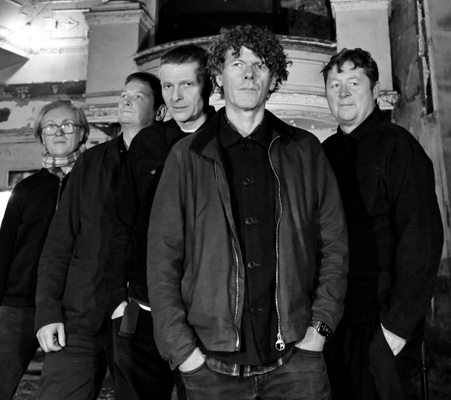
milltown brothers at Burnley Empire Theatre (2024)

== Band Members ==
=== Current ===
- Matt Nelson – lead vocals, acoustic guitar
- Simon Nelson – lead guitar, backing vocals
- James Fraser – bass guitar, backing vocals
- Barney Williams – organ, piano, blues harmonica, backing vocals
- Nian Brindle – drums

=== Touring ===
- Gary Thistlethwaite – lap steel guitar (2015–2024)
- Christian Madden – keyboards (2020)
- Christopher "Biff" Hartley – bass (2004)

== Awards ==
- 1991 NME – Slinky Albums of the Year, No. 46
- 1991 Q Magazine – Slinky, five-star album rating

== Discography ==
=== Studio albums ===
| Title | Details | Peak chart positions | | | | | |
| Title | Details | UK Albums Chart | UK Vinyl Albums Chart | UK Physical Albums Chart | UK Independent Albums Chart | UK Independent Album Breakers Chart | UK Scottish Albums Chart |
|---|---|---|---|---|---|---|---|
| Slinky (A&M) | Released: 1991; Formats: LP, CC, CD | 27 | - | - | - | - | - |
| Valve (A&M) | Released: 1993; Formats: CC, CD | 103 | - | - | - | - | - |
| Rubberband (Rubberband Records) | Released: 2004; Formats: CD | - | - | - | - | - | - |
| Long Road | Released: 2015; Formats: Digital Download, CD | - | - | - | - | - | - |
| Stockholm | Released: 2020; Formats: Digital download, Streaming, CD | - | - | - | - | - | - |
| Boogie Woogie (Last Night From Glasgow) | Released: September 2025; Formats: LP, Digital download, Streaming, CD | 71 | 37 | 66 | 25 | 4 | 9 |
"—" denotes an album that did not chart or was not released.

=== Compilations ===
- More Slinky (A&M, 1991) (Japan only)
- The Best of Milltown Brothers (Spectrum Music, 1997)
- Best Of (Cherry Red Records, 2009)
- Tongue-Tied Mesmerised (Independent Singles + Demos 1987–1990) (2022)

=== Live Albums ===
- Live At St. Mary's (2025)
- Slinky 35 Live (2026)

=== Singles ===
| Year | Title | Chart positions | | Album |
| Year | Title | UK | US Mod Rock | Album |
|---|---|---|---|---|
| 1989 | "Coming from the Mill 1989" (UK only) | — | — | Singles only |
| 1989 | "Which Way Should I Jump?" (UK only) | — | — | Singles only |
| 1990 | "Seems to Me" (UK only) | 181 | — | Slinky |
| 1990 | "Apple Green" | 82 | — | Slinky |
| 1991 | "Which Way Should I Jump?" | 38 | 10 | Slinky |
| 1991 | "Here I Stand" | 41 | — | Slinky |
| 1991 | "Sally Ann" (Non-UK) | — | — | Slinky |
| 1991 | "Apple Green (Dave Meegan Remix)" | 43 | — | Slinky |
| 1993 | "Turn Off" (UK only) | 55 | — | Valve |
| 1993 | "It's All Over Now Baby Blue" (UK only) | 48 | — | Valve |
| 1993 | "Sleepwalking" (UK only) | 97 | — | Valve |
| 2015 | "Long Road" | — | — | Long Road |
| 2020 | "F.I.L.A." | — | — | Stockholm |
| 2025 | "Bring It On" | — | — | Boogie Woogie |
| 2025 | "Grab the Sun" | — | — | Boogie Woogie |
| 2025 | "Time to Move On" | — | — | Boogie Woogie |
"—" denotes single that did not chart or was not released.

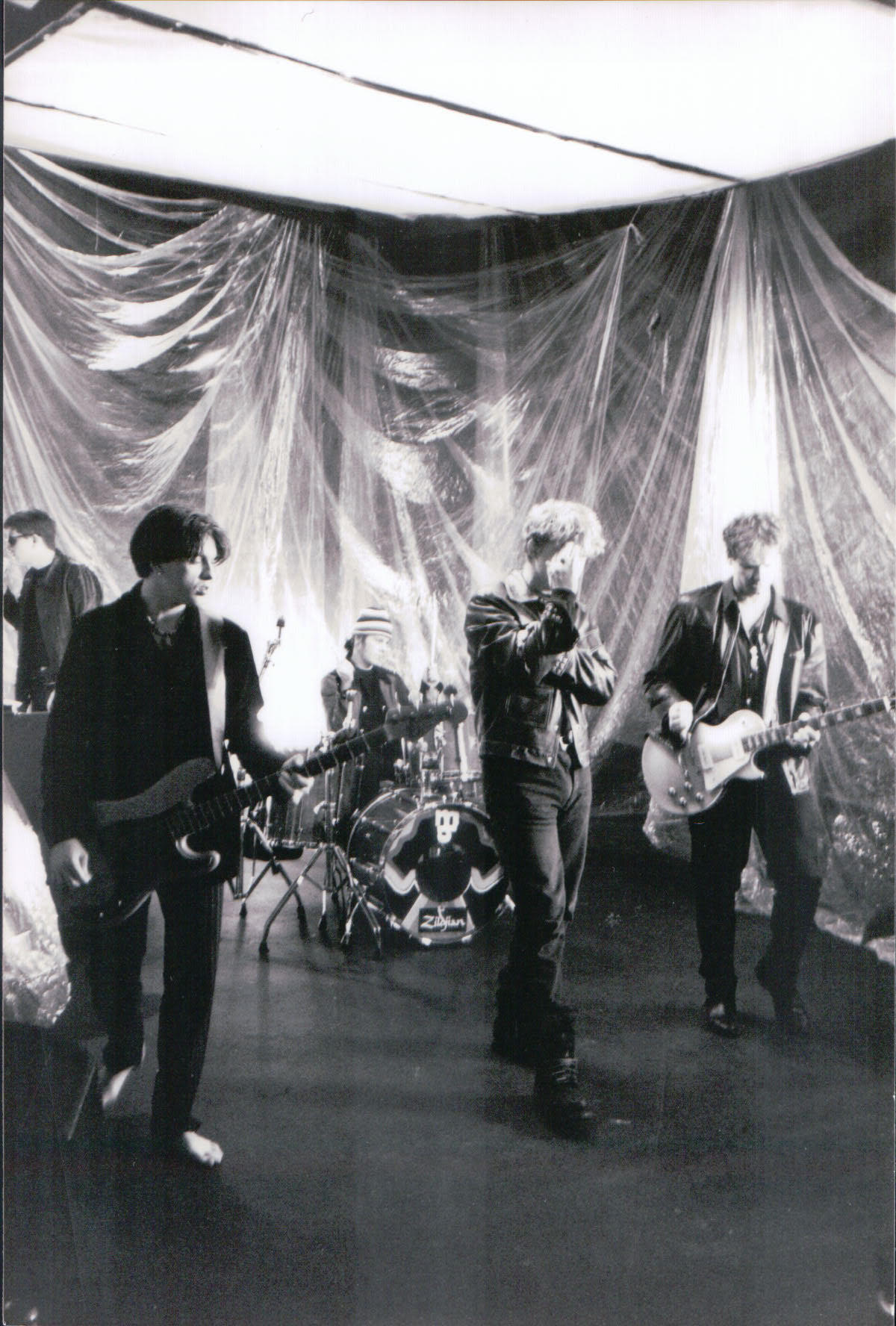
"Turn Off" video shoot, 1993

=== Music videos ===
- "Roses"
- "Apple Green"
- "Apple Green" (Remix)
- "Which Way Should I Jump"
- "Here I Stand"
- "Turn Off"
- "It's All Over Now Baby Blue"
- "Long Road"
- "F.I.L.A."
- "Grab the Sun"

== Bibliography ==
- The True Story of the Milltown Brothers (and Jesus Danced Twice) (2025) by Nigel Wood
