= Liam Frost =

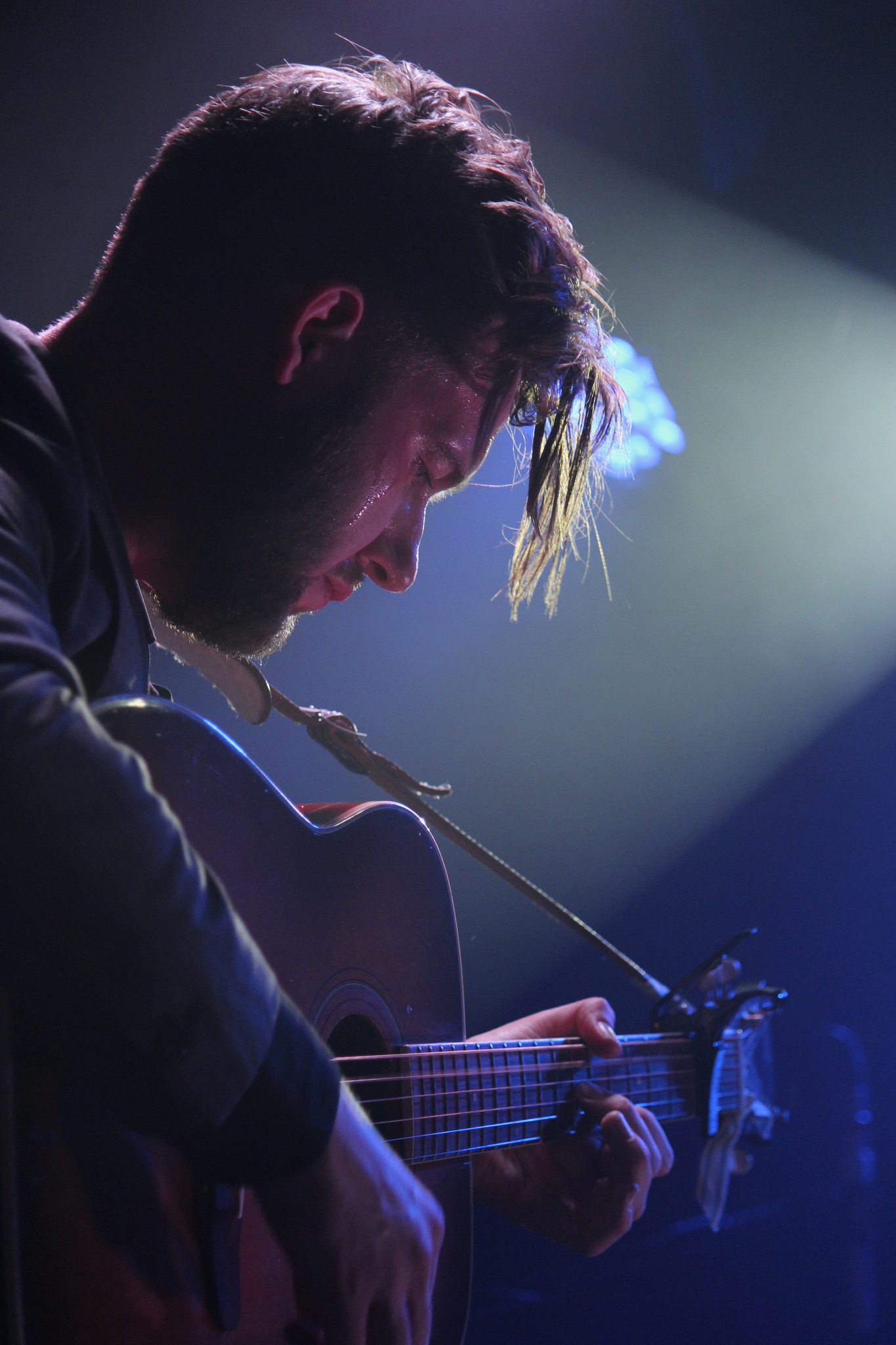
- Frost performing at Manchester Sound Control on 20 January 2014.

Background information
- Born: Liam Pickering
- Origin: Manchester
- Genres: Alternative folk
- Years active: 2006–present
- Labels: Emperor Records; Lavolta Records; Lariato Recordings
- Website: Liam Frost

Liam Frost is a musician from Manchester, United Kingdom. He recorded and played with his backing group 'The Slowdown Family' on his debut album Show Me How The Spectres Dance but now performs solo under the name Liam Frost.

Frost made his live debut at 15 years of age playing gigs at the Akoustik Anarkhy nights at the Star & Garter in Manchester. After a few years singing in punk rock bands, he went solo in 2003 at the age of 20, signing a record deal with Lavolta Records, a subsidiary of Sony BMG, in 2005. He has released music through Sony / Lavolta and his own imprint, Emperor Records but currently releases material via Lariato Recordings. He writes and records both solo material and also performs as part of the band TOKOLOSH.

Frost is described by Guy Garvey (of the band Elbow) as "the UK’s answer to Bright Eyes". His songs are heavily focused on the deaths, ten years apart, of his father and brother and the impact these events had on his life and the lives of those around him.

== Musical career ==
=== With The Slowdown Family ===
In October 2005 Frost played at a tribute gig for the late Radio 1 DJ John Peel along with new band Nine Black Alps. Other acts playing the show at The Night and Day Cafe included I Am Kloot and Badly Drawn Boy.

March 2006 saw Frost performing at the SXSW festival in Austin, Texas and that same year he also played a residency in Manchester's Night and Day Cafe to coincide with the release of his first EP. In 2006 Frost also completed his first headline tour of the UK with his band The Slowdown Family and made appearances at many of the UK festivals throughout the summer. He also shared a stage with Elbow at their Somerset House gig in addition to playing on the same bill as The Decemberists, The Magic Numbers, Willy Mason and Ray Davies.

Frost had spent the early part of 2006 with The Slowdown Family in a London studio with Coldplay producer Danton Supple recording his debut album Show Me How The Spectres Dance. The first four singles were released by Lavolta; the She Painted Pictures EP in February 2006, The Mourners of St Paul's in June and The City is at Standstill in August. "She Painted Pictures" was released as a chart-eligible single in February 2007. Show Me How The Spectres Dance was released on 1 September 2006.

"The Mourners of St Paul's" was voted the No. 1 single of 2006 by Channel 4's Planet Sound.

=== Post Slowdown Family ===
Following the disbanding of The Slowdown Family Frost discovered that Lavolta had become a part of Columbia Records, and his second album would be made for them. He travelled to New York to make the record with Victor Van Vugt at Chelsea's Stratosphere Sound. Upon completion of the album, Frost was dropped by Columbia near the end of 2008. However, he negotiated terms to leave the label with the master tapes of the album.

The album, We Ain't Got No Money, Honey, But We Got Rain, was released in the UK on 28 September 2009 on Emperor Records, Frost's own label. It was titled after a poem of the same name by the poet, novelist, and short story writer Charles Bukowski. It contains several collaborations with singer-songwriter Ed Harcourt, including Your Hand in Mine, and a duet with Martha Wainwright.

=== Radio sessions ===
Frost has performed several live sessions for BBC network radio. On 13 February 2006 he appeared on Liz Kershaw's Radio 2 show as she stood in for Janice Long. On 28 August of the same year he appeared again on Radio 2, on the Mark Radcliffe show. Further sessions took place on digital station BBC 6 Music. Frost performed two sessions for the Marc Riley Show on 2 March 2009 and 17 February 2010 and also a session for Lauren Laverne on 21 January 2010.

On 13 January 2007 Frost appeared on the Radio 3 arts show The Verb where he performed songs and was interviewed about his lyricism by poet Ian McMillan.

=== With TOKOLOSH ===
In 2011 Frost formed a collaborative side project called TOKOLOSH with brothers Christian and Nicky Madden of The Earlies, The Whip's Nathan Sudders and drummer Richard Young. Described by BBC 6 Music DJ Marc Riley as a supergroup, the band played numerous shows, with a debut gig at the historic John Rylands Library Reading Room in Manchester City Centre. On 13 December 2013 they provided support for I Am Kloot at the Manchester Apollo. In September 2014 they appeared at Festival No 6 playing an evening woodland gig and earlier that year they also released their debut album Stay Strong on the Jack To Phono label.

=== Recent solo work ===
2013 saw Frost return to performing solo shows following a break of over two years during which he had been concentrating on working with TOKOLOSH. He played two sell out shows at the International Anthony Burgess Foundation and a show at The Deaf Institute later that year.

In 2014 Frost started working on songs for his unnamed third album and throughout the year he played a number of headline solo shows and support slots which included new material. In July 2014 he provided support for Badly Drawn Boy at a gig which celebrated the life of Manchester Roadhouse co-owner Steve Lloyd and raised money for Manchester's Christie Hospital. Later that year, in addition to several solo dates, Frost played support sets at shows headlined by Cherry Ghost and Liam Fray; frontman of The Courteeners

On 27 October 2014 Frost released tracks from his forthcoming third album, via Lariato Recordings, entitled The Wild Places EP. The EP contained five downloadable tracks: "Who's Gonna Love You", "The Wild Places", "When I'm Alone", an acoustic version of "Who's Gonna Love You" and a cover of Sade's "No Ordinary Love" and a physical copy of the EP was released the following year.

Frost continued to perform live playing regular gigs around the country in 2015. Notable shows included support slots for The Courtneers when Liam Fray asked Frost to perform at two warm up shows which took place in Leeds and Liverpool in the week prior to the band's gig in Manchester's Heaton Park. Frost played full band sets at both these shows. In July he also performed an acoustic set at Band on the Wall as part of a double headliner gig with The Earlies who had reformed to play some shows to mark a decade since their debut album was released.

Later in 2015 Frost announced that he would be undertaking his first UK tour for some years, playing a number of solo and full band dates across the UK and Ireland in October and November. The tour was to coincide with the release of The Courage EP, which would contain more tracks from his forthcoming third album. The gigs went ahead but the new EP was put on hold when Frost announced that his penultimate show of the tour, which took place in Manchester's Ruby Lounge, would be the last live date he would undertake in either Manchester or London for some time for him to focus more on writing.

== Reformation of The Slowdown Family ==
Towards the end of April 2016 Frost made a surprise announcement that he would be reforming The Slowdown Family for a one-off show to mark the 10th anniversary of his debut album Show Me How The Spectres Dance. The gig would see him play the album in its entirety and was arranged for 3 September 2016 at The Deaf Institute in Manchester. Tickets went on sale on 25 April and completely sold out in around two hours. Some fans took to social media to express their disappointment at not securing tickets, so that same week Frost announced that he would play an additional matinee show on the same day at the Deaf Institute and released more tickets, all of which sold out within hours.

== Other work ==
=== Cape Farewell ===
Following the promotion of his first album, in 2007 Frost took part in a sailing expedition known as Cape Farewell, campaigning to raise awareness of climate change. The voyage aboard a schooner took nearly three weeks, crossing the North Atlantic and travelling to Greenland with a crew made up of scientists, writers, artists, musicians and comedians. Despite suffering with sea sickness it was on this trip that Frost began writing material that would make up his second album, including the songs "Shipwrecks" and "Leading Lights and Luminaries".

=== Chaos to Order ===
In November 2014 Frost took part in Manchester Central Library's Chaos to Order residency curated by the band Everything Everything at the newly refurbished library. Frost and fellow musician Sara Lowes spent a week mentoring a group of young musicians between the ages 18 and 25 who were recruited via The Band on the Wall's Brighter Sound project, helping them to create original compositions which were performed live at the library at the end of the residency.

== References in popular culture ==
In 2011, a portrait of Frost was painted by British artist Joe Simpson, and was exhibited around the UK including at Simpson's solo exhibition at The Royal Albert Hall.

== Discography ==
=== Liam Frost ===
Albums

- Show Me How The Spectres Dance (4 September 2006) Lavolta Records
- We Ain't Got No Money, Honey, But We Got Rain (27 September 2009) Emperor Records
- The Latchkey Kid (13 September 2019) AWAL

Singles and EPs

- She Painted Pictures EP (6 February 2006) Lavolta Records
- "The Mourners of St. Paul's" (5 June 2006) Lavolta Records
- "The City Is At Standstill" (28 August 2006) Lavolta (#74 UK Singles Chart)
- "She Painted Pictures" (5 February 2007) Lavolta Records
- "Held Tightly In Your Fist" (13 September 2009) Emperor Records
- "Your Hand In Mine" (featuring Martha Wainwright) (18 January 2010) Emperor Records
- The Wild Places EP (27 October 2014) Lariato Recordings
- The Courage EP (release date TBC)

=== TOKOLOSH ===
Albums

- Stay Strong (1 August 2014) Jack To Phono

Singles and EPs

- "The Hollow" / "Tokohorse" (1 October 2012) Jack To Phono
- "Shapeshifter" / "Bloodlines" (25 February 2013) Jack To Phono
- "The Root" (1 July 2013) Jack To Phono
- "Unknown Animal" (4 November 2013)
- "A Great Wave" (30 May 2014)
