= List of Oasis band members =

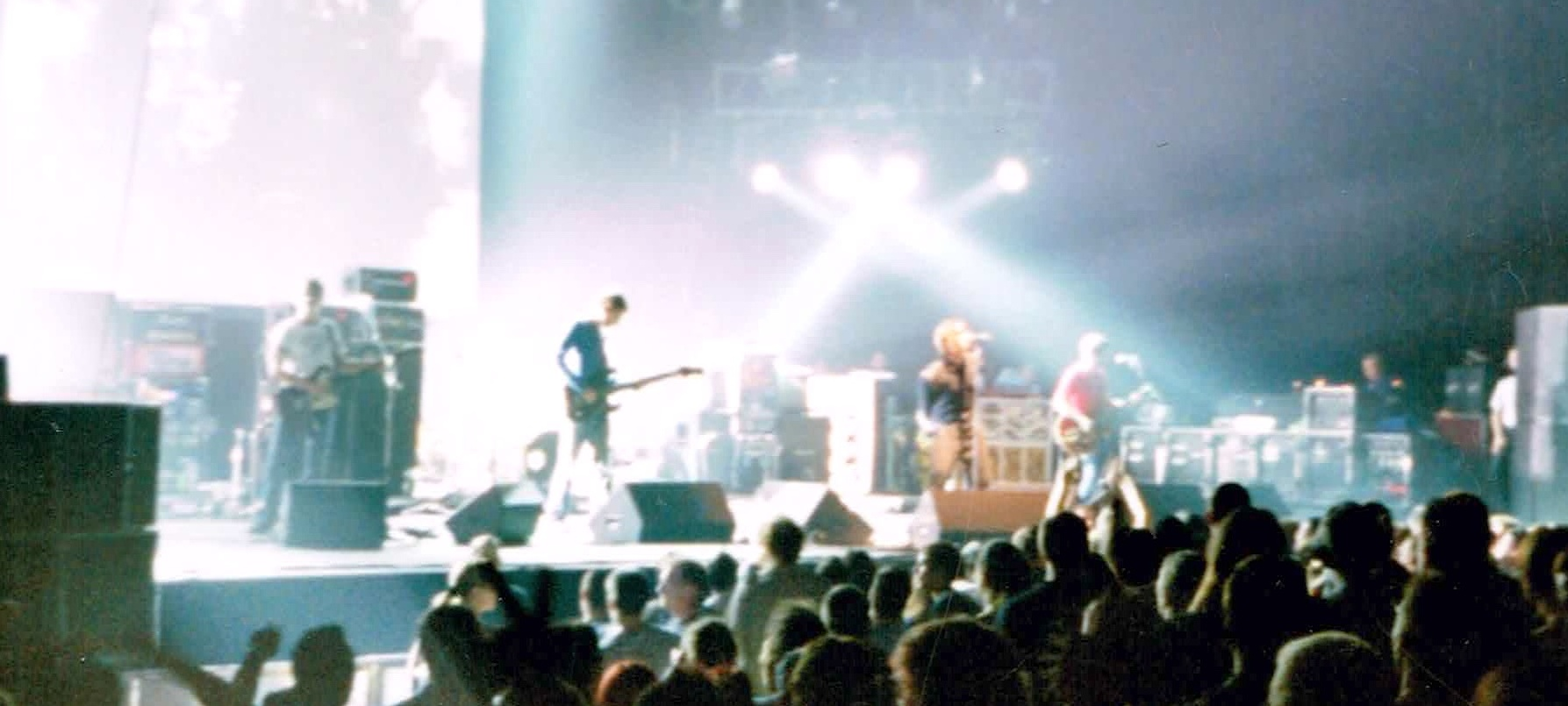
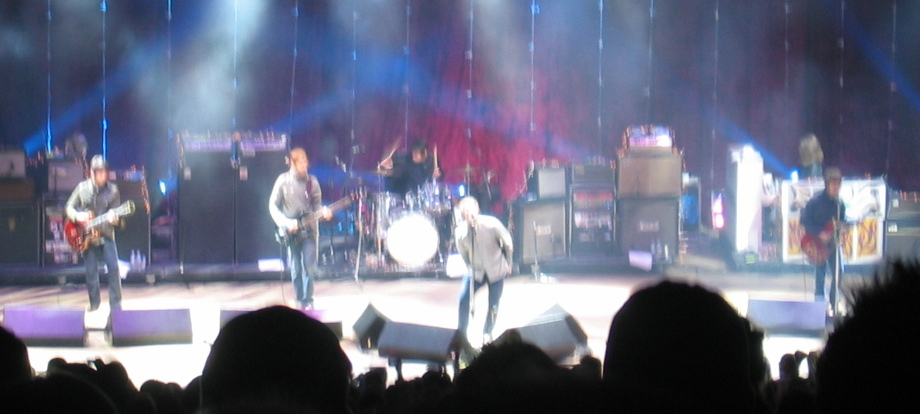
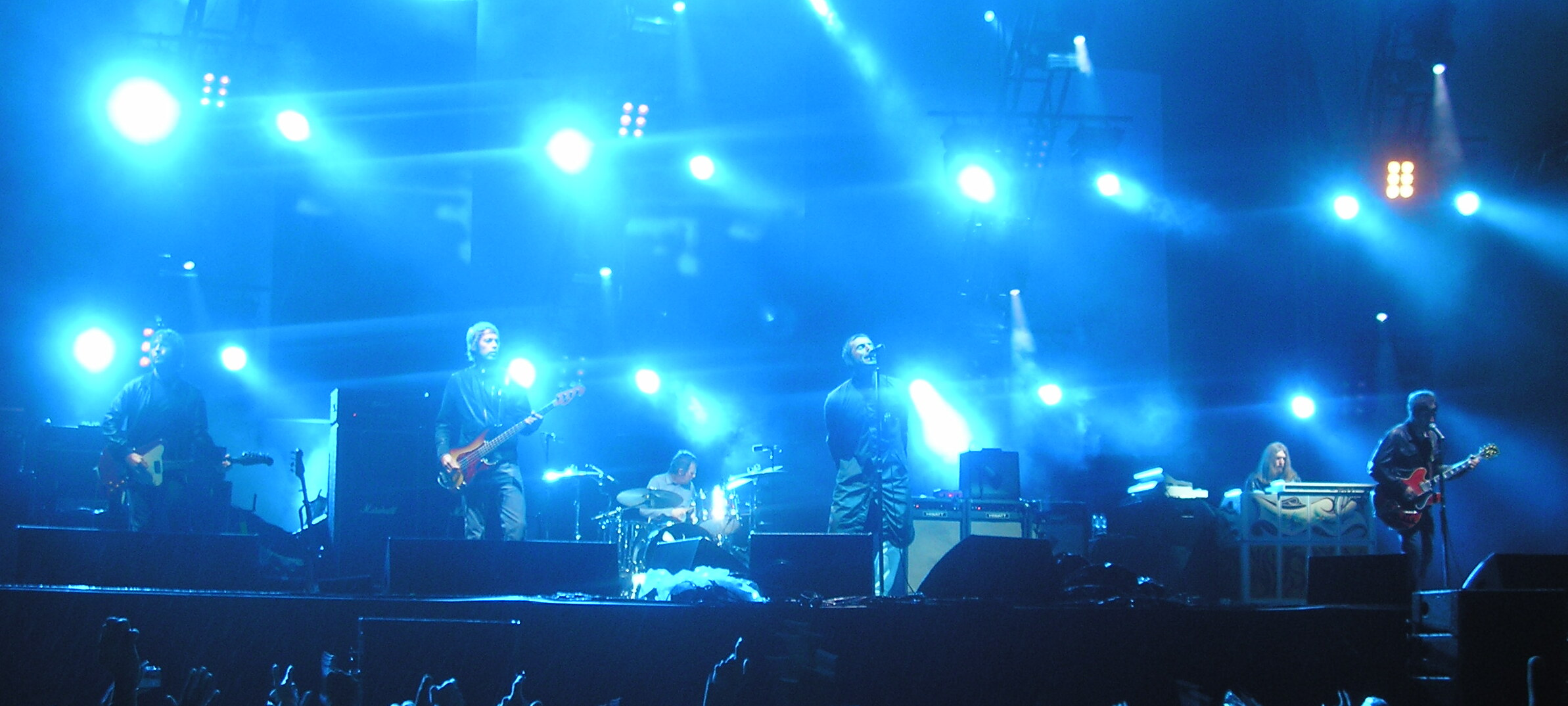
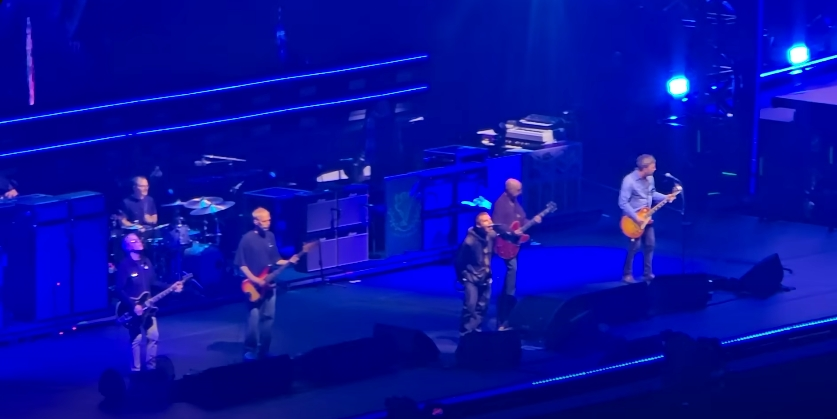
Four line-ups of Oasis performing in 2002, 2005, 2009 and 2025

Oasis are an English rock band founded in Manchester in 1991. The band originally included Liam Gallagher (lead vocals), Paul "Bonehead" Arthurs (guitar), Paul "Guigsy" McGuigan (bass guitar) and Tony McCarroll (drums), who were soon joined by Liam's older brother Noel Gallagher (lead guitar, vocals, main songwriter). The band, who reunited in 2024, currently consists of Liam and Noel Gallagher, Arthurs, guitarist Gem Archer and bassist Andy Bell (both of whom first joined in 1999).

== History ==
In 1991, bassist Paul McGuigan, guitarist Paul Arthurs, drummer Tony McCarroll, and singer Chris Hutton formed a band called The Rain. Arthurs soon replaced Hutton with Liam Gallagher who suggested the band change their name to Oasis. The band's first gig was attended by Liam's brother Noel, a former roadie with Inspiral Carpets, who asked to join the band as lead guitarist and main songwriter.

The band released their debut album, Definitely Maybe, in 1994, which was the only album to feature McCarroll who was ousted from the band in 1995 and replaced by Alan "Whitey" White. White made his debut with Oasis on a Top of the Pops performance of "Some Might Say". The band released their second album (What's the Story) Morning Glory?, in 1995. Shortly before the albums release in September 1995, McGuigan left the band due to nervous exhaustion, his replacement was Scott McLeod who stayed with the band until October when he quit in the middle of a US tour, causing the band to cancel the remainder of the leg. McGuigan returned for the next leg of European shows. McLeod later called Noel to say he regretted his decision.

In 1997, the band were joined by Mike Rowe as touring keyboardist. In 1999, both Arthurs and McGuigan left the band to spend more time with their families. Noel soon approached Gem Archer (of Heavy Stereo) to replace Arthurs, and former Ride guitarist Andy Bell to replace McGuigan, despite having never played bass before. In May 2000, Noel Gallagher quit the band mid tour. To replace him the band were joined by Mother Earth guitarist Matt Deighton on rhythm guitar while Archer took over lead guitar duties. At the end of the tour Noel returned and Deighton left.

For the band's next tour, Zeb Jameson replaced Rowe as touring keyboardist, although Rowe subsequently returned in 2001. Also in 2001, Alan White's brother Steve briefly replaced him on drums. In 2002, former Kula Shaker organist Jay Darlington joined as new touring keyboardist. In 2004, Alan White was asked to leave the band, his replacement was Zak Starkey (son of Ringo Starr and drummer with The Who) as a session/touring member.

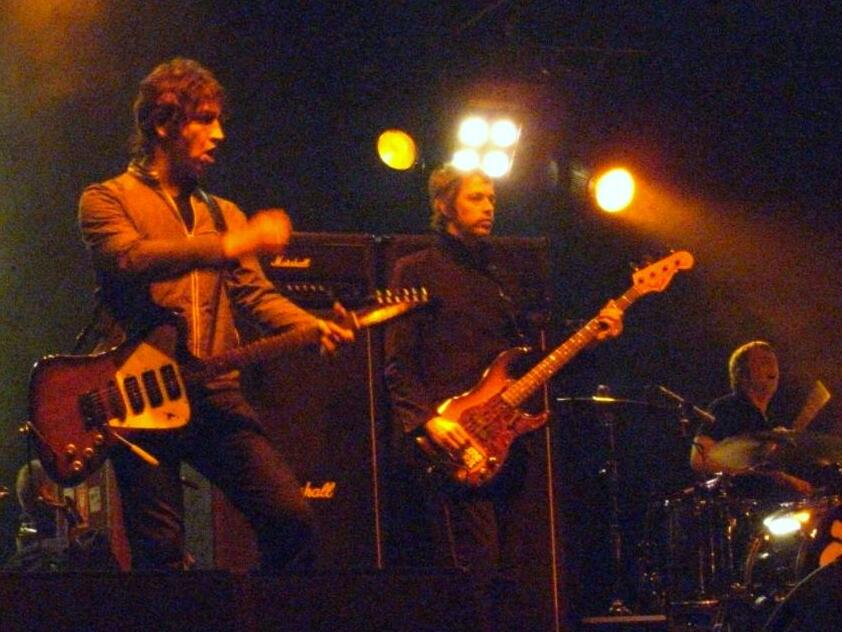
Archer, Bell and Sharrock on the band's Dig Out Your Soul Tour in 2009

This line-up stayed constant until 2008, when Starkey departed the band. His replacement was Chris Sharrock (the La's, the Icicle Works and the Lightning Seeds) who toured with the band until 2009, when they split due to tensions between the Gallagher brothers. Liam subsequently formed Beady Eye with Archer, Bell and Sharrock, while Noel formed Noel Gallagher's High Flying Birds with former keyboardist Mike Rowe, and was later joined by Sharrock and Archer in 2016, following the break up of Beady Eye. In his solo career, Liam regularly collaborated with Arthurs, who also played with Beady Eye when Archer injured himself.

In August 2024, the band announced they were reforming for a tour in 2025. After months of speculation on who else would be returning to the band, the line-up was confirmed to be Arthurs, Archer and Bell, alongside drummer Joey Waronker, keyboardist Christian Madden (both of whom had toured with Liam), trombonist Alastair White, trumpeter Joe Auckland and saxophonist Steve Hamilton (all of whom had toured with Noel). High Flying Birds backing vocalist Jessica Greenfield was also initially announced as part of the touring line-up but did not perform on the tour.

In October 2025, Arthurs announced he was pulling out of the Asian and Australian legs of the tour, to undergo treatment following a diagnosis of prostate cancer earlier in the year. It was later revealed that Mike Moore (whom had toured with Liam) would fill in for Arthurs during those dates.

== Official members ==
=== Current ===
| Image | Name | Years active | Instruments | Release contributions |
|---|---|---|---|---|
| | Liam Gallagher | 1991–2009; 2024–Present | lead vocals; percussion; acoustic guitar (2001–2002, 2007–2008) | all releases |
| | Noel Gallagher | 1991–2009; 2024–Present | lead guitar; backing and lead vocals; rhythm guitar (1999–2009); keyboards (1995–2001, 2007–2008); bass (1993–1994, 1995, 1999); drums (2001–2008) | all releases |
| | Paul "Bonehead" Arthurs | 1991–1999; 2024–present | rhythm guitar; lead guitar (1991); keyboards (1993–1995); bass (1995) | all releases from Definitely Maybe (1994) to The Masterplan (1998); Stop the Clocks (2006); Time Flies... 1994–2009 (2010); Knebworth 1996 (2021) |
| | Gem Archer | 1999–2009; 2024–present | rhythm and lead guitar; backing vocals (2002–2005); keyboards (2002–2008); bass (2003–2008); harmonica (2005–2008) | all releases from Familiar to Millions (2000) onwards, except Knebworth 1996 (2021) |
| | Andy Bell | 1999–2009; 2024–present | bass; rhythm guitar (2003–2008); keyboards (2007–2008) | all releases from Familiar to Millions (2000) onwards, except Knebworth 1996 (2021) |

=== Former ===
| Image | Name | Years active | Instruments | Release contributions |
|---|---|---|---|---|
| | Paul "Guigsy" McGuigan | 1991–1995; 1995–1999 | bass | all releases from Definitely Maybe (1994) to The Masterplan (1998); Stop the Clocks (2006); Time Flies... 1994–2009 (2010); Knebworth 1996 (2021) |
| | Tony McCarroll | 1991–1995 | drums | Definitely Maybe (1994); (What's the Story) Morning Glory? (1995) one track only; The Masterplan (1998); Stop the Clocks (2006); Time Flies... 1994–2009 (2010) |
| | Alan "Whitey" White | 1995–2004 | drums; percussion | all releases from (What's the Story) Morning Glory? (1995) to Heathen Chemistry (2002); Stop the Clocks (2006); Time Flies... 1994-2009 (2010); Knebworth 1996 (2021) |

== Touring musicians ==
=== Current ===
| Image | Name | Years active | Instruments | Release contributions |
|---|---|---|---|---|
| | Joey Waronker | 2025–present | drums; percussion | none |
| | Christian Madden | 2025–present | keyboards | none |
| | Steve Hamilton | 2025–present | saxophone | none |
| | Joe Auckland | 2025–present | trumpet | none |
| | Alastair White | 2025–present | trombone | none |

=== Former ===
| Image | Name | Years active | Instruments | Release contributions |
|---|---|---|---|---|
| | Scott McLeod | 1995 (substitute for Paul "Guigsy" McGuigan) | bass | none |
| | Mark Feltham | 1996 | harmonica | Be Here Now (1997); Standing on the Shoulder of Giants (2000); Knebworth 1996 (2021) |
| | Janette Mason | 1996 | keyboards | Knebworth 1996 (2021) |
| | Mike Rowe | 1997–2000; 2001 | keyboards | Be Here Now (1997); The Masterplan (1998); Heathen Chemistry (2002) |
| | Matt Deighton | 2000 (substitute for Noel Gallagher) | rhythm guitar | none |
| | Zeb Jameson | 2000–2001 | keyboards | Familiar to Millions (2000) |
| | Steve White | 2001 (substitute for Alan "Whitey" White) | drums; percussion | none |
| | Jay Darlington | 2002–2009 | keyboards | Dig Out Your Soul (2008); Time Flies... 1994–2009 live tracks (2010) |
| | Zak Starkey | 2004–2008 | drums; percussion | Don't Believe the Truth (2005); Stop the Clocks (2006); Dig Out Your Soul (2008) |
| | Chris Sharrock | 2008–2009 | drums; percussion | Time Flies... 1994–2009 live tracks (2010) |
| | Mike Moore | 2025 (substitute for Paul "Bonehead" Arthurs) | rhythm guitar | none |

== Line-ups ==
| Period | Members | Releases |
|---|---|---|
| Early – Mid 1991 | Liam Gallagher – lead vocals, percussion; Paul Arthurs – guitars; Paul McGuigan – bass; Tony McCarroll – drums | none – one live gig only |
| August 1991 – April 1995 | Liam Gallagher – lead vocals, percussion; Noel Gallagher – lead guitar, backing vocals, bass; Paul Arthurs – rhythm guitar, keyboards; Paul McGuigan – bass; Tony McCarroll – drums | Definitely Maybe (1994); (What's the Story) Morning Glory? (1995) one track; The Masterplan (1998) six tracks |
| April – September 1995 | Liam Gallagher – lead vocals, percussion; Noel Gallagher – lead guitar, vocals, keyboards, bass; Paul Arthurs – rhythm guitar, keyboards; Paul McGuigan – bass; Alan White – drums, percussion | (What's the Story) Morning Glory? (1995); The Masterplan (1998) remaining tracks |
| September – October 1995 | Liam Gallagher – lead vocals, percussion; Noel Gallagher – lead guitar, vocals, keyboards; Paul Arthurs – rhythm guitar; Alan White – drums, percussion; Scott McLeod – bass (touring) | none – England and part of US legs of (What's the Story) Morning Glory? Tour |
| October 1995 | Liam Gallagher – lead vocals, percussion; Noel Gallagher – guitar, vocals; Paul Arthurs – bass; Alan White – drums, percussion | none – TV appearance |
| October 1995 – August 1996 | Liam Gallagher – lead vocals, percussion; Noel Gallagher – lead guitar, vocals, keyboards; Paul Arthurs – rhythm guitar; Paul McGuigan – bass; Alan White – drums, percussion | Be Here Now (1997) |
| August 1996 | Liam Gallagher – lead vocals, percussion; Noel Gallagher – lead guitar, vocals, keyboards; Paul Arthurs – rhythm guitar; Paul McGuigan – bass; Alan White – drums, percussion; Janette Mason – keyboards (touring); Mark Feltham – harmonica (touring) | Knebworth 1996 (2021) |
| August 1996 – June 1997 | Liam Gallagher – lead vocals, percussion; Noel Gallagher – lead guitar, vocals, keyboards; Paul Arthurs – rhythm guitar; Paul McGuigan – bass; Alan White – drums, percussion | The Masterplan (1998) remaining tracks |
| June 1997 – August 1999 | Liam Gallagher – lead vocals, percussion; Noel Gallagher – lead guitar, vocals, keyboards, bass; Paul Arthurs – rhythm guitar; Paul McGuigan – bass; Alan White – drums, percussion; Mike Rowe – keyboards (touring) | Standing on the Shoulder of Giants (1999) without Arthurs, McGuigan and Rowe |
| late 1999 – 19 May 2000 | Liam Gallagher – lead vocals, percussion; Noel Gallagher – lead and rhythm guitar, vocals, keyboards; Gem Archer – rhythm and lead guitar; Andy Bell – bass; Alan White – drums, percussion; Mike Rowe – keyboards (touring) | none – part of Standing on the Shoulder of Giants Tour |
| 30 May – late 2000 | Liam Gallagher – lead vocals, percussion; Gem Archer – lead guitar; Andy Bell – bass; Alan White – drums, percussion; Mike Rowe – keyboards (touring); Matt Deighton – rhythm guitar (touring) | none – remainder Standing on the Shoulder of Giants Tour |
| late 2000 – January 2001 | Liam Gallagher – lead vocals, percussion; Noel Gallagher – lead and rhythm guitar, vocals, keyboards; Gem Archer – rhythm and lead guitar; Andy Bell – bass; Alan White – drums, percussion; Mike Rowe – keyboards (touring) | Familiar to Millions (2000) |
| January – June 2001 | Liam Gallagher – lead vocals, percussion; Noel Gallagher – lead and rhythm guitar, vocals, keyboards; Gem Archer – rhythm and lead guitar; Andy Bell – bass; Alan White – drums, percussion; Zeb Jameson – keyboards (touring) | Familiar to Millions (2000) |
| May – June 2001 | Liam Gallagher – lead vocals, percussion; Noel Gallagher – lead and rhythm guitar, vocals, keyboards; Gem Archer – rhythm and lead guitar; Andy Bell – bass; Steve White – drums, percussion (touring); Zeb Jameson – keyboards (touring) | Familiar to Millions (2000) |
| June 2001 – mid 2002 | Liam Gallagher – lead vocals, percussion, occasional acoustic guitar; Noel Gallagher – lead and rhythm guitar, vocals, keyboards; Gem Archer – rhythm and lead guitar, keyboards, backing vocals; Andy Bell – bass; Alan White – drums, percussion; Mike Rowe – keyboards (session/touring) | Heathen Chemistry (2002) |
| mid 2002 – early 2004 | Liam Gallagher – lead vocals, percussion, occasional acoustic guitar; Noel Gallagher – lead and rhythm guitar, vocals, keyboards, drums; Gem Archer – rhythm and lead guitar, keyboards, backing vocals; Andy Bell – bass; Alan White – drums, percussion; Jay Darlington – keyboards (touring) | Don't Believe the Truth (2005) unspecified drumless tracks |
| early 2004 – May 2008 | Liam Gallagher – lead vocals, percussion, occasional acoustic guitar; Noel Gallagher – lead and rhythm guitar, vocals, keyboards, drums; Gem Archer – rhythm and lead guitar, keyboards, harmonica, bass, backing vocals; Andy Bell – bass, rhythm guitar, keyboards; Jay Darlington – keyboards (session/touring); Zak Starkey – drums, percussion (session/touring) | Don't Believe the Truth (2005) remaining tracks; Dig Out Your Soul (2008) |
| May 2008 – August 2009 | Liam Gallagher – lead vocals, percussion, occasional acoustic guitar; Noel Gallagher – lead and rhythm guitar, vocals; Gem Archer – rhythm and lead guitar; Andy Bell – bass; Jay Darlington – keyboards (touring); Chris Sharrock – drums, percussion (touring) | none – Dig Out Your Soul Tour only |
On hiatus 2009 to 2024
| Mid 2024 – June 2025 | Liam Gallagher – lead vocals, percussion; Noel Gallagher – lead guitar, vocals; Paul Arthurs – rhythm guitar; Gem Archer – rhythm and lead guitar; Andy Bell – bass | none to date – Oasis Live '25 Tour |
| June – October 2025 | Liam Gallagher – lead vocals, percussion; Noel Gallagher – lead guitar, vocals; Paul Arthurs – rhythm guitar; Gem Archer – rhythm and lead guitar; Andy Bell – bass; Christian Madden – keyboards (touring); Joey Waronker – drums, percussion (touring); Steve Hamilton – saxophone (touring); Joe Auckland – trumpet (touring); Alastair White – trombone (touring) | none to date – Oasis Live '25 Tour |
| October – November 2025 | Liam Gallagher – lead vocals, percussion; Noel Gallagher – lead guitar, vocals; Gem Archer – rhythm and lead guitar; Andy Bell – bass; Christian Madden – keyboards (touring); Joey Waronker – drums, percussion (touring); Steve Hamilton – saxophone (touring); Joe Auckland – trumpet (touring); Alastair White – trombone (touring); Mike Moore – rhythm guitar (touring) | none to date – Oasis Live '25 Tour |
| November 2025 – present | Liam Gallagher – lead vocals, percussion; Noel Gallagher – lead guitar, vocals; Paul Arthurs – rhythm guitar; Gem Archer – rhythm and lead guitar; Andy Bell – bass; Christian Madden – keyboards (touring); Joey Waronker – drums, percussion (touring); Steve Hamilton – saxophone (touring); Joe Auckland – trumpet (touring); Alastair White – trombone (touring) | none to date – Oasis Live '25 Tour |
