= Mansfield High School, Lancashire =

Mansfield High School
- Brierfield; England

Information
- Type: Secondary School
- Closed: June 2006

Mansfield High School was a secondary school for 11- to 16-year-olds, in Brierfield, Lancashire. The school closed in June 2006 as part of the UK Government's Building Schools for the Future project. Edge End High School in neighbouring Nelson also closed its doors at the same time; the enrolled students from these two schools were merged into one and the new Marsden Heights Community College is now the secondary school serving this area.

== Information ==
Mansfield High School comprised five buildings, the Main Building, Weston, Rosla, Onward and Derwent. There were two recreation yards, an indoor sports hall, tennis courts, drama hall and a shared grass sports pitch.

== Academic results ==
Mansfield's GCSE Results for 2005 placed the secondary school well within the country set boundaries, with 43.9% of candidates achieving 5 A*-C grades, 86.9% achieving 5 A*-G grades and 97% achieving at least 1 A*-G grade. Below is a subject breakdown of the schools 2005 GCSE Results (including only effectively compulsory subjects), highlighting the number of students achieving each grade;

-	English Language	English Literature	Mathematics	Science (Double Award)
A*	6	1	1	3
A	28	5	7	14
B	44	30	47	20
C	32	72	56	57
D	32	32	27	41
E	29	21	31	26
F	8	3	11	20
G	8	3	10	19
U	0	3	2	0
5 A*-C	58.8%	63.5%	57.8%	47.0%
5 A*-G	100%	98.2%	99.0%	100%
No.	187	170	192	200

== Notable people ==
- Danny Handley, musician
- Adnan Hussain, politician and solicitor
