= Sara Lowes =

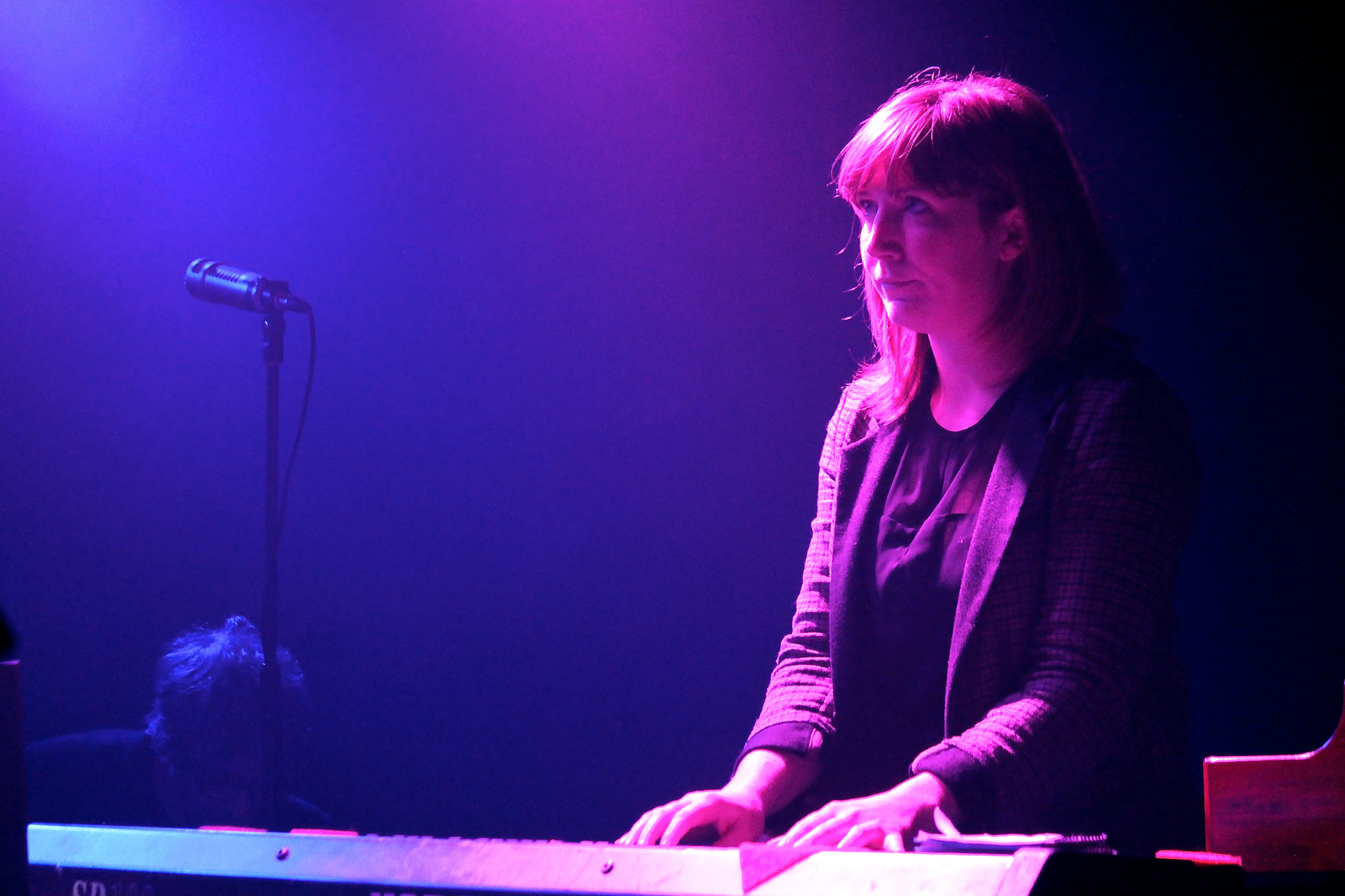
- Sara Lowes performing with the band Bone-Box at Manchester Sound Control on 20 January 2014

Background information
- Born: 2 July 1982 (age 44)
- Origin: Lancashire, England
- Genre: Alternative Folk
- Years active: 2008–present
- Label: Red Deer Club
- Website: www.saralowes.co.uk

Sara Lowes (born 2 July 1982) is an English singer and songwriter based in Manchester, England. She has performed and recorded with artists including Jim Noir, The Earlies, King Creosote and Micah P. Hinson.

== Biography ==
Sara Lowes started writing and recording her own material with Gareth Cousins before joining The Earlies in 2003. The Earlies' first album These Were the Earlies was released in 2005 and in the same year Lowes recorded vocals for Micah P. Hinson's album The Gospel of Progress, which was produced by The Earlies.

The Earlies released a collaboration 7-inch single with The Webb Brothers, with the Webbs' track "I've been Waiting" on one side and Lowes' song "Thomas Danger Hatton" on the other.

In 2006, Lowes started playing keyboards for David Potts, Jim Noir, and on King Creosote's album KC Rules OK. In the same year, she toured as a member of The Earlies live band. In 2007 she sang backing vocals on Windmill's debut record Puddle City Racing Lights. In the same year Lowes joined Half Cousin and sang backing vocals on their second album, Iodine: she also played keyboards live for the band.

After five years of session work Lowes released her first solo mini album Tomorrow's Laughter on Red Deer Club Records in 2008. The album was picked up by Tindersticks who, after hearing Lowes on BBC 6 Music, invited her to support them on their Hungry Saw album tour.

She finished writing a second solo record Back to Creation in 2010. In February 2011 she rejoined The Earlies to back King Creosote a further time and record the live album Lancashire Bits of Strange.

In March 2011, Lowes sang backing vocals for Jesca Hoop's Snow Globe EP. Lowes released her full album Back to Creation in May 2011.

In August 2011, Lowes joined The Earlies once more as backing band to Daniel Johnston. Lowes toured Canada in September and October 2011 supporting Said the Whale, label friends on Hidden Pony Records. At the start of 2012 Lowes travelled to Sweden to meet and play keyboards for Jens Lekman. In April 2012 Lowes joined the live band for Marina and the Diamonds for her second album release Electra Heart and supported Coldplay on the Europe and America tours.

Lowes' album, The Joy of Waiting, was released in February 2015.

== Discography ==
- Tomorrow's Laughter (2008, mini-album)
- Back to Creation (2011)
- All for the Dream (With the Means of a Well Planned Getaway) (2013)
- The Joy of Waiting (2015)
