= Micah P. Hinson =

American Americana singer and guitarist

- Hinson in Manchester, UK (2023)

Background information
- Born: Micah Paul Hinson; February 3, 1981 (age 45); Memphis, Tennessee
- Origin: Abilene, Texas, United States
- Genres: Americana, Country
- Occupations: Singer-songwriter, musician
- Instruments: Vocals, guitar
- Labels: Talitres, Sketchbook Records, Jade Tree Records, Full Time Hobby

Micah Paul Hinson (born February 3, 1981) is an American Americana singer and guitarist and recording artist for Sketchbook Records in the United Kingdom and Jade Tree Records in the United States. His debut album Micah P. Hinson and the Gospel of Progress was released in 2004 to much critical praise. He has also released two EPs; one of early material (2005's The Baby and the Satellite) and the second as The Late Cord with John Mark Lapham of The Earlies (2006 release Lights from the Wheelhouse). The follow-up to his debut, Micah P. Hinson and the Opera Circuit, was released in 2006 and his third album, Micah P. Hinson and the Red Empire Orchestra on July 14, 2008.

== Biography ==
=== Early years ===
Hinson was born in Memphis, Tennessee and shortly afterwards moved with his family to West Virginia while his father completed his PhD. When Hinson was four years old his family settled in Abilene, Texas where his father had secured a professorship at Abilene Christian University. Early in Hinson's childhood his parents would listen to Neil Diamond and John Denver records and instruments such as a little Disney keyboard, a dulcimer and his grandmother's piano were ever-present in the house. Hinson's father bought him his first guitar when he was around 11 years old so that Hinson could perform in a fifth grade talent show. However, it was the influence of his older brother that really sparked Hinson's desire for music. Both the brothers owned guitars and Hinson's older brother quickly became proficient on the instrument, sparking a friendly rivalry. He began his first efforts at making music around age 12 and as he entered his teenage years he began to listen to his brother's Ministry and The Cure records. By the end of high school Hinson's tastes had expanded, and he felt drawn to the sounds of Sonic Youth and Dinosaur Jr. as well as more popular bands like Nirvana and The Smashing Pumpkins.

He felt constrained by the smallness of his hometown, Abilene, and found escape in skateboarding, drugs and playing guitar. Around this period, Hinson met, later member of The Earlies, John Mark Lapham. Around this period Hinson had been declared bankrupt, was homeless and had drug dependencies. However he resolved to change things, later stating that he "had gotten away from some of the shady women and all of this a year or two before [his record deal in 2003]". Hinson found employment, saved up some money and moved to Denton, Texas, beginning a college course there.

=== The Baby and the Satellite ===
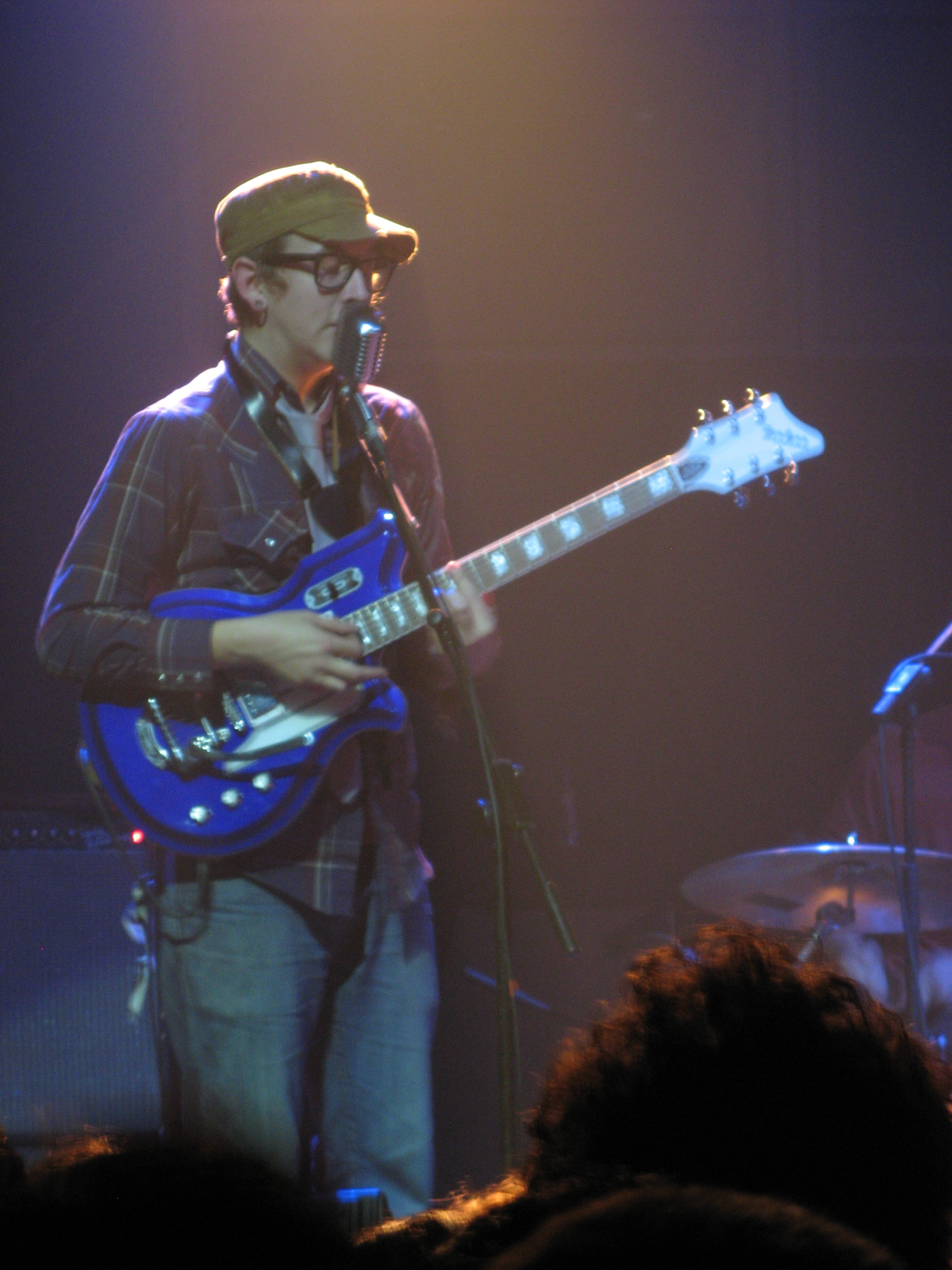
Hinson in 2008

Hinson had recorded his first full demo of material, titled The Baby and the Satellite, around 2000 and Lapham offered to sign Hinson to his label on the strength of the recording. Lapham began jointly promoting The Earlies and Hinson, sending a copy of his demo along with every copy of The Earlies' material. The demo garnered interest from Rough Trade Records and British-based label, Sketchbook Records. However neither company offered him a contract. Lapham remained convinced of the quality of Hinson's work and continued to promote it, slipping a demo of Hinson's "The Possibilities" into the running order of his BBC Radio set. Sketchbook records signed Hinson two weeks later; a year and a half after the company's initial rejection of the artist.

In the winter of 2003, Hinson recorded his debut album, Micah P. Hinson and the Gospel of Progress, produced and arranged by The Earlies under their Names On Records guise. Hinson later stated, "for the Gospel record, I didn't feel like I was that involved", recording only guitar and some piano, "with everybody else kind of doing all the work". The music press made much of Hinson's prescription drug use at the time, claims Hinson later stated were exaggerated. Hinson also explained that that album was "kind of a greatest hits" from the songs he wrote during his teenage years, being the only time he chose between a vast number of songs.

Inspired by positive reviews and finishing his first full album, Hinson set about re-recording his demo of The Baby and the Satellite. The results of the new sessions were released as an EP in early 2005, with a European tour in support of the material. Hinson was playfully punched in the small of his back by a friend, causing back pain that was unalleviated by surgery. This caused problems with the singer's touring schedule and many dates were cancelled.

In 2005, Hinson recorded a cover of "Yard of Blonde Girls" for the tribute album Dream Brother: The Songs of Tim and Jeff Buckley. He also helped produce the record. In July 2006, Hinson formed The Late Cord with John Mark Lapham of the Earlies. Their five track E.P, Lights from the Wheelhouse was released on the 4AD record label.

=== Follow-up albums ===
Hinson released his second album, Micah P. Hinson and the Opera Circuit, in 2006. Micah P. Hinson and the Red Empire Orchestra, Hinson's third album, was released on July 14, 2008, and a tour in support of the album was announced. A new album, Micah P. Hinson and The Pioneer Sabouteurs was released in May 2010. In December 2013, Hinson released a 7" Christmas album, Wishing for a Christmas Miracle with the Micah P. Hinson Family. The album was released via the Yellow Bird Project, with all profits benefiting a children's home in Keller, Texas.

=== Personal life ===
On December 8, 2007, Hinson proposed to Ashley Bryn Gregory at the end of a concert at the Union Chapel in Islington London. They were married in 2008 and have three children. Hinson and Gregory are both of partial Native American ancestry. The two later divorced. As of 2023, Hinson splits his time between Madrid and Denton, Texas, where he visits his children.

During a tour in Spain in Summer 2011, Hinson was seriously injured in a crash when the band's van overturned. He initially continued performing only vocals. After extensive treatment and physiotherapy he regained use of both arms and returned to playing.

Although he has always played a similar music genre, Hinson has claimed that he has never thought ahead about what genre of music he wanted to play.

== Discography ==
Year	Album	Label
2004	Micah P. Hinson and the Gospel of Progress	Sketchbook Records UK; Overcoat Recordings US
2005	The Baby and the Satellite	Sketchbook Records UK; Jade Tree Records US
2006	Micah P. Hinson and the Opera Circuit	Sketchbook Records UK; Jade Tree Records US
2008	Micah P. Hinson and the Red Empire Orchestra	Full Time Hobby
2009	All Dressed Up and Smelling of Strangers	Full Time Hobby
2010	Micah P. Hinson and the Pioneer Saboteurs	Full Time Hobby
2014	Micah P. Hinson and the Nothing	Talitres
2015	Broken Arrows (with T. Nicholas Phelps)	Bronson Recordings
2017	Micah P. Hinson Presents The Holy Strangers (double album)	Full Time Hobby
2018	Micah P. Hinson at the British Broadcasting Corporation	Full Time Hobby / BBC
2018	Micah P. Hinson and The Musicians of the Apocalypse – When I Shoot at You With Arrows, I Will Shoot To Destroy You	Full Time Hobby
2022	I Lie To You	Ponderosa Records
2025	The Tomorrow Man	Ponderosa Records
