= Danny Handley =

British musician (born 1976)

Danny Handley (né Daniel Handley; born 1976) is a British musician. He is best known for his roles as a guitarist and vocalist in the bands Animals & Friends.

Danny Handley on stage during the animals world tour

== Biography ==
Handley was born Daniel Handley in Burnley, Lancashire in 1976. He is a former pupil of Mansfield High School.

From an early age, he was fascinated by the Beatles, Elvis Presley and Chuck Berry. At the age of 11, he bought a copy of a Gibson Les Paul and took guitar lessons from Dave Duxbury in Burnley. By the time he was 13, he was already playing four nights a week in pubs and clubs. He played songs by The Shadows, Chuck Berry, Gene Vincent, Jerry Lee Lewis and Elvis Presley.

Around 1993 Danny formed a band called The Turn with former schoolmate, Chris "Biff" Hartley (guitar), Nick Hudson (bass) & Chris Precious (drums). They were joined on their Turn It Up EP by Barney Williams of milltown brothers fame.

They went on to further collaborate as The Cosmos whose acid-jazz sounds supported Michelle Gayle at Towneley Park in August 1998.

Danny also taught guitar at Nelson & Colne College, where he counted Lucy Zirins among his students.

In 2007 his song Happy Sunny Sunday was included on the charity album Songs From the Neighbourhood; which was released to raise money for Pendleside Hospice and Derian House Children's Hospital in Chroley. The album included the milltown brothers first single, Roses. It also included songs by The Rubbish, Simon Webbe, The Hollies and the former Burnley Building Society song The Best Dreams Begin with B by George Chandler.

In 2008, he formed the Danny Handley Blues Project.

In August 2009, he urgently replaced John Williamson in Animals & Friends, who had just broken his shoulder. Impressed by his performance, the band hired him for their tour of Scotland. Danny joined the band permanently in September 2011, replacing John.

With Animals & Friends, he has played with Steve Cropper and Spencer Davis, among others.

He has also played with The Hollies drummer, Bobby Elliott.

In 2012, he joined Ric Lee's Natural Born Swingers alongside Ric Lee, drummer of Ten Years After, Bob Hall, pianist of Alexis Korner, and Scott Whitley, former bassist of Animals & Friends. The band released an album, Put A Record On.

== Influences ==
His major influences are The Animals, The Rolling Stones, The Beatles, BB King, Chuck Berry, Eric Clapton, Peter Green, Stevie Ray Vaughan, Hank Marvin, Gene Vincent, Jerry Lee Lewis, Barney Williams, Albert King, Freddie King, George Harrison, Steve Cropper and Scotty Moore.

== Discography ==
=== With The Turn ===
- Turn It Up (EP) featuring Barney Williams (1994)

=== As Danny Handley ===
- A Happy Sunny Sunday - (2007 - Songs From The Neighbourhood)
- Two Hundred & Ten - EP (2019)

=== With Animals & Friends ===
- Prehistoric Years (2009)
- The Greatest Hits Live (2013)

=== With Ric Lee's Natural Born Swingers ===
- Put A Record On (2012)
