= Edge End High School =

Former secondary school in Nelson, Lancashire, England

Coordinates: 53.827°N 2.219°W

Information
- Former names: Nelson Edge End Senior Boys' School (1932-1948); Nelson Secondary Technical School (1948-1972)
- Established: October 10, 1932
- Gender: Boys (1932-1948); Co-education (1948-2006)
- Age: 11 to 16

Edge End High School was a secondary school for 11 to 18 year olds until 1972 when it was for 11 to 16 year olds, in Nelson, Lancashire. The school closed in June 2006, as part of the project by the UK Government's Building Schools for the Future. Mansfield High School, in neighbouring Brierfield, also closed at the same time. The enrolled students from these two schools were merged into one, and the new Marsden Heights Community College is now the secondary school serving the area.

== History ==
Edge End opened on 10 October 1932 as Nelson Edge End Senior Boys' School. In 1948, it became Nelson Secondary Technical School, taking both boys and girls. It was renamed Edge End High School in 1972 after comprehensive education was implemented.

== Description and location ==
Edge End High School was a predominantly single storey school, but with two storey buildings to the rear. The school was located due west of the junction of Heights Road and Hibson Road in the Brierfield area of Nelson. There are residential properties at the front of the school on Hibson Road, and a derelict farm and Edge End Hall to the south.

This school initially was under selective education, with passing the 11 or 13 plus exams a necessity until 1972, and eventually became multicultural with predominantly Muslim children attending, although . Martin Burgess was the Headteacher in the 1990s until its closure in 2006. Edge End High School was the first public non-religious school in Lancashire to hold faith meetings every Friday and to build separate toilets where Muslims could perform ablution (wudhu) and pray the Friday Jumma prayer in school.

The school was demolished in 2010 and then in 2014, St Paul's Primary school was built and opened.

== Notable former pupils ==
- David Fishwick, who founded Burnley Savings and Loans
- Lee Ingleby, actor, inspired by drama teacher Brian Wellock, known for Line of Duty
- John Simm, actor known for DCI Sam Tyler in Life on Mars

=== Nelson Secondary Technical School ===
- Eric Knowles, antiques expert on Antiques Roadshow
