= Marsden Heights Community College =

Marsden Heights Community College.
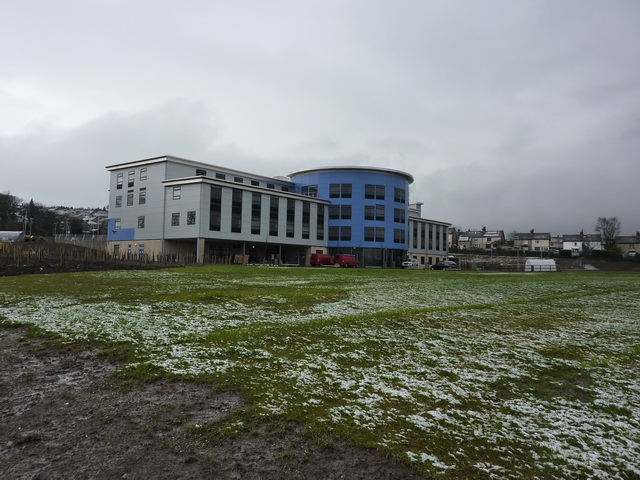

Location
- Brierfield, Lancashire, BB9 0PR; England; 53.8246°N 2.2226°W

Information
- Type: Academy
- Established: September 2006
- Local authority: Lancashire
- Trust: United Learning
- Department for Education URN: 146276 Tables
- Ofsted: Reports
- Headteacher: Alyson Littlewood
- Gender: Coeducational
- Age: 11 to 16
- Website: https://marsdenheights.co.uk

Marsden Heights Community College is a coeducational secondary school located in Brierfield, Lancashire, England.

== History ==
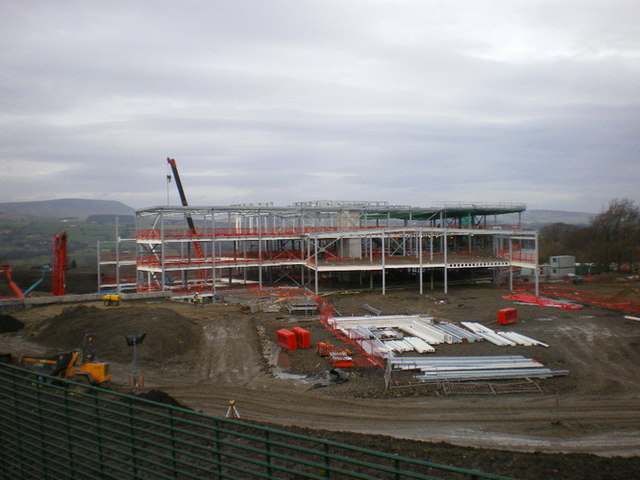
The new school buildings under construction (2009)

The school opened in September 2006, as part of the first wave of a nationwide 10 to 15-year programme of capital investment funded by the Department for Education and Skills called Building Schools for the Future. It currently occupies the sites of the former Edge End High School and Mansfield High School; its new buildings, completed in 2010, are on a single site at the Bent Head playing fields nearby, situated in Brierfield.

Previously a community school administered by Lancashire County Council, in November 2020 Marsden Heights Community College converted to academy status. The school is now sponsored by United Learning.

== School performance ==
In 2011, 45% of Year 11 pupils achieved 5 A* to C GCSE passes (or equivalent) including English Language and Mathematics. The school's value-added measure was 1018.2 (national average 1000), for adding value between the end of Key Stage 2 and the end of Key Stage 4.

As of 2024, the school's most recent Ofsted inspection was in 2023, with an outcome of Good.
