= These Were the Earlies =

These Were The Earlies

Studio album by The Earlies
- Released: 19 July 2004 (UK); 25 October 2005 (US)
- Recorded: 2004
- Length: 51:02
- Label: Secretly Canadian

The Earlies chronology
These Were The Earlies (2004)	The Enemy Chorus (2007)

Professional ratings
Aggregate scores
Source	Rating
Metacritic	84/100
Review scores
Source	Rating
AllMusic	3.5/5 stars
The Austin Chronicle	4/5 stars
Drowned in Sound	8/10
NME	10/10
Mojo	4/5 stars
Pitchfork	7.9/10
PopMatters	7/10
Q	4/5 stars
Uncut	8/10
Under the Radar	9/10

These Were The Earlies is the debut studio album by The Earlies, released in 2004 in the UK before releasing in the US the year later.

== Reception ==
These Were the Earlies received positive reviews from critics. On Metacritic, the album holds a score of 84/100 based on 15 reviews, indicating "universal acclaim".

== Track listing ==
Lyrics: Brandon Carr/John-Mark Lapham. Music: Brandon Carr/Giles T. Hatton/John Mark-Lapham/Christian Madden.

1. "In the Beginning..." – 0:26
2. "One of Us Is Dead" – 5:56
3. "Wayward Song" – 6:16
4. "Slow Man's Dream" – 4:49
5. "25 Easy Pieces" – 4:51
6. "Morning Wonder" – 5:34
7. "The Devil's Country" – 5:50
8. "Song for #3" – 4:15
9. "Lows" – 4:46
10. "Bring It Back Again" – 5:31
11. "Dead Birds" – 2:48
