= Micah P. Hinson and the Opera Circuit =

Studio album by Micah P. Hinson
- Released: 10 October 2006
- Recorded: 2006
- Genre: Indie rock
- Length: 42:20
- Label: Jade Tree Records (USA), Sketchbook Records (UK)
- Producer: Micah P. Hinson

Micah P. Hinson chronology
| The Baby & the Satellite (2006) | Micah P. Hinson and the Opera Circuit (2006) | Micah P. Hinson and the Red Empire Orchestra (2008) |

Professional ratings
Review scores
| Source | Rating |
|---|---|
| Allmusic | link |
| Almost Cool | (6.75/10) link |
| Austin Chronicle | link |
| Being There Magazine | link |
| The Guardian | link |
| The Observer | link |
| Pitchfork Media | (7.4/10) link |
| Prefix Magazine | (8.0/10) link |
| Tiny Mix Tapes | link |

Micah P. Hinson and the Opera Circuit is an album by Micah P. Hinson, released in 2006.

== Track listing ==
1. "Seems Almost Impossible" (Hinson) – 3:40
2. "Diggin a Grave" (Hinson) – 2:07
3. "Jackeyed" (Hinson) – 3:45
4. "It's Been So Long" (Hinson) – 3:02
5. "Drift Off to Sleep" (Hinson) – 4:35
6. "Letter From Huntsville" (Hinson) – 1:54
7. "She Don't Own Me" (Hinson) – 5:40
8. "My Time Wasted" (Hinson) – 2:13
9. "Little Boys Dream" (Hinson) – 4:21
10. "You're Only Lonely" (Hinson) – 5:40
11. "Don't Leave Me Now!" (Hinson) – 5:25

== Personnel ==
- Micah P. Hinson – Acoustic, Electric, Slide and Bass Guitar, Vocals, Banjo, Mandolin, Percussion, Accordion, Organ and Piano
- Charles Lee – Cello
- Nick Phelps – Banjo and Sitar
- H. DaMassa – Harmonica
- Jason Parker – Trumpet
- Chris Holt – Electric and Acoustic Guitar and Fender Rhodes
- Tom Hagerman – Violin and Viola
- Robert Partin – Accordion
- Luke "Dick Burns" Senter – Trap Kit
- Robert F. Johnson – Vocals
- Nathan Sudders – Guitar (Bass)
- Kenton Asche – Trombone
- Jason Kellett – Trap Kit
- Eric Bachmann – Saxophone String and Horn Arrangements
- Micah P. Hinson – Arranger, Producer, Engineer, Sampling, Coordination and Photography
- Tommy Bridwell – Mixing
- Tom Knott – Mixing
- Jeff Holbert – Mixing
- Noel Summerville – Mastering
- Ms. Emily Rupp – Writer
- Madamoiselle Antoinette – Model
