= This Is Ray Stevens =

Studio album by Ray Stevens
- Released: 1963
- Genre: Pop, comedy
- Label: Mercury

Ray Stevens chronology
Ray "Ahab the Arab" Stevens and Hal Winters (1963)	This Is Ray Stevens (1963)	The Best of Ray Stevens (1967)

This Is Ray Stevens is the second album by Ray Stevens. It was released in 1963 by Mercury Records on the catalog numbers of MG 20828 (Mono LP) and MG 60828 (Stereo LP). Like Stevens' previous album, 1,837 Seconds of Humor, all of the songs were written by Ray Stevens and published by Lowery Music Company, Inc. (BMI). The differences between both albums is that Stevens makes an attempt to prove his artistic versatility on this album by including six comical novelty songs and six ballads of serious music.

The back of the album cover gives a description of Stevens' versatility as an artist and adds that a better title for the album would be Both Sides of Ray Stevens. Ironically, 13 years after this album's release, a collection of previously recorded songs entitled Both Sides of Ray Stevens was released. The album then provides information on the themes of the comedy songs and then information on the dramatic ballads.

"Harry the Hairy Ape" is a tale of an escaped ape who likes to scare people in a park, is mistaken by a near-sighted DJ for a rock-and-roll singer, and then begins a music career. "The Weekend" is a song that satirizes how short a weekend is compared with other days; according to the album, Stevens sings it "to the tune of The Whiffenpoof Song." "The Deodorant Song" satirizes commercials about how to "smell pretty." "The Great Sebastian" is a tale of a tight-rope walker of a circus. "Speed Ball" is a tale of a motorcycle rider. "Soap Opera" is a satirization of the tragic, twisted stories in the typical American soap operas and how people can get carried away with them; Stevens acts out all of the roles in the song, which are described in the album as "Nashville's answer to Abe Burrows, Victor Borge and Steve Allen, all rolled into one."

"Funny Man," the first serious song on this album, is described as "Pagliacci and Laugh, Clown, Laugh done in Ray's inimitable style...laughing on the outside and crying on the inside..." and tells the tale of a man who has a reputation for providing laughable entertainment but is heartbroken over being rejected by the woman he loves. "Just One of Life's Little Tragedies" and "Loved and Lost" contains themes of lost love. "Little Stone Statue" tells the tale of a man who knows that his girlfriend now has feelings for another man and he'll lose her soon but will never reveal any emotions. "Teen Years" gives descriptions of meaningful events that make teenagers' lives (from the ages of 13 to 19) so special. "It's Been So Long" tells the tale of a man who regretted breaking up with his girlfriend and living without her causes time to go very slowly.

Three singles were lifted from the album: "Funny Man," "Harry the Hairy Ape" and "Speed Ball." Of the three, "Funny Man" and "Harry the Hairy Ape" proved the most successful chartwise, the former in Canada and the latter in America.

On an interesting side note, Stevens left Mercury in 1965 and signed with Monument Records, where he re-recorded "Funny Man," "Harry the Hairy Ape" and his previous hit "Ahab the Arab." His re-recording of "Funny Man" was included on his third album, Even Stevens (released in 1968), while the re-recordings of the last two songs were included on his fourth album, Gitarzan.

== Track listing ==
Side 1
No.	Title	Length
1.	"Harry the Hairy Ape"	2:47
2.	"Just One of Life's Little Tragedies"	2:26
3.	"The Weekend"	2:29
4.	"Funny Man"	2:33
5.	"Loved and Lost"	1:32
6.	"The Deodorant Song"	2:15

Side 2
No.	Title	Length
1.	"The Great Sebastian"	3:01
2.	"Little Stone Statue"	2:53
3.	"Speed Ball"	2:40
4.	"Teen Years"	2:39
5.	"Soap Opera"	3:00
6.	"It's Been So Long"	2:03

== Charts ==
Singles – Billboard (North America)

Year	Single	Chart	Position
1963	"Funny Man"	Billboard Hot 100	81
1963	"Funny Man"	Canadian RPM Top Singles	14
1963	"Harry the Hairy Ape"	Billboard Hot 100	17
1963	"Harry the Hairy Ape"	Billboard R&B Singles	14
1963	"Harry the Hairy Ape"	Canadian RPM Top Singles	30
1963	"Speed Ball"	Billboard Hot 100	59
1963	"Speed Ball"	Billboard R&B Singles	29
