= The Best of Ray Stevens (1968 album) =

Compilation album by Ray Stevens
- Released: 1968
- Genres: Pop, Novelty, Comedy
- Label: Wing/Mercury

Ray Stevens chronology
The Best of Ray Stevens (1967)	The Best of Ray Stevens (1968)	Even Stevens (1968)

The Best of Ray Stevens is a collection of previously recorded songs by Ray Stevens for Mercury Records. It was released in 1968 by a subsidiary of Mercury called Wing Records. It is not to be confused with the 1967 compilation of the same name. Unlike most of the collections of Stevens' music, this compilation begins with the serious songs of Stevens. The back of the album cover contains an essay by Stuart Lewis that describes Stevens' ability to interpret dramatic songs as much as comedic songs. Lewis' essay begins with comparing this collection with a person, stating that it has two different sides. The A-side of the LP contains five of his serious songs, while the B-side contains five of his novelty songs.

== Track listing ==
Side 1
No.	Title	Length
1.	"Funny Man"	2:33
2.	"Loved and Lost"	1:32
3.	"It's Been So Long"	2:03
4.	"Just One of Life's Little Tragedies"	2:26
5.	"Little Stone Statue"	2:53

Side 2
No.	Title	Length
1.	"Ahab the Arab"	3:45
2.	"Saturday Night at the Movies"	2:42
3.	"Harry the Hairy Ape"	2:47
4.	"Speed Ball"	2:40
5.	"Jeremiah Peabody's Poly Unsaturated Quick Dissolving Fast Acting Pleasant Tasting Green and Purple Pills"	2:22

== Album credits ==
- Writer for all selections: Ray Stevens
- Publisher for all selections: Lowery Music Co., Inc. (BMI)
