= The Best of Ray Stevens (1967 album) =

Compilation album by Ray Stevens
- Released: 1967
- Genres: Pop, Novelty, Comedy
- Label: Mercury

Ray Stevens chronology
| This Is Ray Stevens (1963) | The Best of Ray Stevens (1967) | The Best of Ray Stevens (1968) |

The Best of Ray Stevens is a collection of previously recorded songs by Ray Stevens. The sixth track, "Santa Claus Is Watching You," was electronically re-recorded to simulate stereo.

The back of the album contains an essay by Bob Scherl that explains how Stevens helped change Nashville's reputation from being a marketplace for only country music to that of all types of popular music. The essay mentions how Stevens' breakthrough in the music industry came with the release of "Jeremiah Peabody's Polyunsaturated Quick-Dissolving Fast-Acting Pleasant-Tasting Green and Purple Pills" and then his next hit "Ahab the Arab" helped establish him as a singer and songwriter of the music genres of comedy and novelty. It then tells how Stevens began trying to establish a reputation as a versatile artist after the release of his debut album and has an upcoming single release entitled "Mr. Businessman" (which was released a year after this compilation) and has had his own television series during the summer that temporarily replaced The Andy Williams Show. The essay ends with the quote: "Ray is bound to become more successful than ever before, and this album of greatest hits stands as a permanent monument to his artistic genius." Ironically, at the time of this album's release, Stevens was signed to a label called "Monument Records".

Three singles, "Santa Claus Is Watching You", "Butch Babarian" and "Bubble Gum the Bubble Dancer", make their first album appearance on this collection.

== Track listing ==
Side 1
| No. | Title | Length |
|---|---|---|
| 1. | "Ahab the Arab" | 3:23 |
| 2. | "Funny Man" | 2:33 |
| 3. | "Harry the Hairy Ape" | 2:47 |
| 4. | "It's Been So Long" | 2:03 |
| 5. | "Speed Ball" | 2:40 |
| 6. | "Santa Claus Is Watching You" | 2:17 |

Side 2
| No. | Title | Length |
|---|---|---|
| 1. | "Butch Babarian" | 4:03 |
| 2. | "Loved and Lost" | 1:32 |
| 3. | "The Rock and Roll Show" | 4:22 |
| 4. | "Jeremiah Peabody's Polyunsaturated Quick-Dissolving Fast-Acting Pleasant-Tasting Green and Purple Pills" | 2:22 |
| 5. | "Bubble Gum the Bubble Dancer" | 2:35 |

== Album credits ==
- All selections on this collection were written by Ray Stevens and published by Lowery Music Co. (BMI).
