= The Enemy Chorus =

Studio album by The Earlies
- Released: 23 January 2007
- Length: 47:07
- Label: Secretly Canadian

The Earlies chronology
These Were The Earlies (2004)	The Enemy Chorus (2007)

The Enemy Chorus is the second album by The Earlies, released in 2007.

== Reception ==
Professional ratings
Aggregate scores
Source	Rating
Metacritic	67/100
Review scores
Source	Rating
AllMusic	3.5/5 stars
Drowned in Sound	6/10
Filter	83%
The Guardian	3/5 stars
musicOMH	4/5 stars
Pitchfork	6.7/10
PopMatters	9/10 stars
Tiny Mix Tapes	2/5 stars

The Enemy Chorus received positive reviews from critics, although not as favorable compared to their debut album. On Metacritic, the album holds a score of 67/100 based on 23 reviews, indicating "generally favorable reviews".

== Track listing ==
1. "No Love In Your Heart" – 4:53
2. "Burn The Liars" – 2:44
3. "Enemy Chorus" – 4:12
4. "The Ground We Walk On" – 4:31
5. "Bad Is As Bad Does" – 5:46
6. "Gone For The Most Part" – 4:13
7. "Foundation And Earth" – 5:26
8. "Little Trooper" – 4:40
9. "Broken Chain" – 3:17
10. "When The Wind Blows" – 4:02
11. "Breaking Point" – 5:23
