= Burnley Building Society =

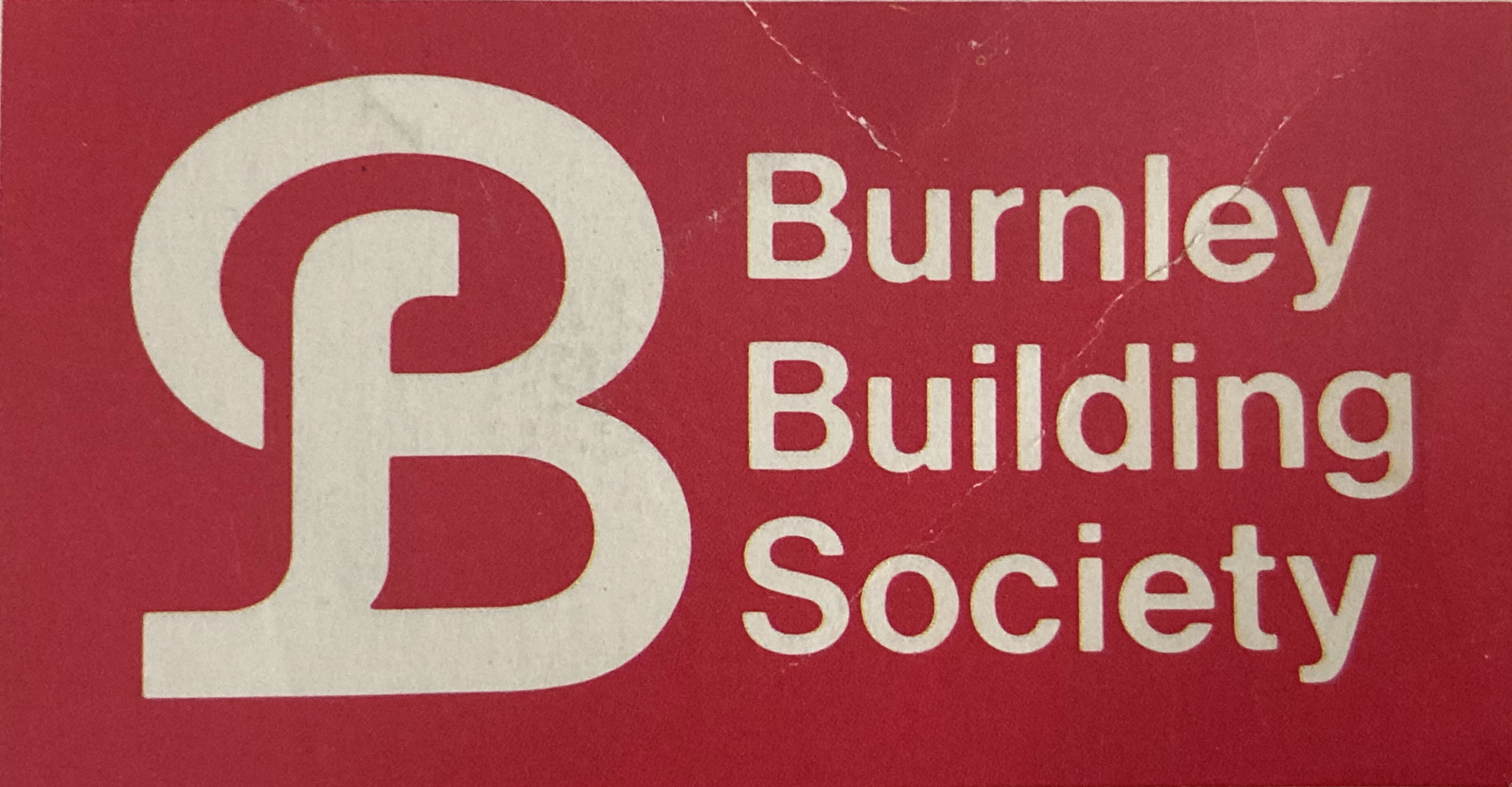
- Company type: Building Society (Mutual)
- Industry: Banking; Financial services
- Founded: 1850
- Defunct: 1984
- Fate: Merger with Provincial Building Society
- Successor: National & Provincial
- Headquarters: Burnley, Lancashire, England
- Products: Savings, Mortgages, Investments, Loans, Insurance
- Total assets: > £1,000 million (1982)

The Burnley Building Society, incorporated in Burnley in 1850, was, by 1911, not only "by far the largest in the County of Lancashire... but the sixth in magnitude in the kingdom". Their motto was By Service We Progress.

== History ==
The Burnley Building Society was founded as a permanent Building Society named the Burnley Benefit Building Society. The town had previously had "terminating societies" which were wound up once they had reached their goals. The earliest of these being the Hall Union Club prior to 1800 and Burnley Benefit Society in 1815.

In 1968 it merged with the Borough Land and Building Society, another Burnley Society which, in 1911, was described as "by far the largest Building Society registered under the Industrial and Friendly Societies Acts".

In 1952 it had assets exceeding £32 million rising above £195 million by 1969 and it had surpassed £1,000 million by 1982.

Burnley Building Society (which also included the Whitehaven and Westmorland Building Societies) and Provincial Building Society merged in 1984 to become National & Provincial Building Society.

Lord Charles Geoffrey Nicholas Kay-Shuttleworth, 5th Baron Shuttleworth KG, KCVO had been appointed as a director of Burnley Building Society in 1979 and subsequently became chairman of the newly formed National & Provincial and later deputy chairman of Abbey National.

On 4 August 1996 Abbey National took over the National and Provincial Building Society and shortly afterwards began to make arrangements for the disposal of the records of that Society and its predecessors which were stored at its offices in Parker Lane, Burnley.

== Premises and Branches ==
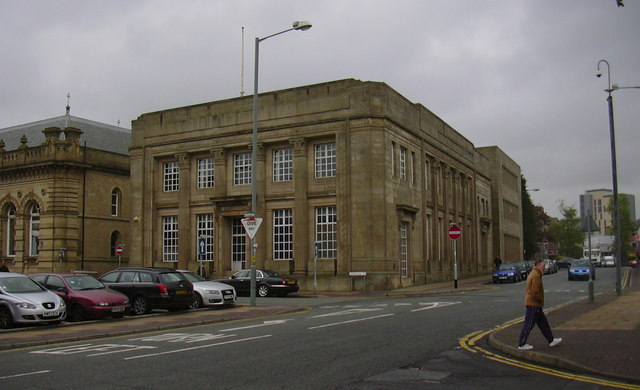
Former Burnley Building Society head office in the town centre

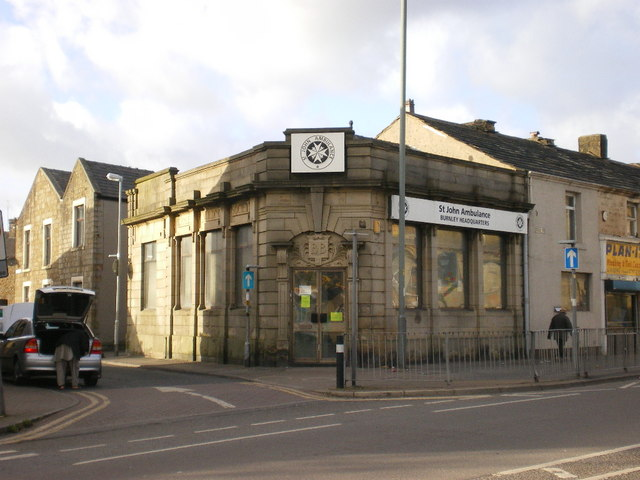
Former office at Duke Bar

The former headquarters were located on the corner of Parker Lane and Grimshaw Street, Burnley in a Grade II listed office block, built 1927–1930 to the designs of architects Briggs and Thornley.

An example of a sculpted Burnley Building Society coat of arms is still in-situ above the entrance to a former branch, currently Cafe Nero at 16 Davy Gate in York, Yorkshire. The coat of arms shares several similarities with the former Burnley County Borough coat of arms; namely the red chevron representing the rivers Calder & Brun along with Bees and cotton plants representing the town's cotton industry.

An edition of The Times newspaper from Friday November 7, 1969 shows an advert stating that London offices were located at 129 Kingsway WC2 presently a Boots store and 2 Hanover Street W1.

A branch was located on Bradshaw Gate, Bolton, Lancashire.

== Advertising and Promotion ==
“Build the world you want . . . with The Burnley” was used as a newspaper advert tagline in 1972.

In the late 1970s the Burnley Building Society produced a promotional 7-inch single titled "The Best Things Begin With B" recorded at Good Earth Studios. It was performed by George Chandler and lyrics were written by Salman Rushdie.

Blackpool Transport's illuminated rocket which was launched in 1961 was sponsored by the Burnley Building Society around the late 1970s to early 1980s. The tram was emblazoned with an illuminated Burnley Building Society logo on the front and the side and carried a giant rocket that said "Go Up In The World With The Burnley."

Promotional Filmography
Year	Title
1972	Burnley Building Society (30 Sec Version)
1975	Burnley Building Society: Your Pound
1976	Burnley Building Society: Your Pound - Revised
1980	Burnley Building Society: Disco
1981	Burnley Building Society: Red Carpet

== See also ==
- Listed buildings in Burnley
