= The Earlies =

Musical group

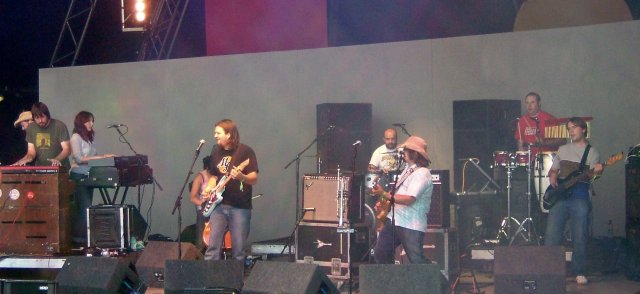
- The Earlies performing at Summer Sundae in 2005

Background information
- Origin: Burnley, Lancashire, England and Texas, U.S.
- Genres: Psychedelia, progressive rock, electronic
- Years active: 2004–2008 (hiatus), 2015, 2025
- Labels: Names/679, Secretly Canadian, Grönland
- Members: Brandon Carr; John Mark Lapham; Christian Madden; Giles Hatton

The Earlies are a band formed by Christian Madden and Giles Hatton from Lancashire, England, and Brandon Carr and John Mark Lapham from the United States. They are notable for blending elements from a wide range of musical genres and have been described as both "a very English kind of folk-psychedelia... with a smattering of Beach Boys harmonies" by The Independent, and "country-meets-prog-meets-electronica symphonies" by The Guardian. NME described them as "psychedelic electro-mind meld".

In the late 1990s, prior to his Earlies days, Lapham released ambient electronic music under the name Autio, on Manchester record label Beatnik Records. Hatton recorded as Atomic Clock for the same label.

The band are notable for using a large live line-up consisting of 11 members who play an eclectic range of instruments, including the flute, tuba, cello, a set of turntables and a synthesizer, alongside the more traditional rock instruments. The full line-up of the band in its original incarnation last played live headlining the Green Man Festival in 2007.

Carr took an indefinite break from the band to teach at ATEMS High School in Abilene, Texas, although he is no longer listed as a faculty member as of 31 December 2020.

In 2015, after a long hiatus, The Earlies returned with new material and live appearances. The band performed a one-off festival show at the fifth Cloudspotting Festival in England, followed by a short tour of the UK. A new EP, Message from Home, was released in 2015.

The Earlies played and produced parts of Jinnwoo's debut album, Strangers Bring Me No Light, released in September 2016.

They performed a full-band one-off show with King Creosote on 11 October 2025 at Hackney Church, to recognise the 20th anniversary of their album These Were The Earlies, as he also celebrated 20 years of KC Rules OK. Both albums were newly released in expanded versions. Also appearing on the night was one-time collaborator Alela Diane, whom they joined for a few tracks on the night.

== Discography ==
=== Albums ===
- These Were the Earlies (2005)
- The Enemy Chorus (2007)

=== EPs ===
- Message from Home (2015)

=== Chart singles ===
- "Morning Wonder" (2004) - UK #67
- "Bring It Back Again" - UK #61

The band also recorded a cover of Tim Buckley's "I Must've Been Blind", for the 2005 tribute album Dream Brother: The Songs of Tim and Jeff Buckley.
