= The Shape I'm In =

The Shape I'm In may refer to:

- "The Shape I'm In" (The Band song)
- "The Shape I'm In" (Joe Nichols song)
- "The Shape I'm In", song by Johnny Restivo
- "Shape I'm In" (Jo Jo Zep & The Falcons song), a single by Jo Jo Zep & The Falcons from 1979
- "Shape I'm In", a song by Arc Angels on the album Arc Angels
- Shape I'm In: The Complete Anthology, a greatest hits album by Jo Jo Zep & The Falcons, 1997
