= Restivo =

Restivo is an Italian surname. Notable people with the surname include:

- Carl Restivo, American musician
- Danilo Restivo (born 1972), Italian convicted of murders in Italy and the UK
- Franco Restivo (1911–1976), Italian politician
- Johnny Restivo (born 1943), American rock and roll vocalist
- Matteo Restivo (born 1994), Italian swimmer
- Sal Restivo (born 1940), American sociologist of science
- Tommy Restivo, American football player and coach
