= Grammy Award for Best New Artist =

Honor presented to recording artists

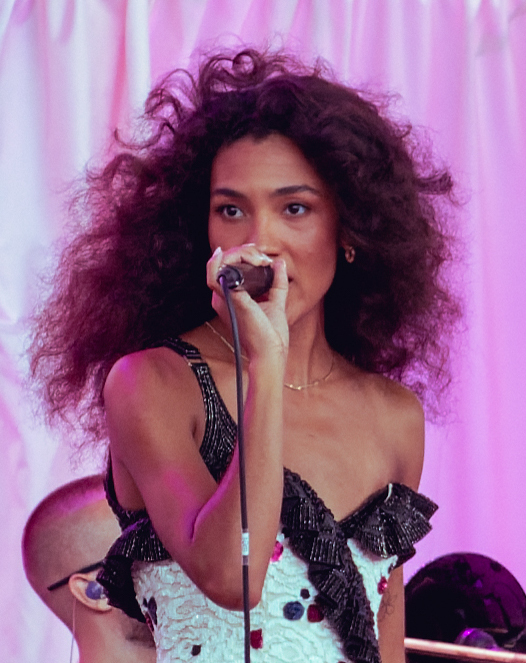
- Olivia Dean is the most recent recipient
- Country: United States
- Presented by: National Academy of Recording Arts and Sciences
- First award: 1960
- Currently held by: Olivia Dean (2026)
- Website: grammy.com

The Grammy Award for Best New Artist has been awarded since the 2nd Annual Grammy Awards in 1960 (except in 1967) "for a new artist who releases, during the Eligibility Year, the first recording which establishes the public identity of that artist." Since 2022, the award is presented by the previous year's winner during the televised ceremony. Since 2022, the current winner also participates in the Nominations Announcement livestream for the following year's ceremony in November.

The Best New Artist award has a reputation for being given to artists whose music industry success ends up being short-lived; it is sometimes asserted, with varying degrees of sincerity, that the award itself brings a curse. This viewpoint was expressed by Taffy Danoff, a former member of Starland Vocal Band (known for "Afternoon Delight"), in an interview for VH1's 100 Greatest One Hit Wonders: "We got two of the five Grammys – one was Best New Artist. So that was basically the kiss of death and I feel sorry for everyone who's gotten it since."

The category is also notable for being the only category to date in which a Grammy Award has been revoked: this occurred in 1990, when Milli Vanilli originally won the award, but band members Fab Morvan and Rob Pilatus later admitted that they did not contribute their own vocals on their album Girl You Know It's True. The award was subsequently vacated.

== Further information ==
Of the 65 acts who have won the award since its inception, 34 are solo female artists, 19 are duos or groups, and 12 are solo male artists. Of the solo male artists, half were given the award in its first decade; since 1970, only six solo male artists have won the award, the most recent being Chance the Rapper in 2017. From 1997 to 2003, and again from 2018 to 2025, all the winners were solo female artists.

Only five artists have won both Best New Artist and Album of the Year in the same year: Bob Newhart in 1961, Christopher Cross in 1981, Lauryn Hill in 1999, Norah Jones in 2003, and Billie Eilish in 2020. Of these, Cross, Jones, and Eilish had songs winning Record of the Year and Song of the Year for the same year, with Cross as the sole songwriter, Eilish as co-writer, and Jones lacking songwriting credit, which therefore made her miss out on completing the single year big four Grammy achievement, a feat that only Cross and Eilish attained; while Adele was the only artist to win all General field Grammys from separate occasions. Only two artists have lost Best New Artist yet won Album of the Year in the same year: Vaughn Meader in 1963 and Alanis Morissette in 1996.

For the award's first several years of existence, comedians and comic acts were regularly nominated, and one, Bob Newhart, won the award. However, this ended abruptly after 1963, and since then, only one comedian has been nominated for the award: Robin Williams in 1980. (That same year, the semi-comic act The Blues Brothers was also nominated.) Of all the winners, only three have been country artists. In 1997, LeAnn Rimes became the first country artist and (at age 14) the youngest artist to win the award. She was followed by Carrie Underwood in 2007 and Zac Brown Band in 2010. Additionally, 2017 marked the first time that two country artists were nominated in this category in the same year, in which Maren Morris and Kelsea Ballerini were both nominated. In 1990, Tone Lōc became the first rap artist to be nominated. In 2012, Skrillex became the first electronic-music artist to be nominated.

Eleven female rappers have been nominated for the award; Neneh Cherry, Lauryn Hill, Nicki Minaj, Iggy Azalea, Saweetie, Latto, Ice Spice and Doechii; with 2021 marking the first time that multiple female rappers were nominated in the same year, when Chika, Doja Cat and Megan Thee Stallion were all nominated. Hill and Megan Thee Stallion are the only winners.

The Judds, Indigo Girls, Wilson Phillips, SWV, The Chicks, Haim, Chloe x Halle, Katseye and The Womack Sisters are the only all-female groups to be nominated for the award.

The Beatles, Tom Jones, Graham Nash of Crosby, Stills & Nash; Culture Club, Sade, Amy Winehouse, Adele, Sam Smith, Dua Lipa and Olivia Dean are the only British or English winners. Anne Murray, Men Without Hats, Corey Hart, Glass Tiger, Crash Test Dummies, Shania Twain, Alanis Morissette, Nelly Furtado, Avril Lavigne, Feist, Drake, Justin Bieber, Alessia Cara and Kaytranada are the only Canadian artists to be nominated with Cara winning in 2018, the only woman to win a major category that year. Sheena Easton and Big Country are the only Scottish artists to be nominated, with Easton winning in 1981. Lana Cantrell, Men at Work, Natalie Imbruglia, Iggy Azalea, Courtney Barnett and The Kid Laroi are the only Australian artists to be nominated, with Men at Work winning in 1983. The Swingle Sisters and Domi Louna from Domi & JD Beck; are the only French artists to be nominated, with the former winning in 1966, also the first foreign act to do so.

Astrud Gilberto, Antonio Carlos Jobim, Eumir Deodato, Morris Albert and Anitta are the only Brazilian artists to be nominated. Ann-Margret, Neneh Cherry and Ace of Base are the only Swedish artists to be nominated. Andrea Bocelli and Måneskin are the only Italian artists to be nominated.

In 1960, Mavis Rivers became the first Samoan and female artist to be nominated. In 1961, Miriam Makeba became the first South African to be nominated. In 1966, Horst Jankowski became the first German to be nominated. In 1969, José Feliciano became the first Puerto Rican and blind artist to be nominated and win the award. In 1986, A-ha became the first Norwegian artists to be nominated while Sade became the first Nigerian to be nominated and win. In 1993, Jon Secada became the first Cuban to be nominated. In 2004, Sean Paul became the first Jamaican to be nominated. In 2012, Nicki Minaj became the first Trinidadian to be nominated. In 2020, Rosalía became the first Spanish and first all Spanish-language artist to be nominated. In 2021, Kaytranada became the first Haitian to be nominated. In 2022, Arooj Aftab became the first Pakistani to be nominated. In 2026, Sophia, Yoonchae and Manon from Katseye, became the first Philippine, South Korean and Swiss artists to be nominated.

1984 marked the first time that all of the nominees were from outside the United States (winner Culture Club, Eurythmics, Musical Youth, and Big Country were from the United Kingdom, and Men Without Hats were from Canada).

Natalie Cole, A Taste of Honey, Jody Watley, Tracy Chapman, Mariah Carey, Arrested Development, Toni Braxton, Lauryn Hill, Alicia Keys, John Legend, Esperanza Spalding, Chance the Rapper, Megan Thee Stallion, Samara Joy and Victoria Monét are the only African Americans to win the award.

Boy George of Culture Club, Tracy Chapman, Sam Smith, Billie Eilish, Megan Thee Stallion, Victoria Monét, and Chappell Roan are the only LGBT+ artists to win the award.

David Crosby and Carl Palmer hold the distinction of being the only artists to be nominated twice for this award. Palmer was nominated both times as a member of a supergroup: Emerson, Lake & Palmer and Asia, while Crosby was nominated as a member of The Byrds and won as a member of the supergroup Crosby, Stills & Nash.

Eight artists who have been nominated for Best New Artist have later been awarded the Grammy Lifetime Achievement Award: The Beatles (1965, 2014), Chicago (1970, 2020), Cream (1969, 2006), Jefferson Airplane (1968, 2016), Antônio Carlos Jobim (1965, 2012), Led Zeppelin, (1970, 2005), Leontyne Price (1961, 1989), and John Prine (1972, 2020).

== Process ==
From 1995 to 2021, members of the National Academy of Recording Arts and Sciences nominated their choices for the best new artist. A list of the top twenty artists was given to the Nominations Review Committee, a specially selected group of anonymous members, who initially selected the top five artists to gain a nomination in the category in a special ballot; the number of nominated artists was increased to eight in 2018. The rest of the members then vote on a winner from the final nominees. In 2021, it was announced that the Nomination Review Committees would be disbanded, and the final nominees for best new artist would be decided by votes from members. Starting in 2022, the number of nominees in the category increased to 10. However, the decision to expand the number of nominees in this category was made 24 hours before the nominees were announced after an early version of the nominations list had already been circulated. This allowed Baby Keem and Arooj Aftab to be nominated as they were the artists who received the most votes besides the other eight nominees. As of the 2024 ceremony, the number of nominees has been reduced to eight.

== Rules changes ==
Over the years, the eligibility rules for this category have changed several times. In 2010, Lady Gaga's exclusion from the Best New Artist category caused the Recording Academy to change eligibility requirements for the next ceremony. She was ineligible for the nomination because her hit "Just Dance" had been nominated in 2008. The new rule stated that an artist may be nominated as long as that artist has not previously released an entire album and has subsequently not won a Grammy. In June 2016, the Grammy organization amended the Best New Artist rules once again, to remove the album barrier "given current trends in how new music and developing artists are released and promoted". To be eligible in the category of Best New Artist, the artist, duo, or group:

- Must have released a minimum of five singles/tracks or one album (until 2020 there was a maximum of 30 singles/tracks or three albums, but this maximum limit was removed for the 2021 awards season)
- May not have entered into this category more than three times, including as a performing member of an established group.
- Must have achieved a breakthrough into the public consciousness and impacted the musical landscape during the eligibility period.

These new rules were put in effect with the 59th Annual Grammy Awards. The category was then expanded to include eight nominees in 2019. Starting in 2021, screening committees were charged with determining whether the artist had attained a breakthrough or prominence prior to the eligibility year. Such a determination would result in disqualification. As of the 69th Annual Grammy Awards, an artist is allowed to submit up to a maximum of four times overall for the category, instead of three.

== Recipients ==
Years reflect the year in which the Grammy Awards were handed out, for records released in the previous year.

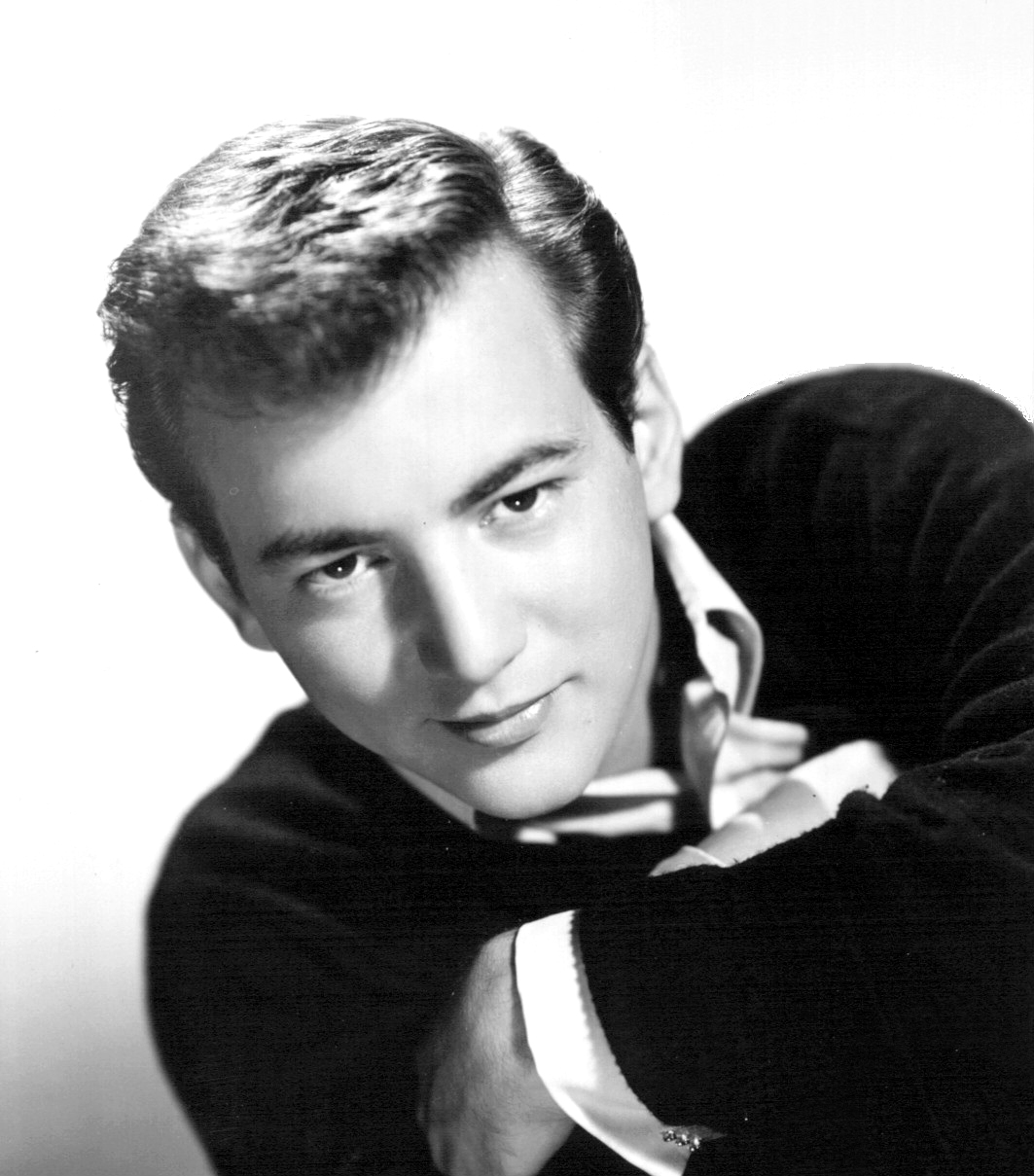
Inaugural winner Bobby Darin won in 1960. (Note: went on to score 22 top 40 hits in America, including five top three hits and a number one song.)

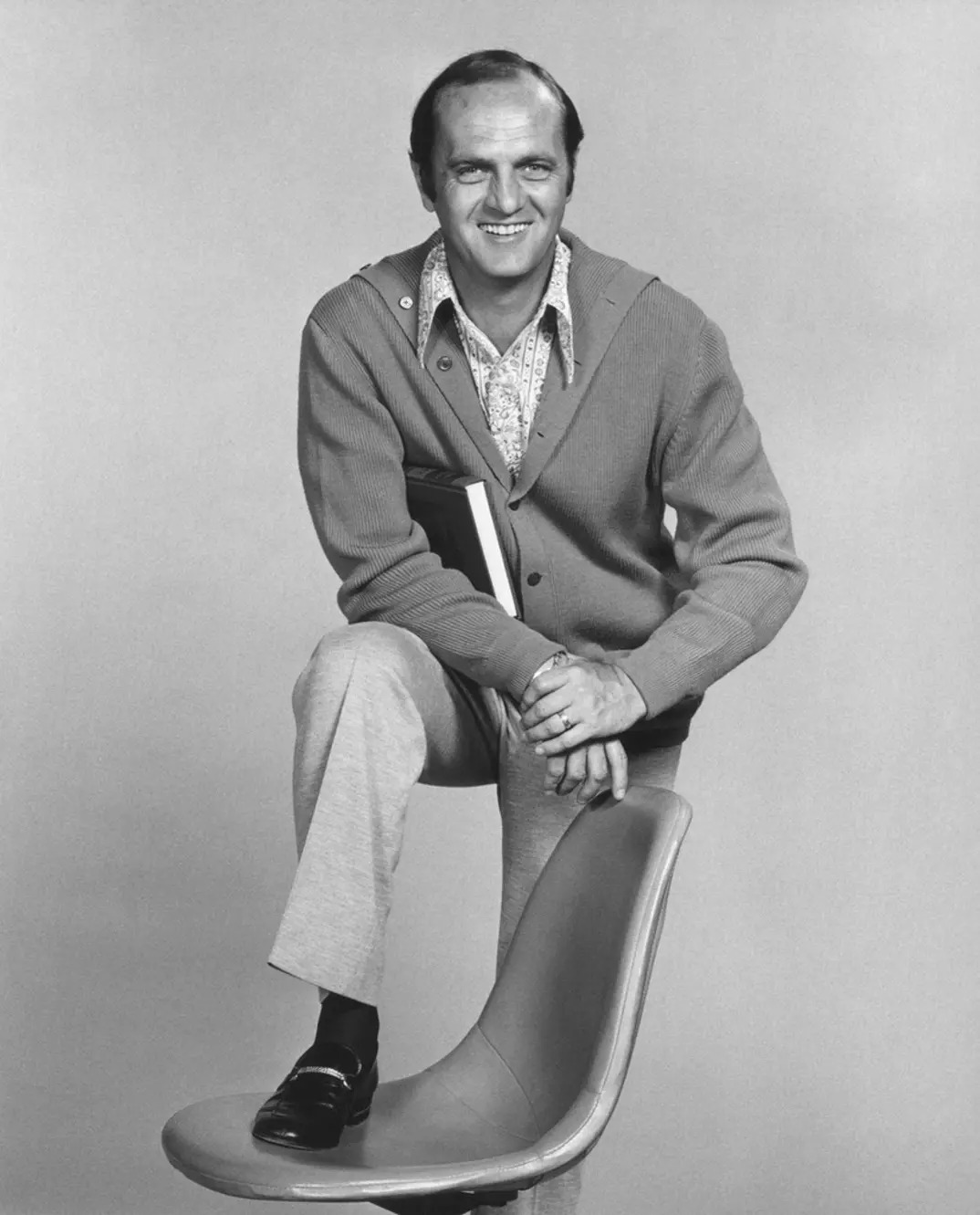
Comedian Bob Newhart won in 1961. The same year he also won the Album of the Year award. (Note: He is the only non-musician to win this award.)

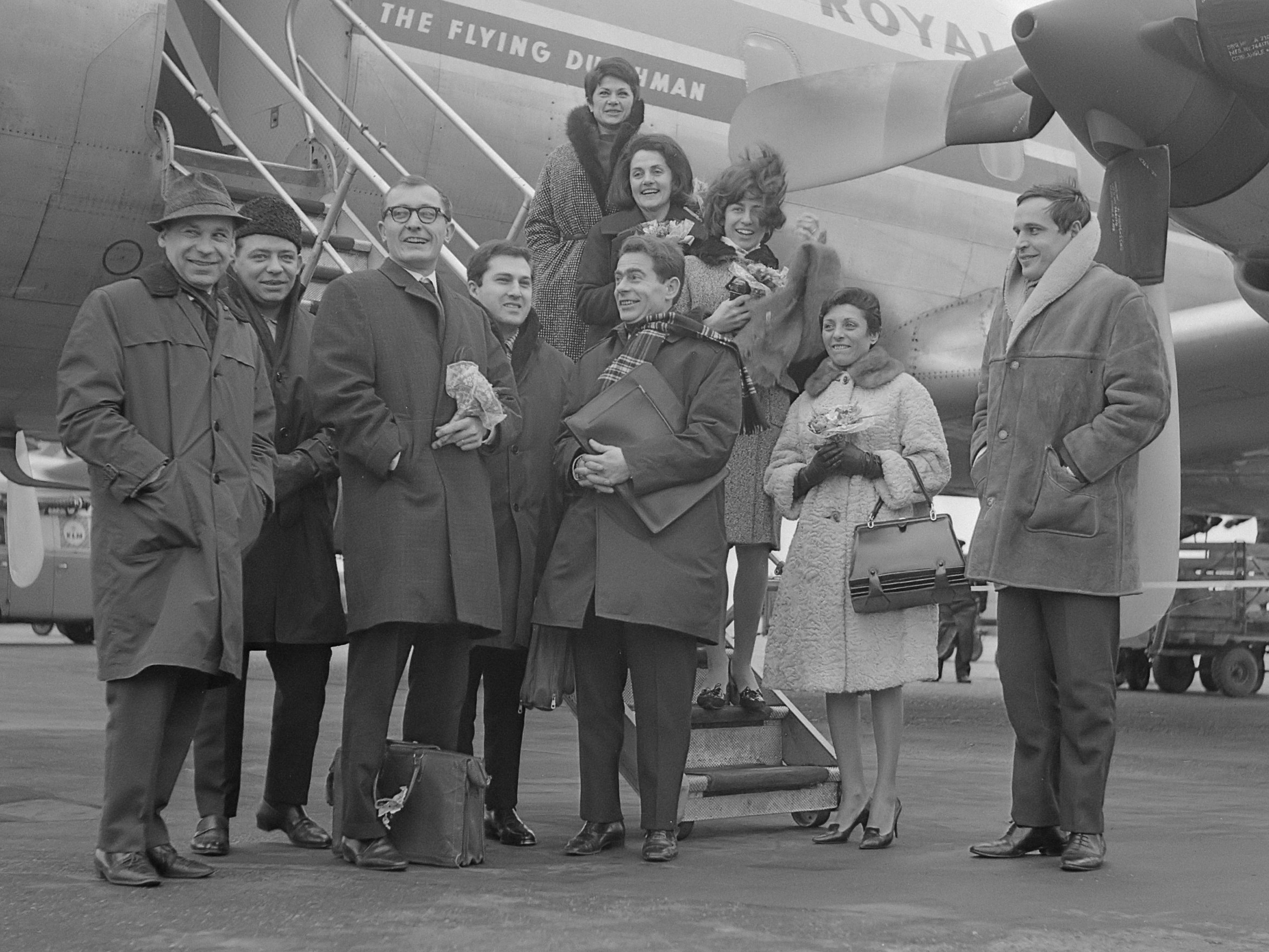
The Swingle Singers were the first group and Foreign act to win this award in 1964.

The Beatles (Members John Lennon, Paul McCartney, Ringo Starr, and George Harrison, clockwise from top left), won in 1965. (Note: They went on to become the best selling band of all time.)

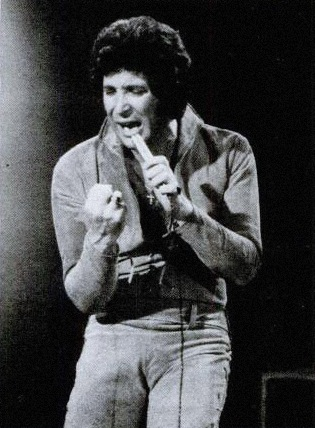
Tom Jones won in 1966.

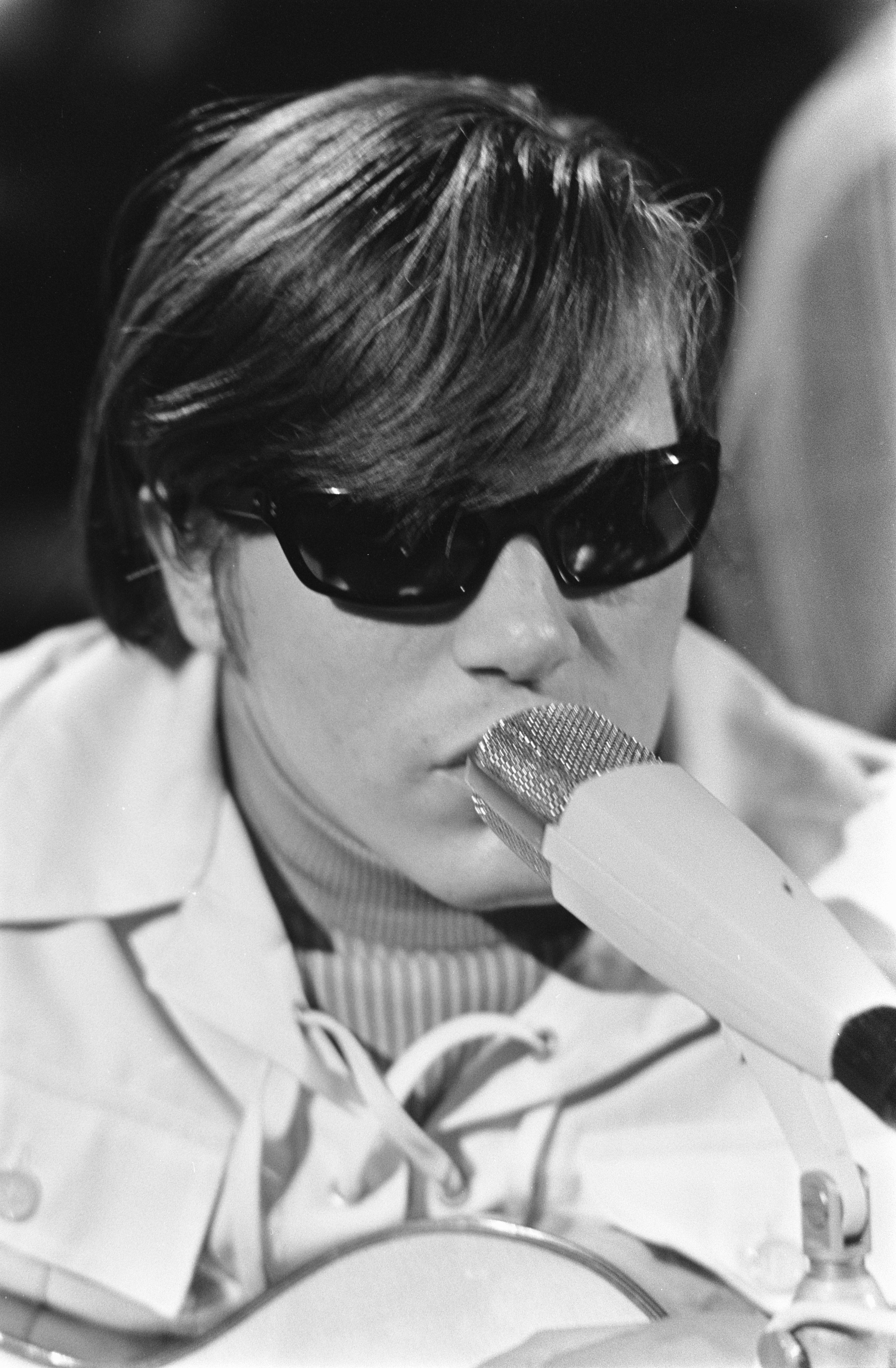
José Feliciano is the first Hispanic and only blind artist to win the award in 1969.

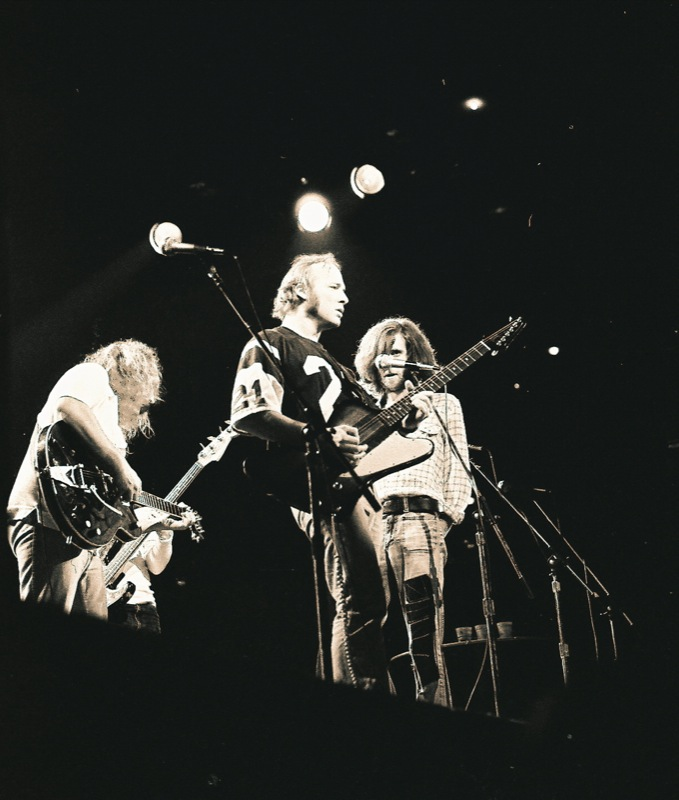
Crosby, Stills, Nash & Young won in 1970. (Note: Their music unerringly reflected the tastes and viewpoints of the counterculture when they won in 1970.)

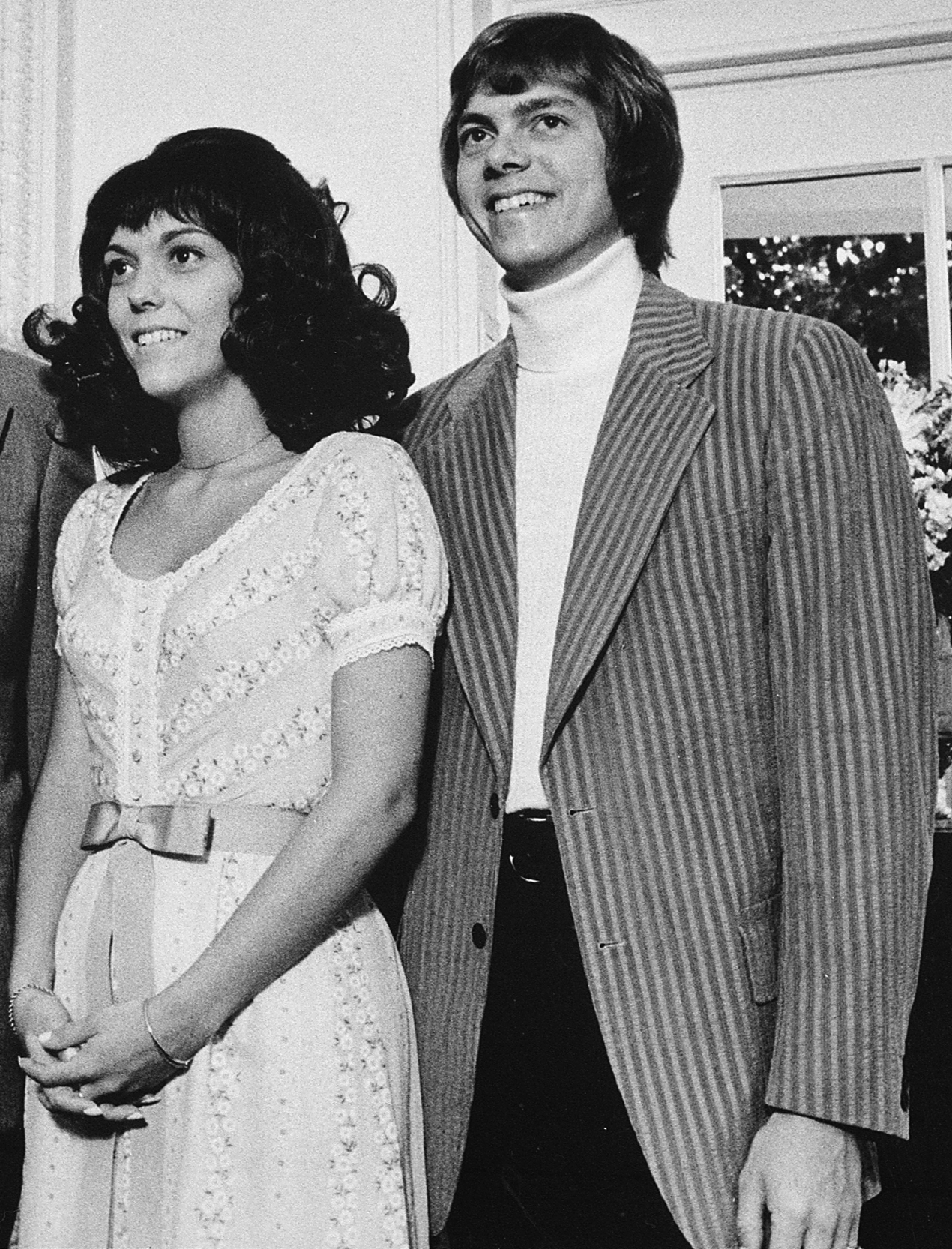
The Carpenters members Karen Carpenter and Richard Carpenter became the first duo to win the award in 1971.

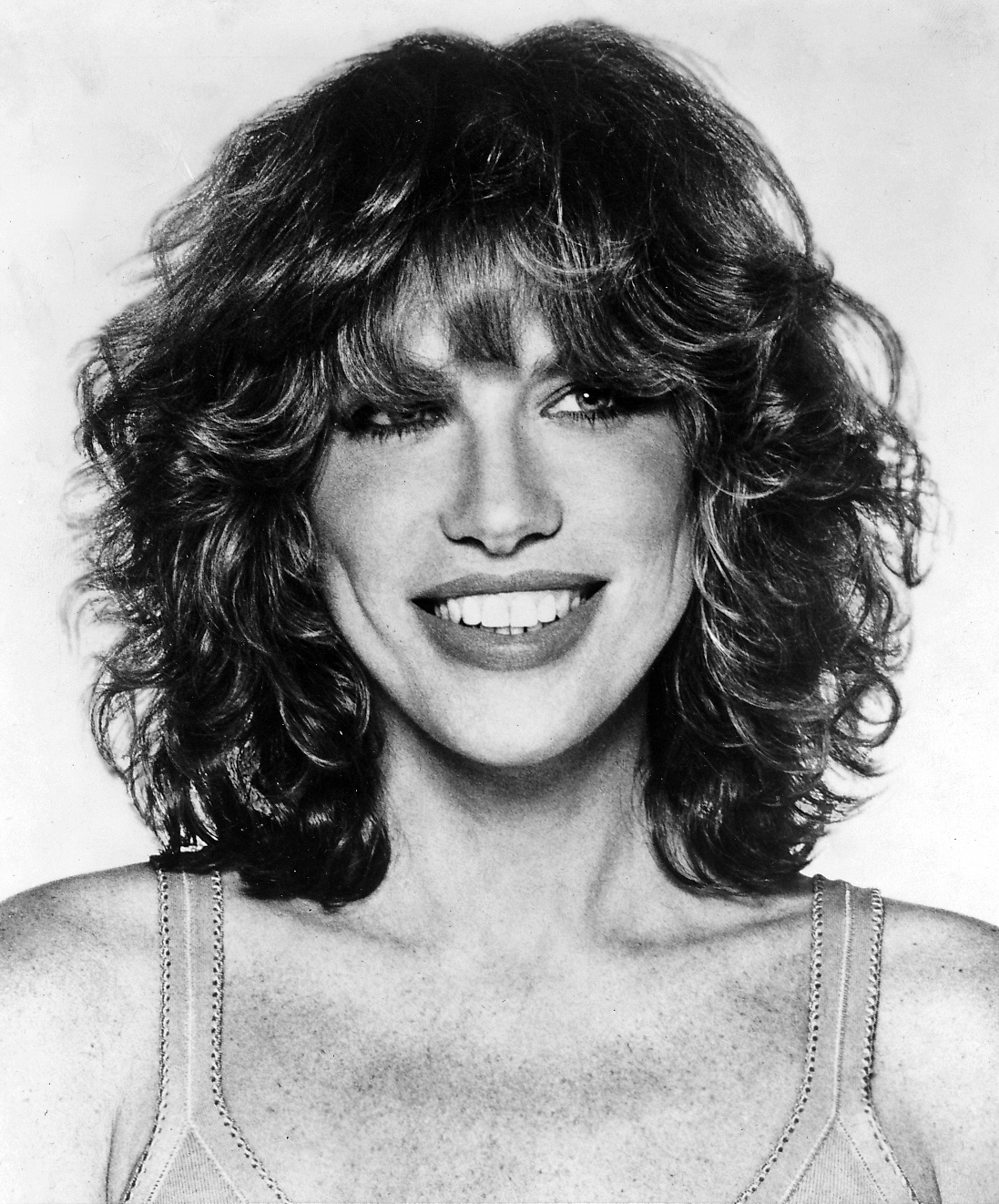
Carly Simon won in 1972.

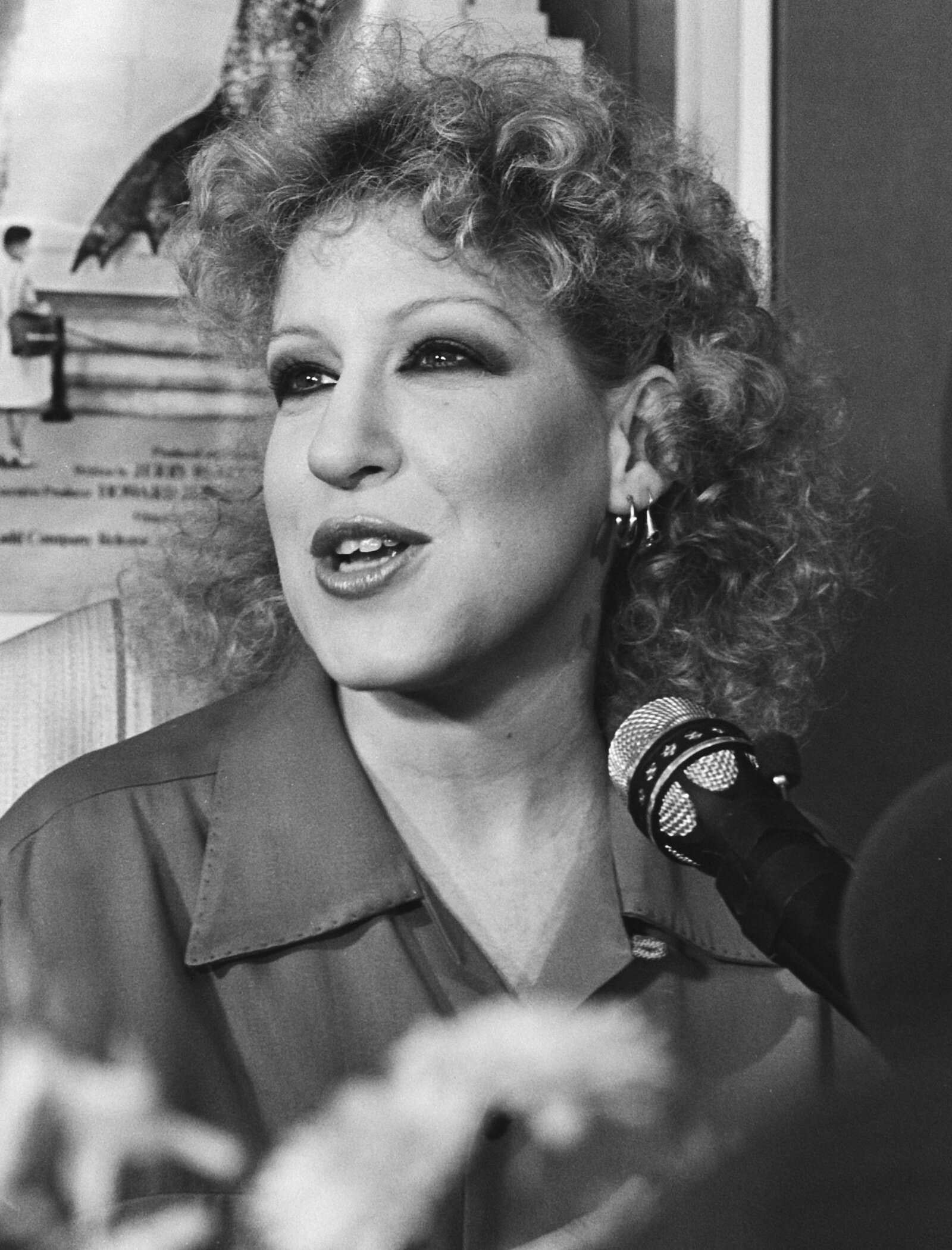
Bette Midler won in 1974.

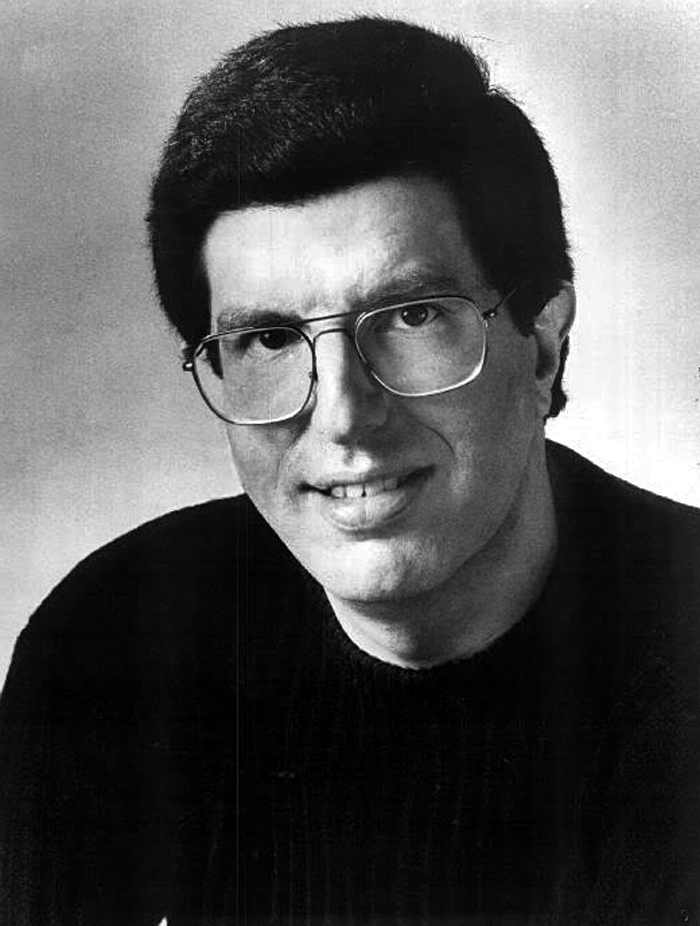
Composer Marvin Hamlisch won in 1975.

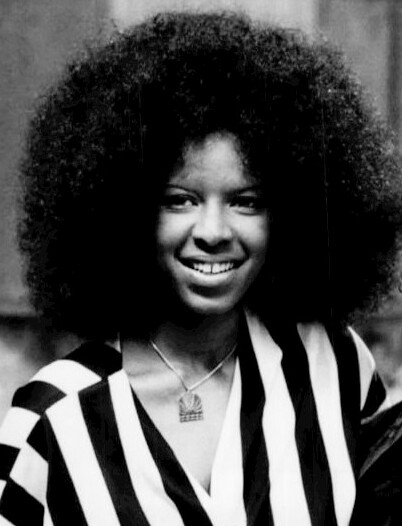
Natalie Cole became the first African-American to win the award in 1976.

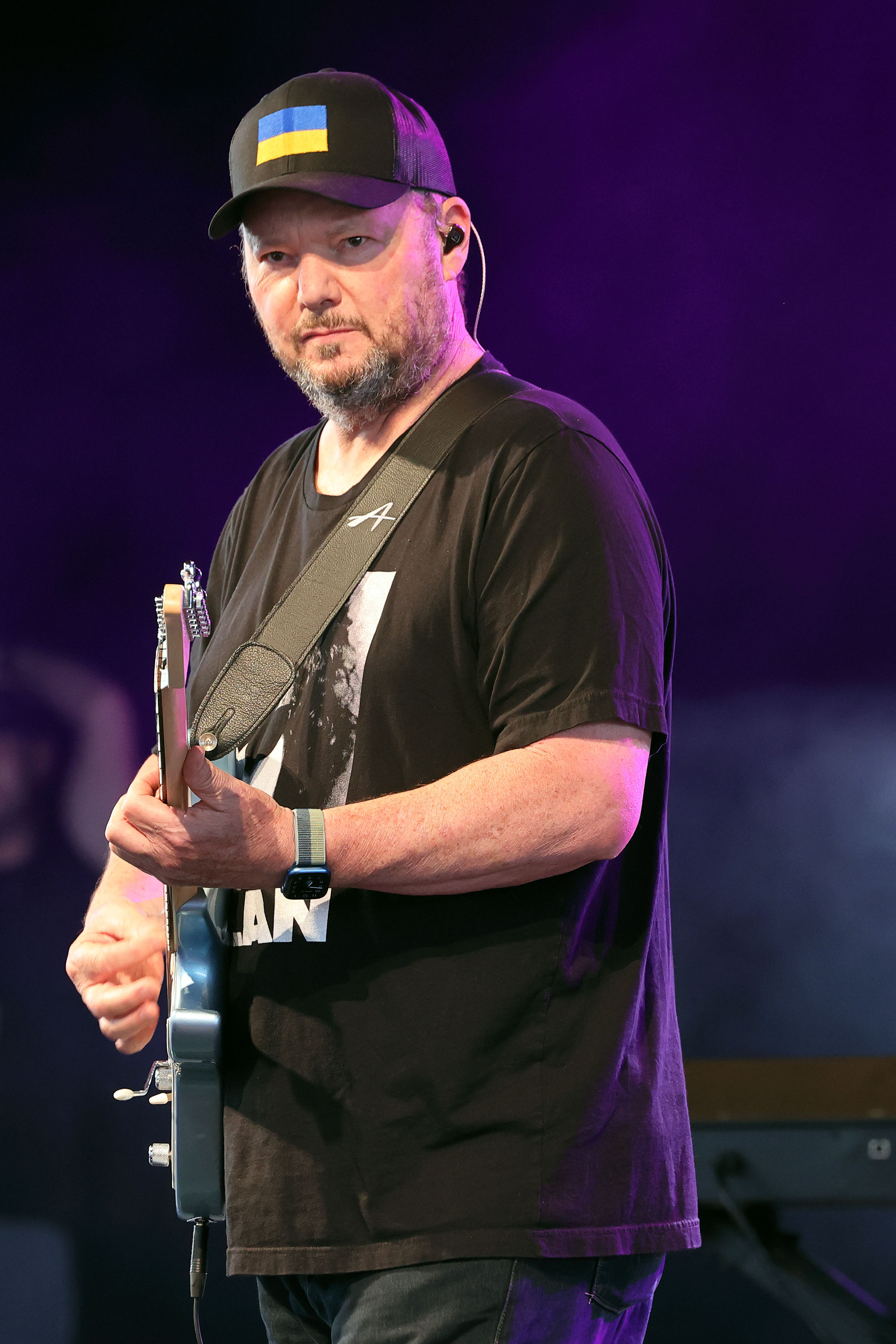
Christopher Cross won in 1981. (Note: He is the first "Best New Artist" winner to win this award as well as Album of the Year, Record of the Year, and Song of the Year all in one night.)

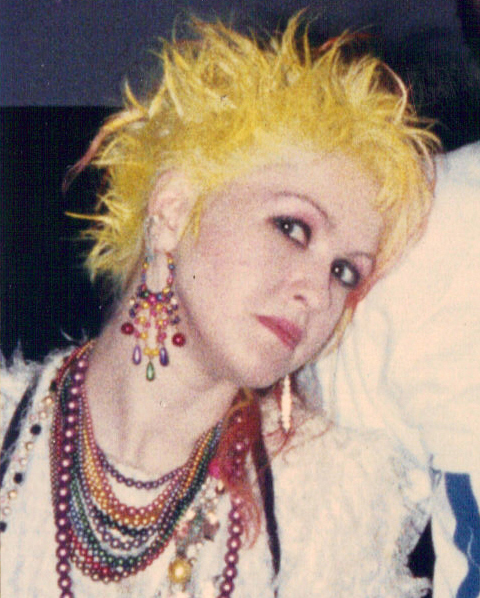
Cyndi Lauper won in 1985.

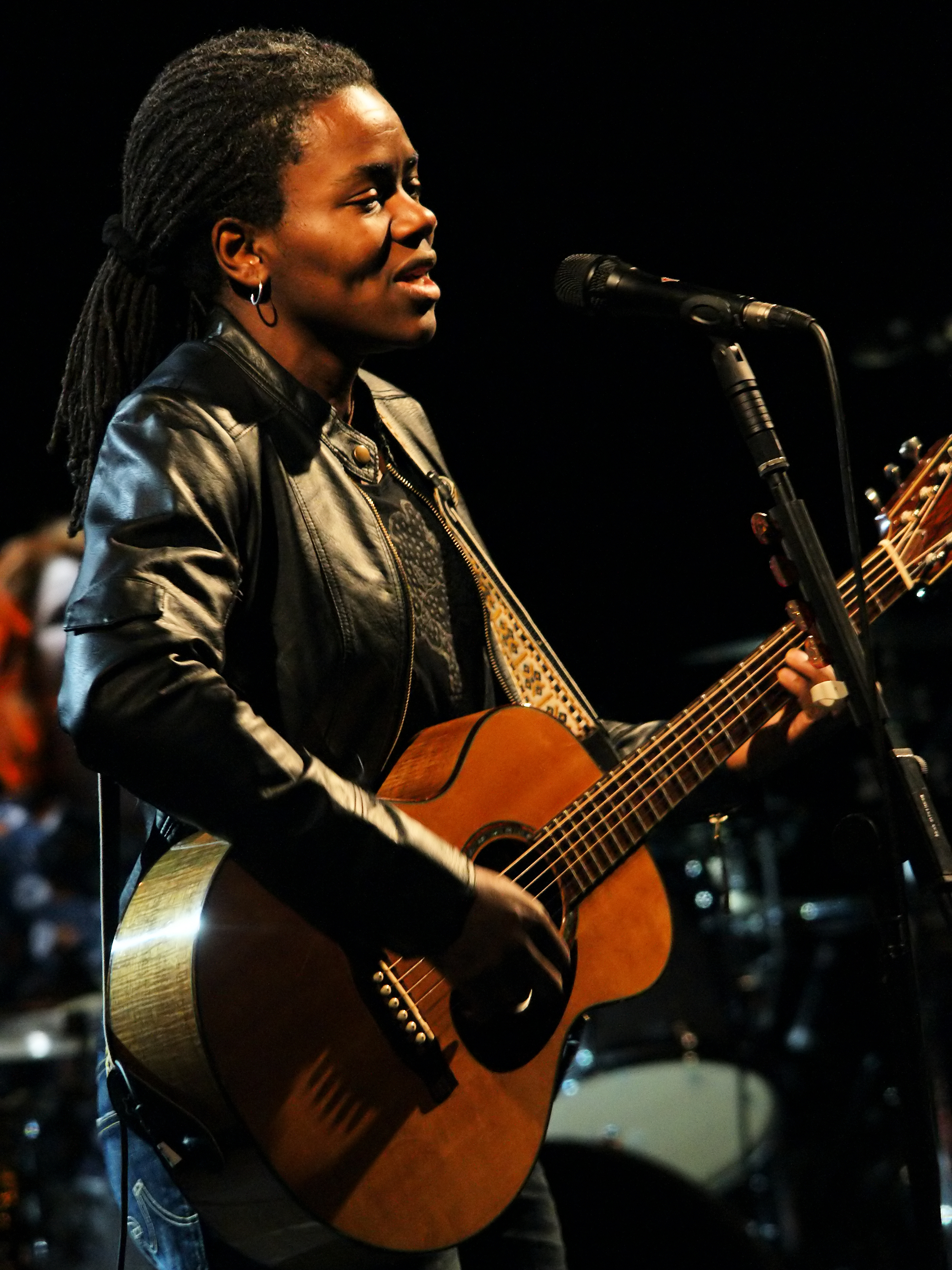
Tracy Chapman won in 1989.

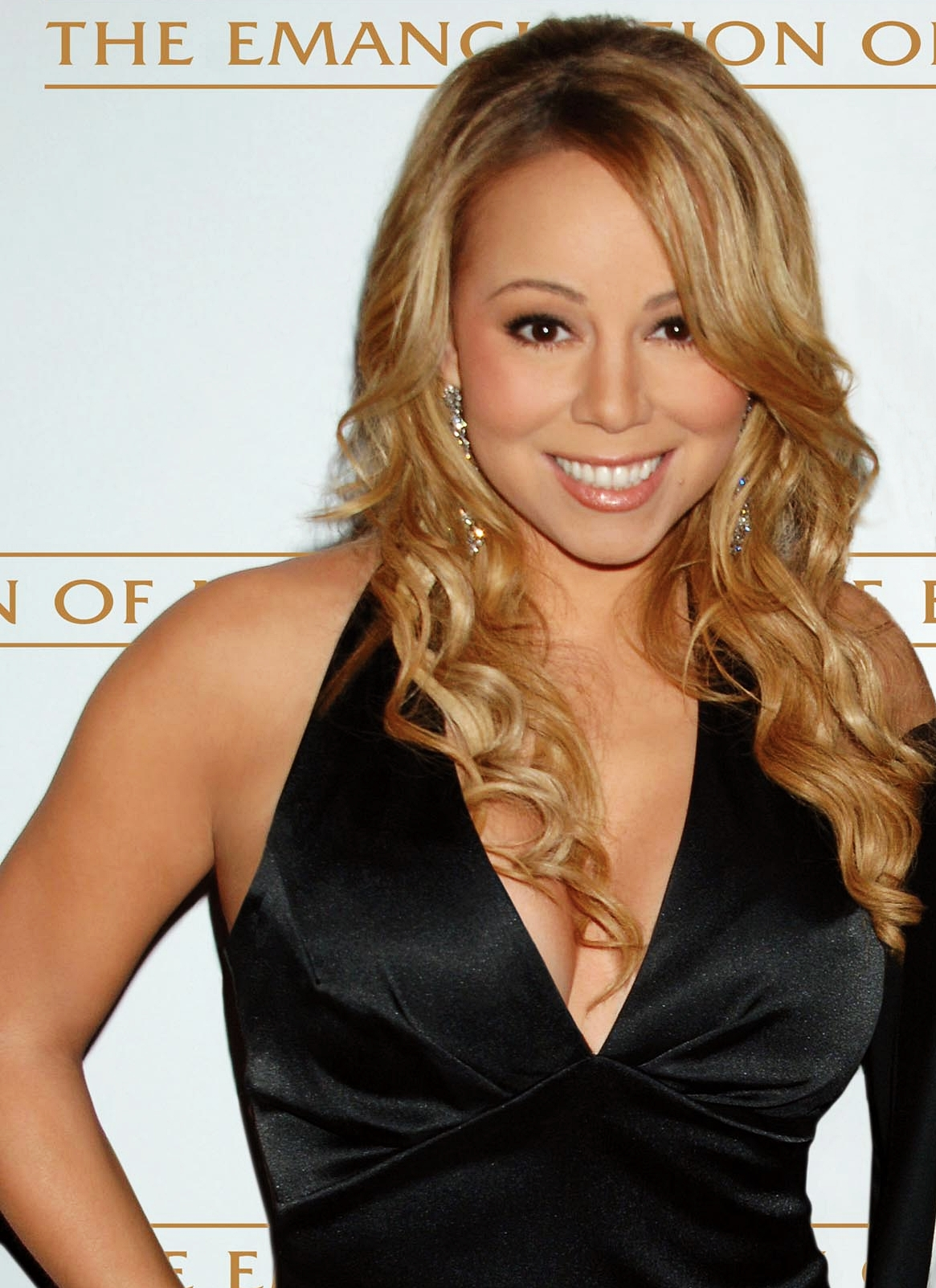
Mariah Carey won in 1991.

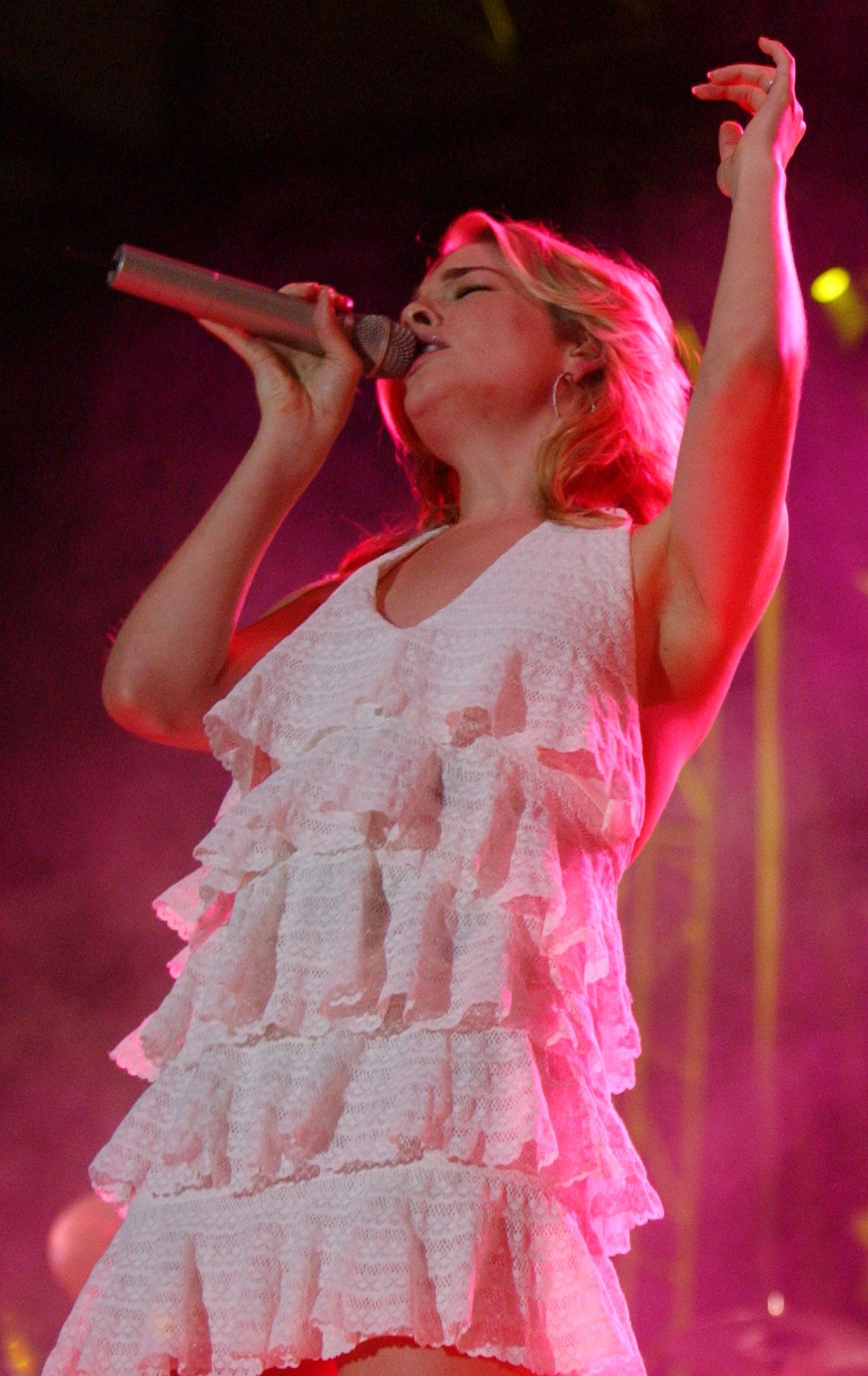
At the age of 14, LeAnn Rimes won in 1997, becoming the youngest artist to win this award.

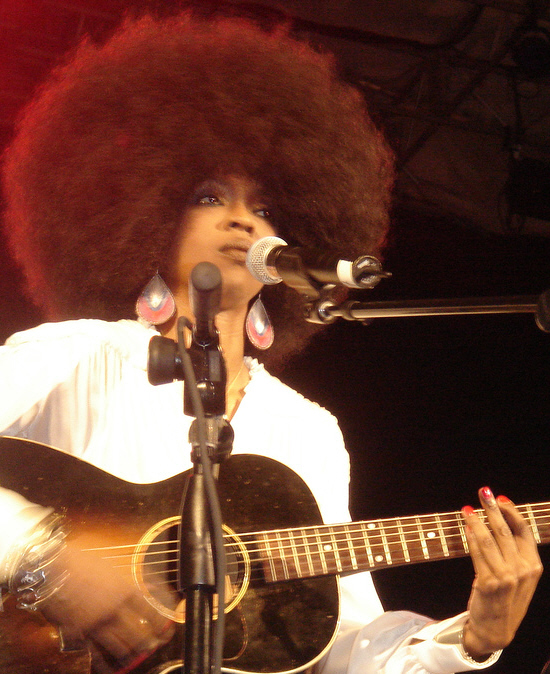
Lauryn Hill in 1999.

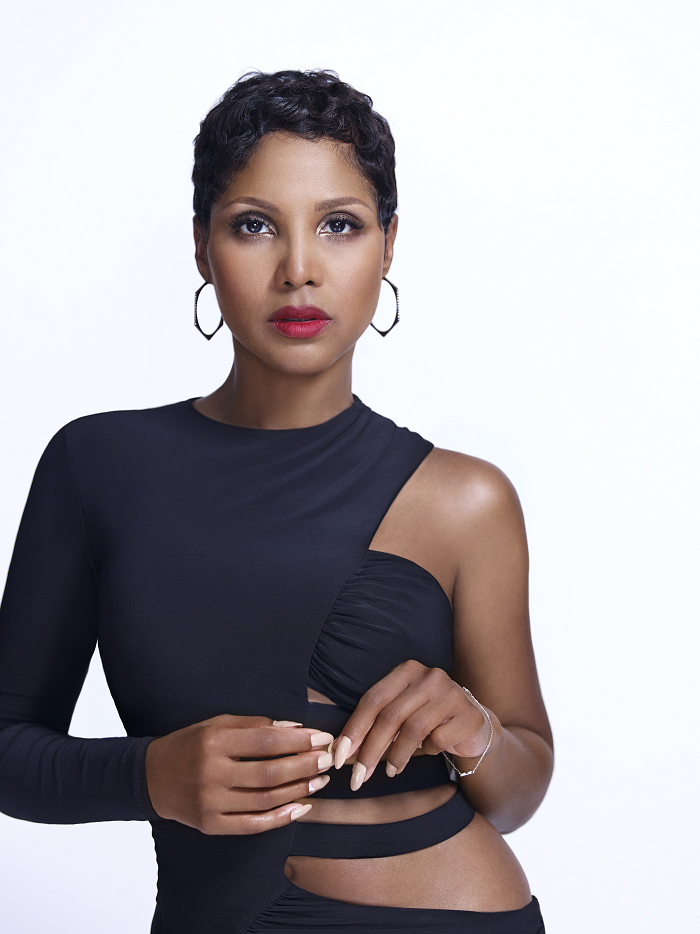
Toni Braxton won in 1994.

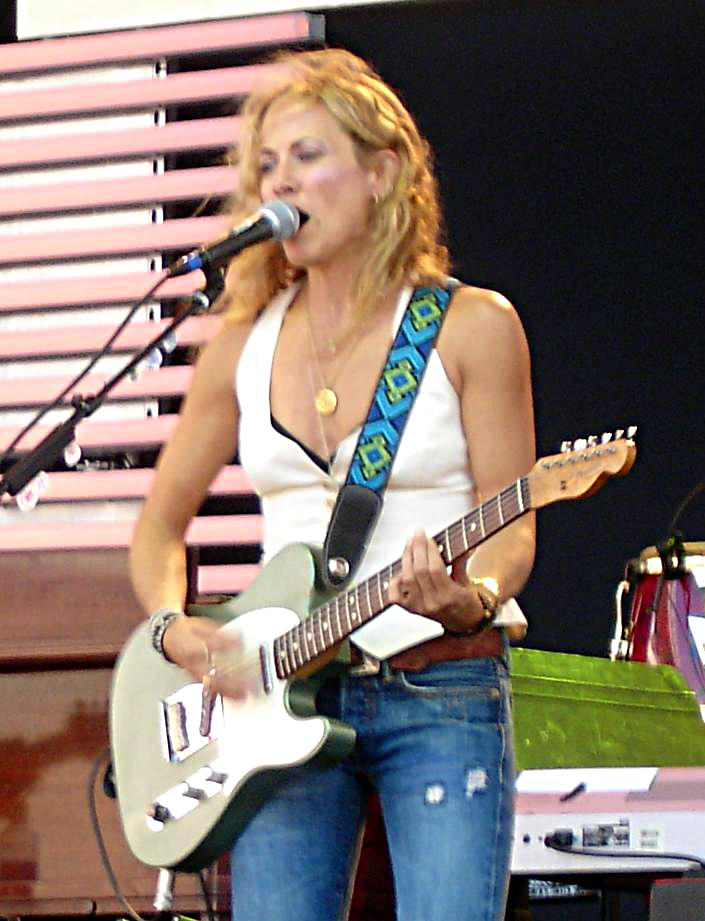
Sheryl Crow won in 1995. (Note: She won two other awards at the same ceremony, including Record of the Year.)

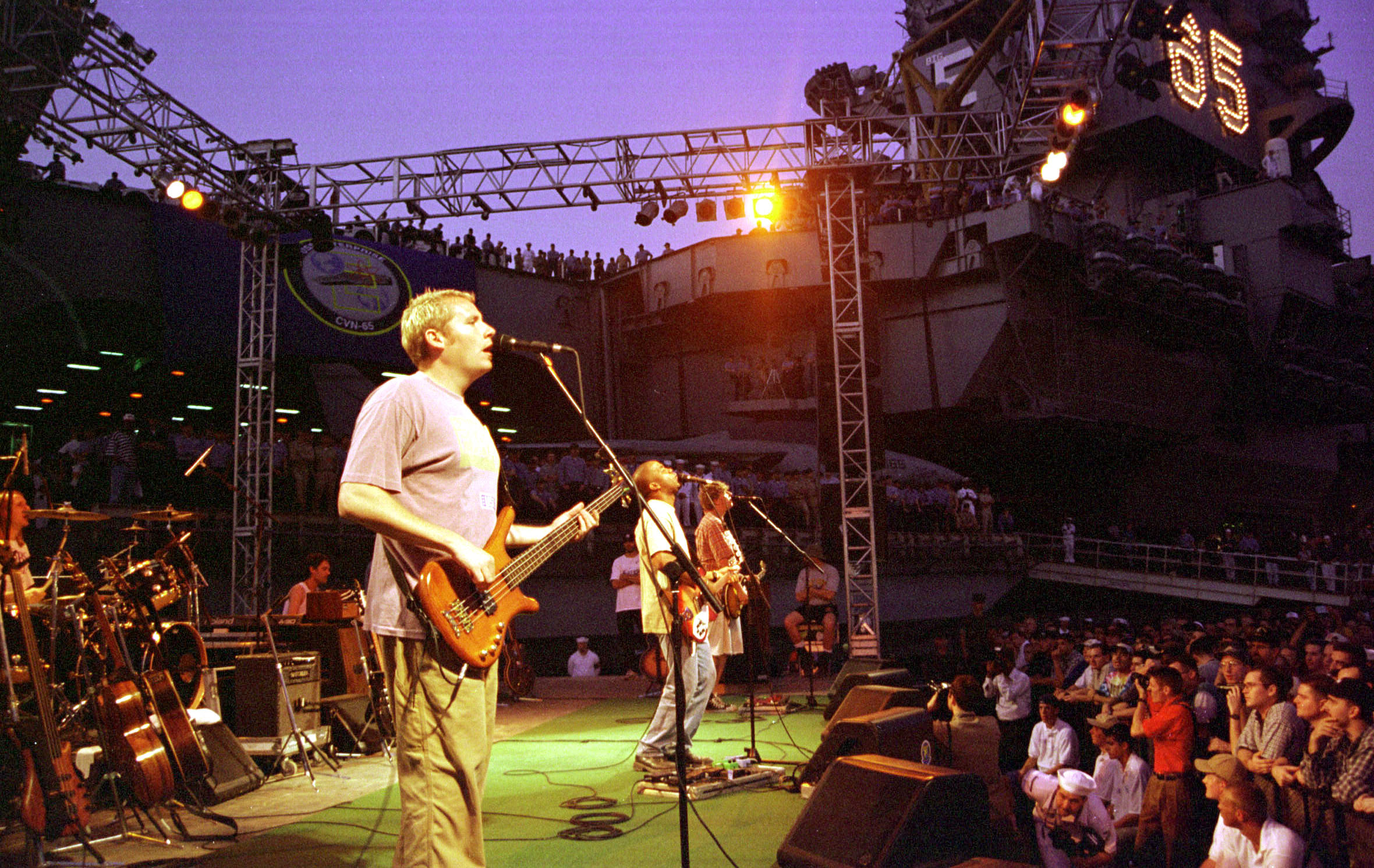
Hootie and the Blowfish won in 1996.

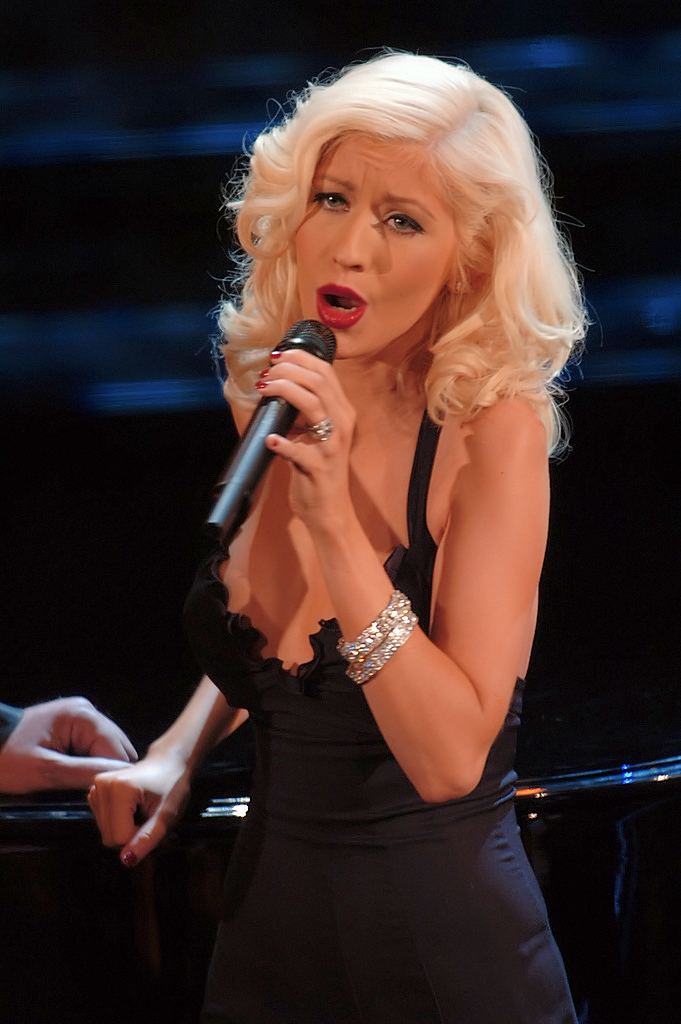
Christina Aguilera won in 2000.

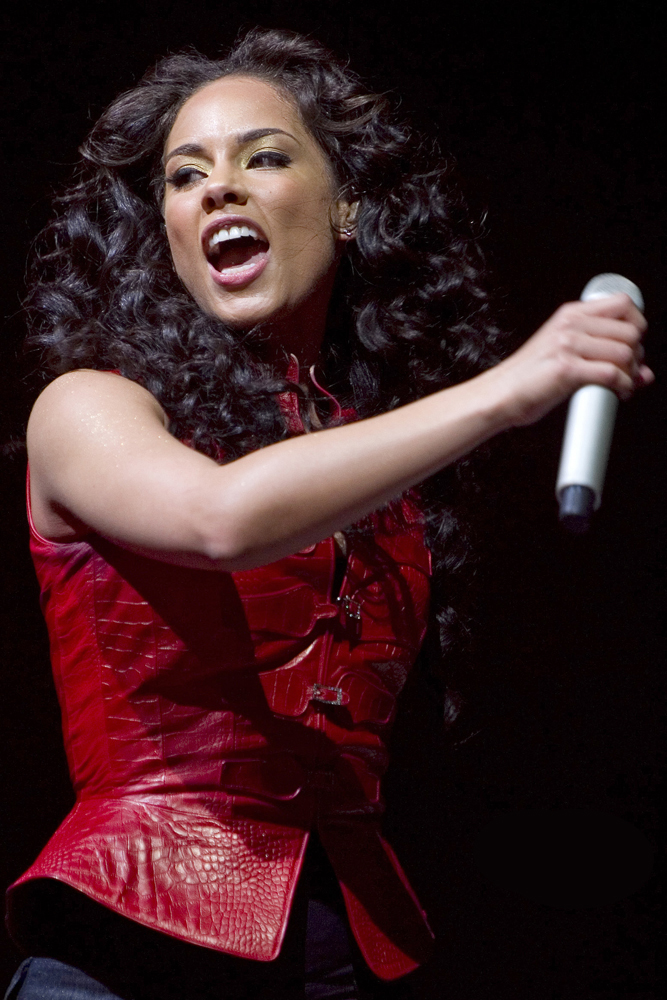
Alicia Keys won in 2002.

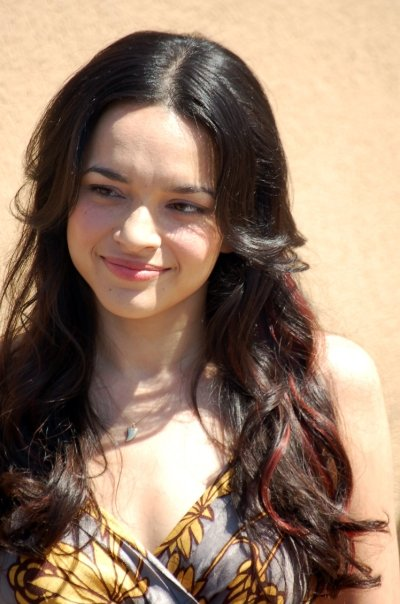
Norah Jones won in 2003.

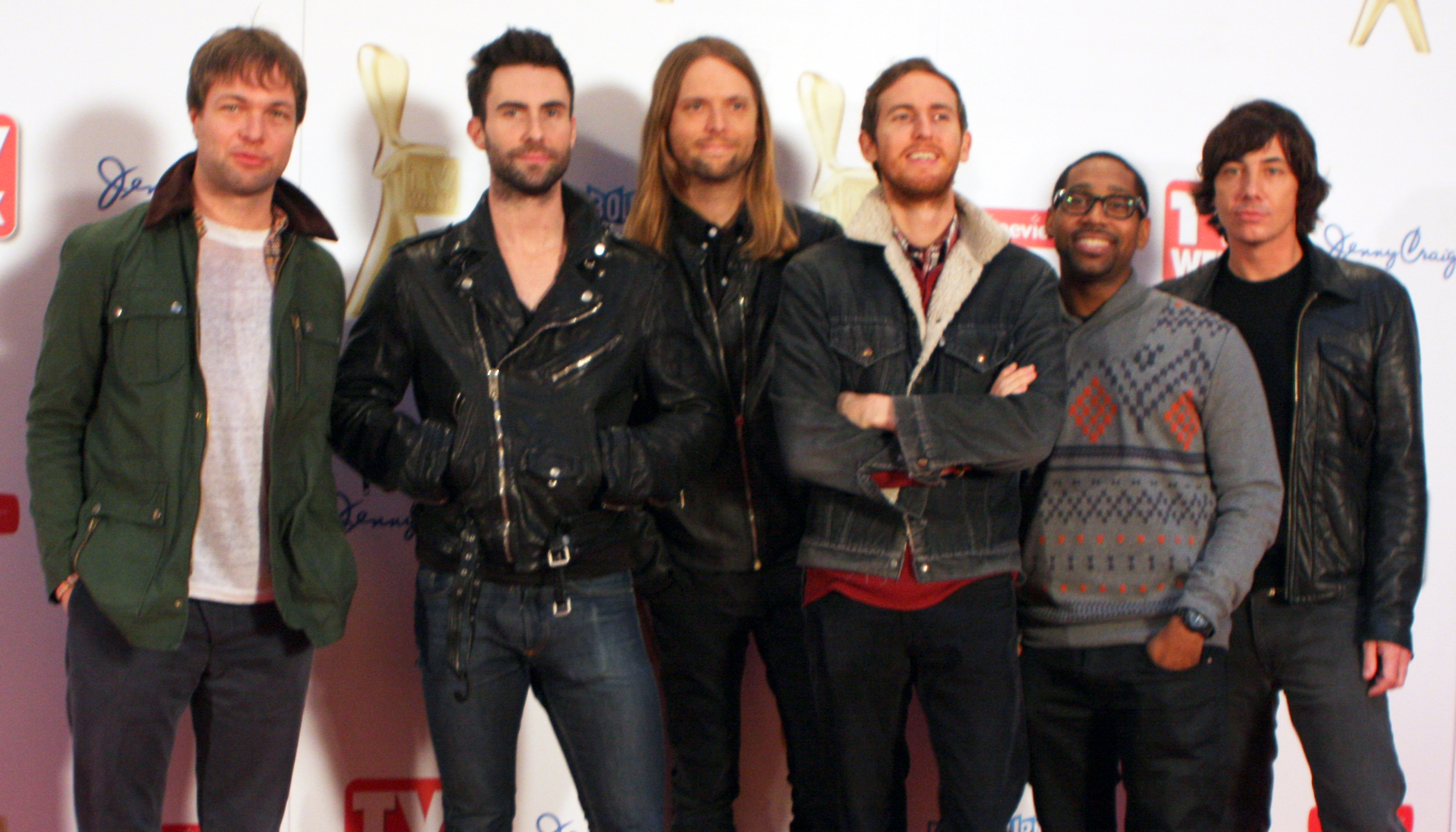
Maroon 5 won in 2005.

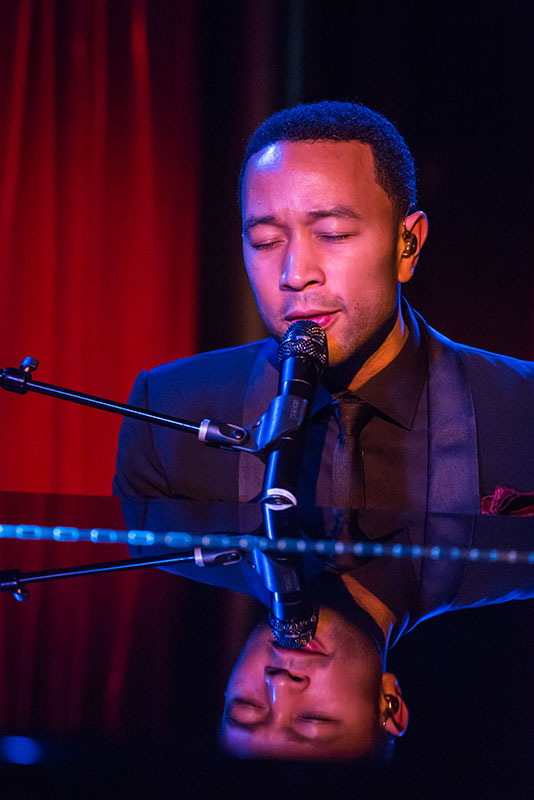
John Legend won in 2006.

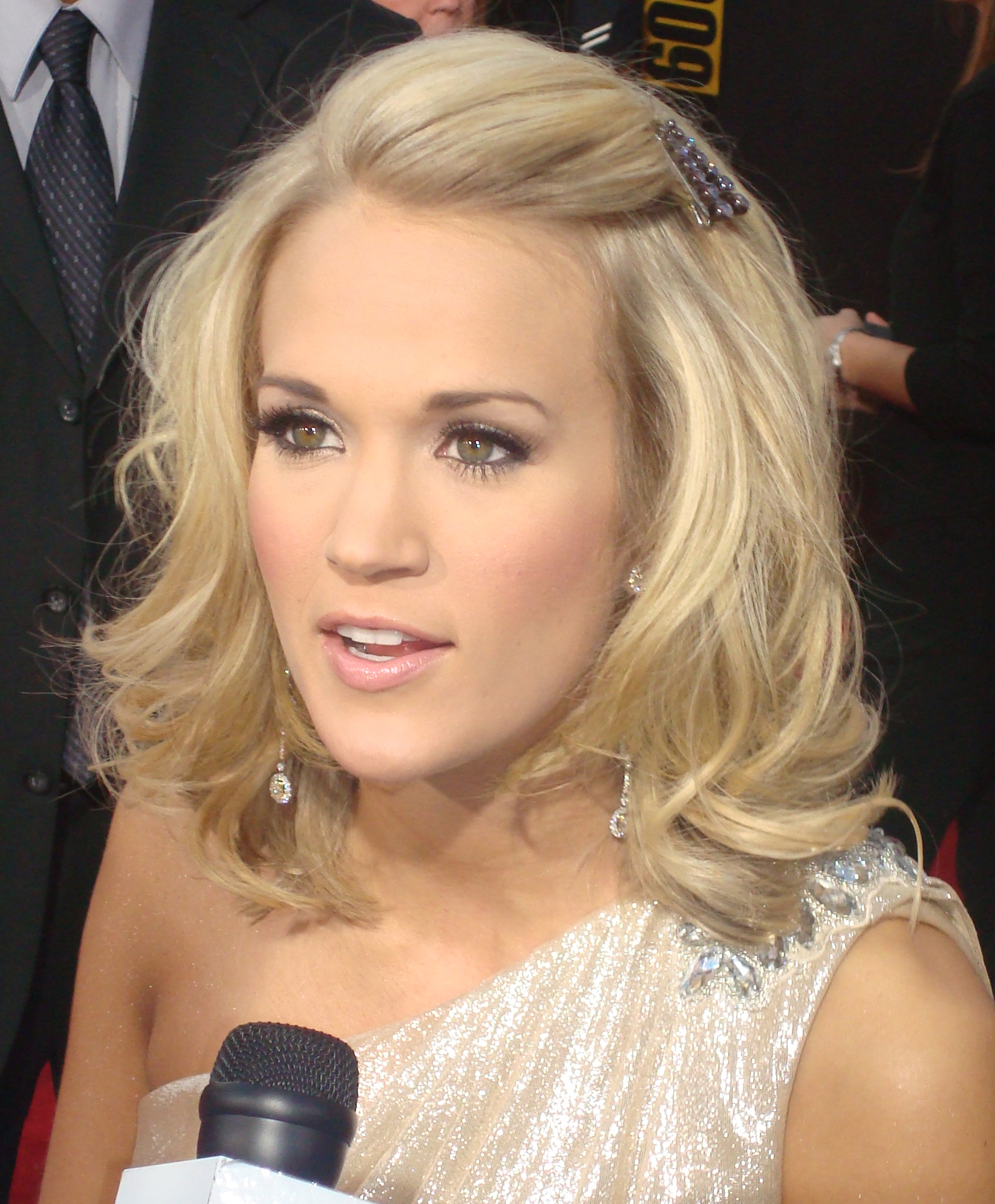
Carrie Underwood won in 2007.

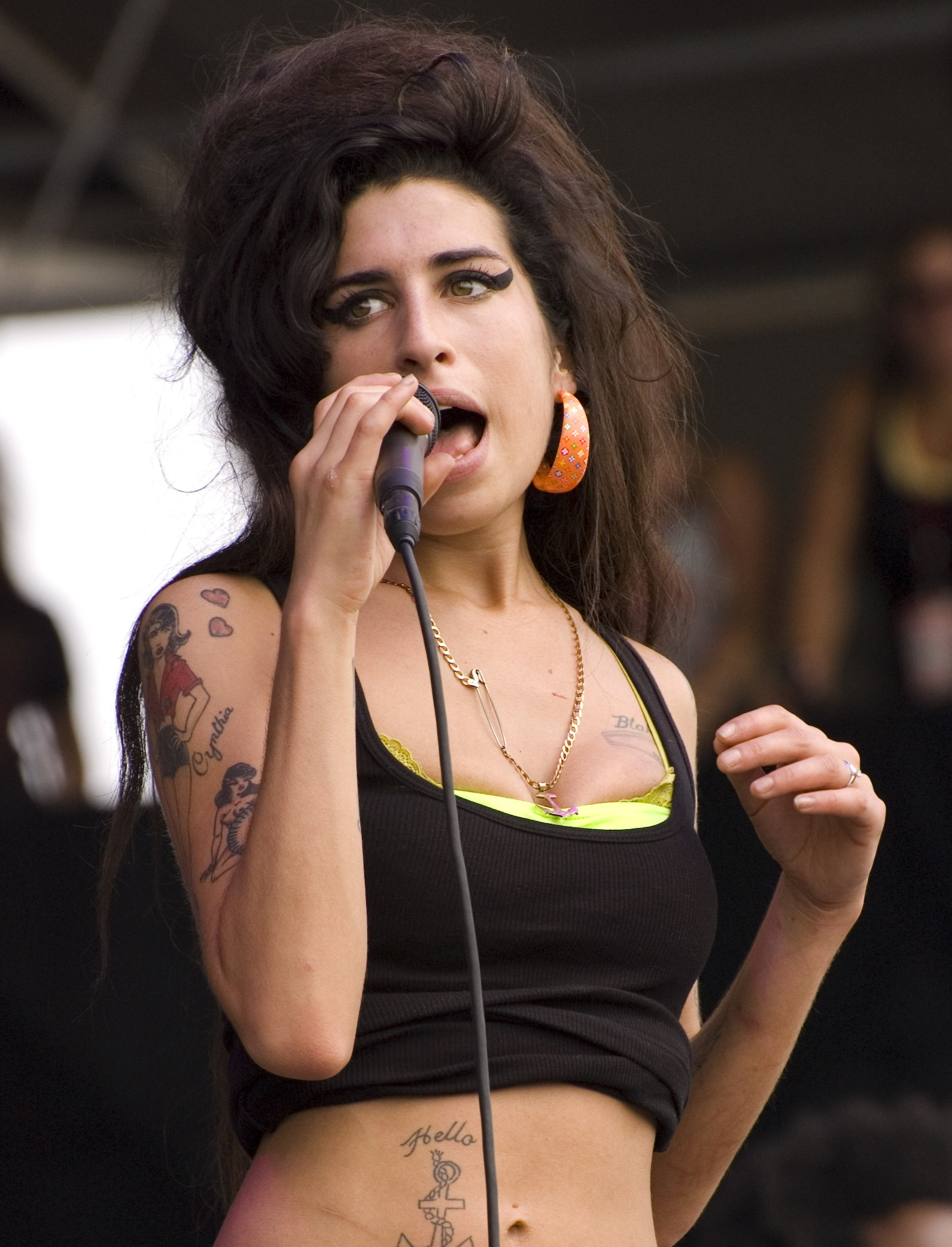
Amy Winehouse won in 2008.

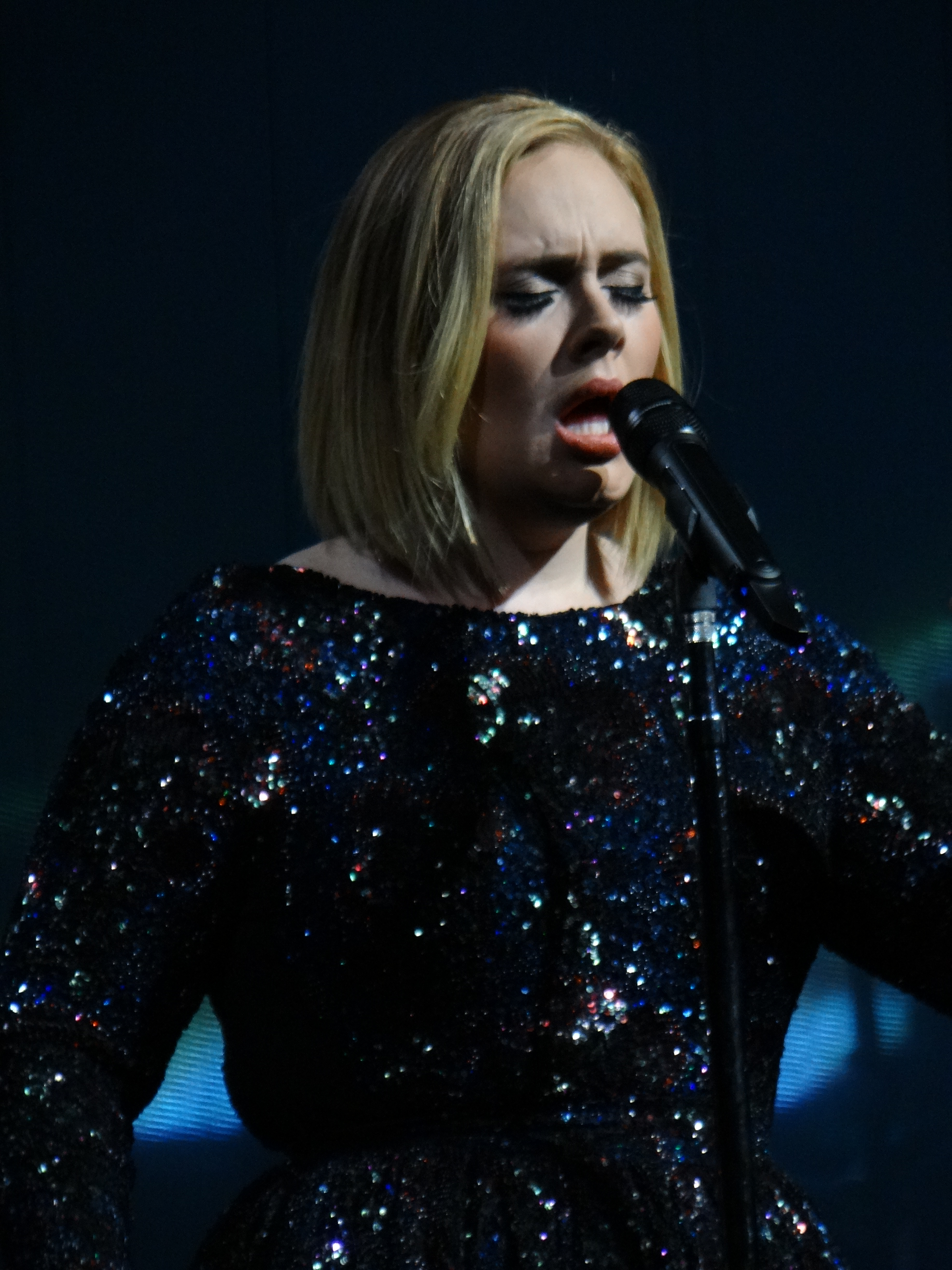
Adele won in 2009.

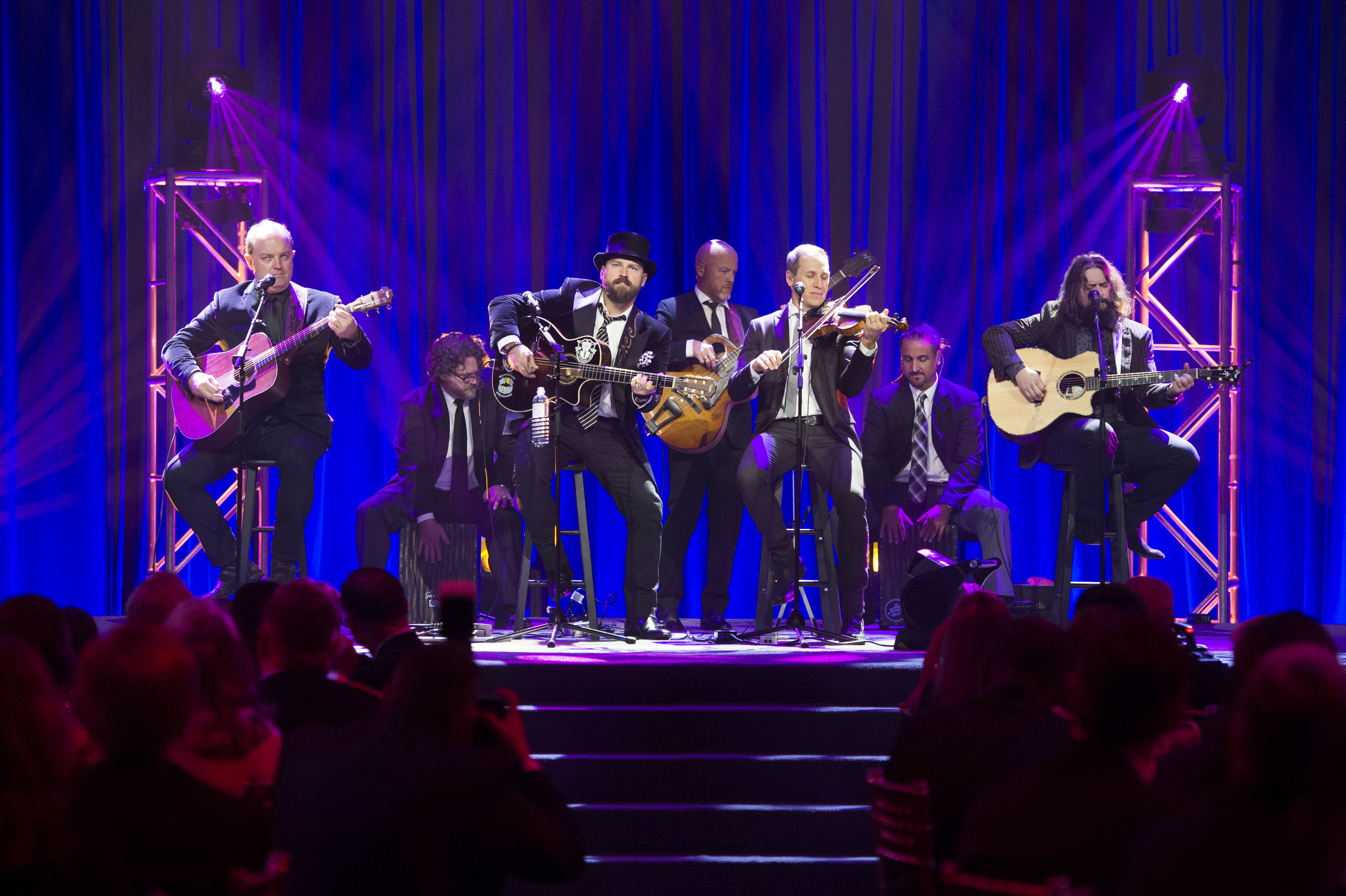
Zac Brown Band won in 2010.

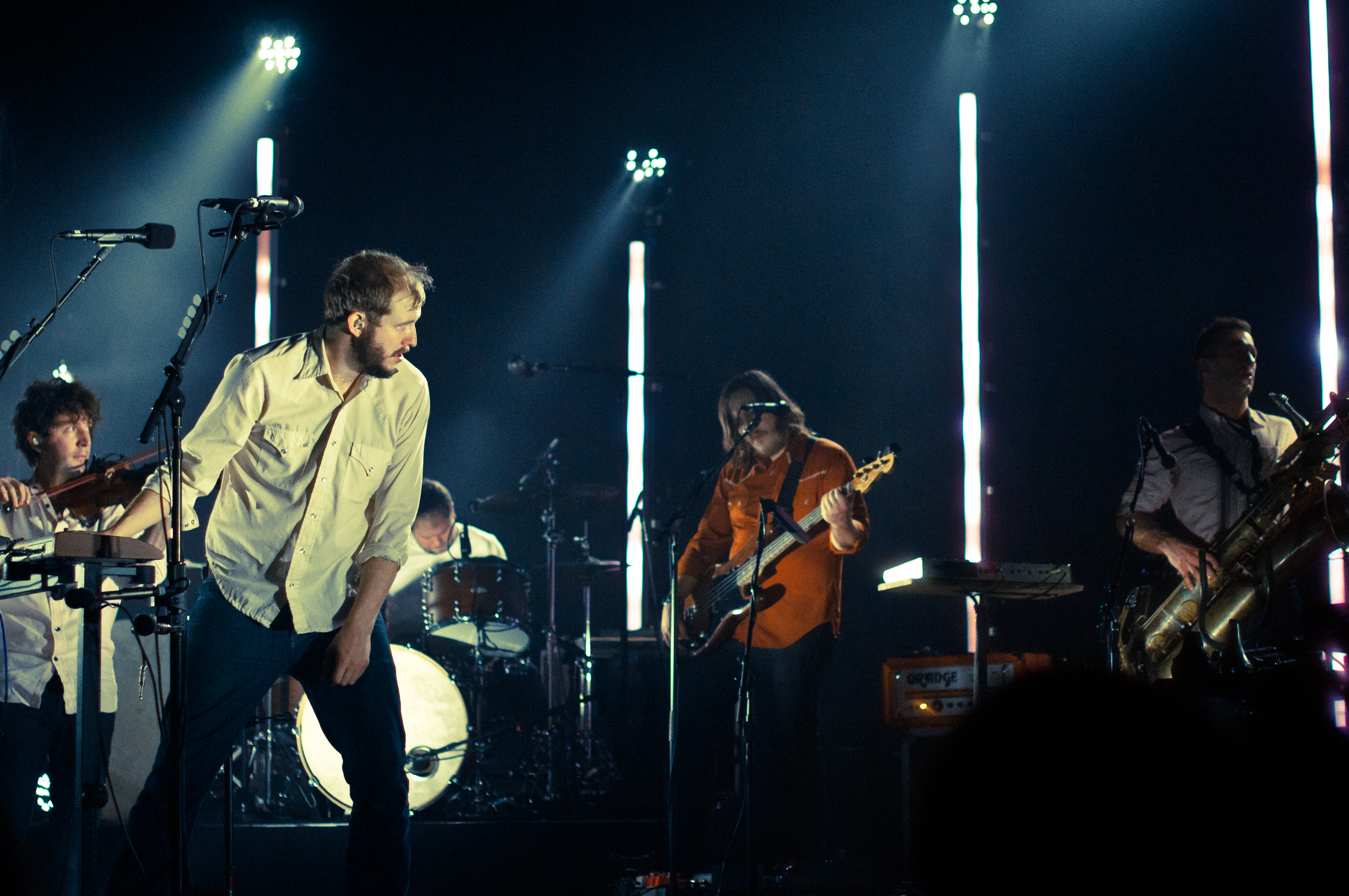
Bon Iver won in 2012.

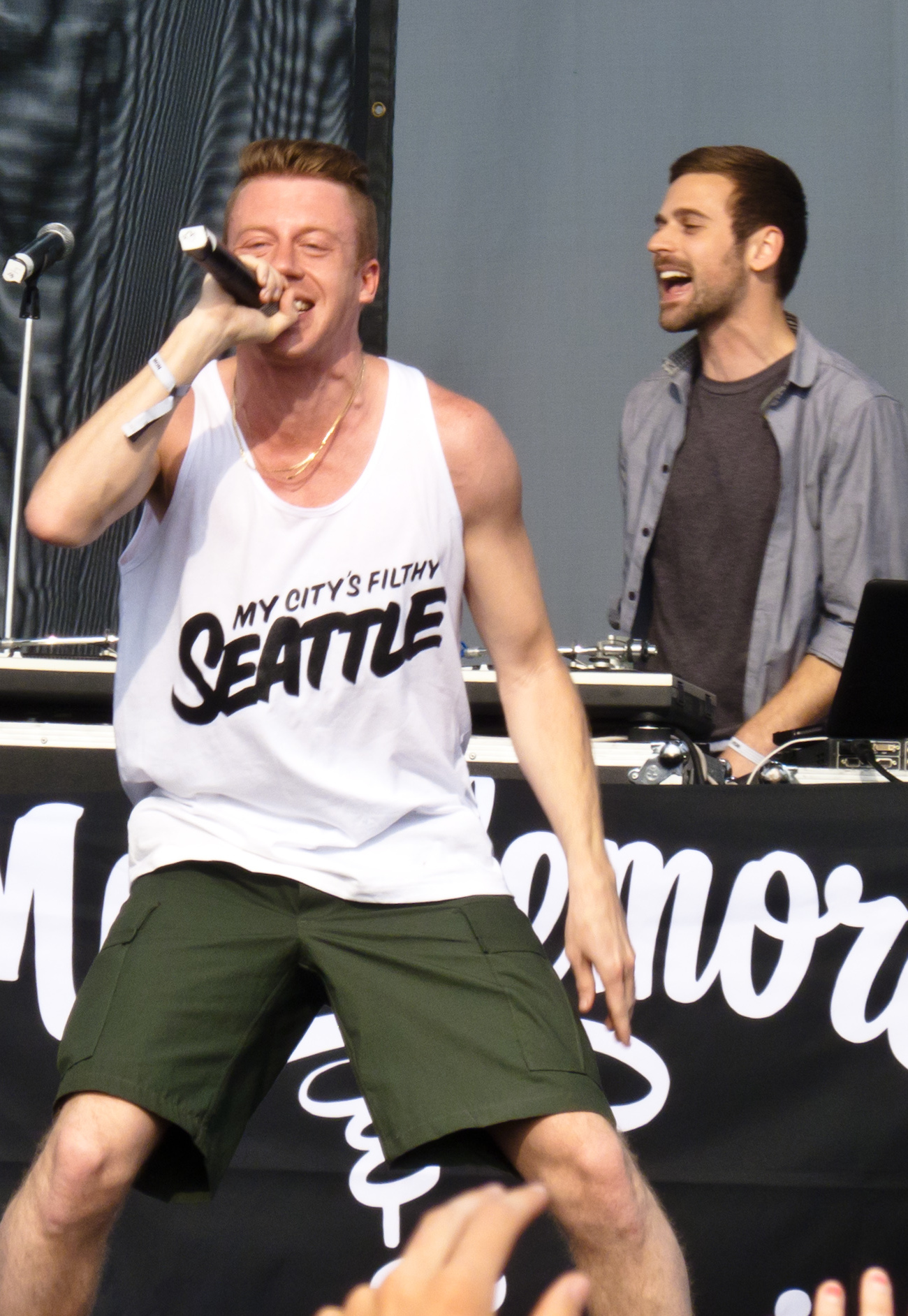
Macklemore and Ryan Lewis won in 2014.

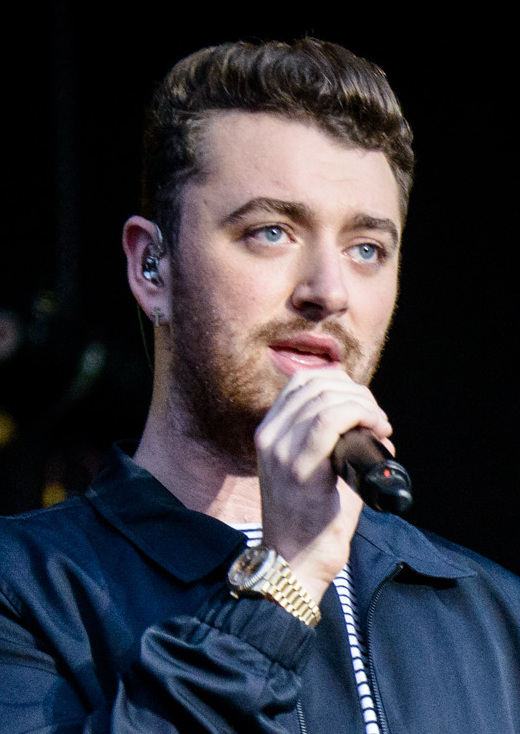
Sam Smith won in 2015.

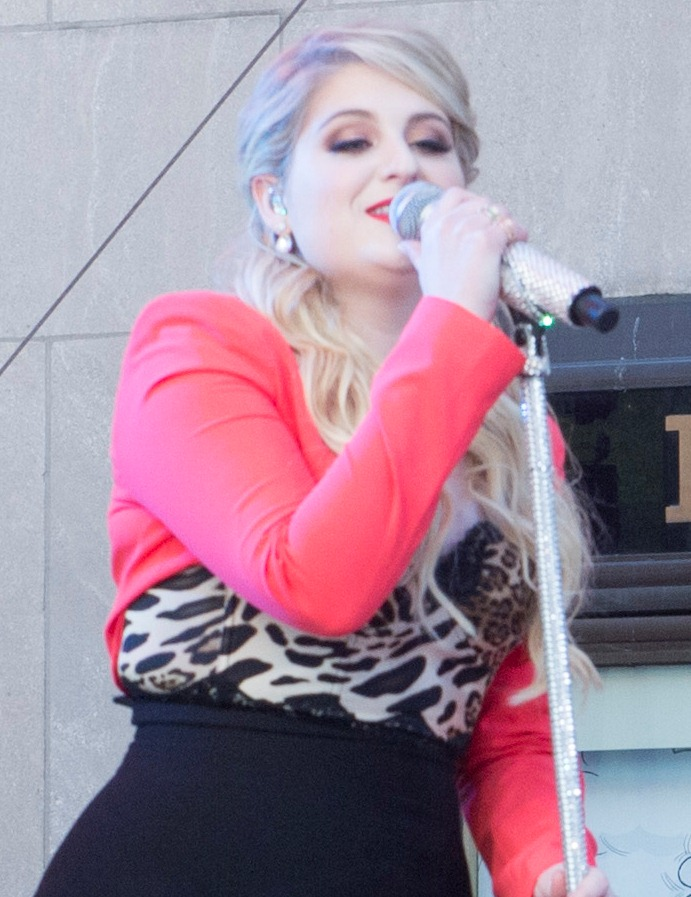
Meghan Trainor won in 2016.

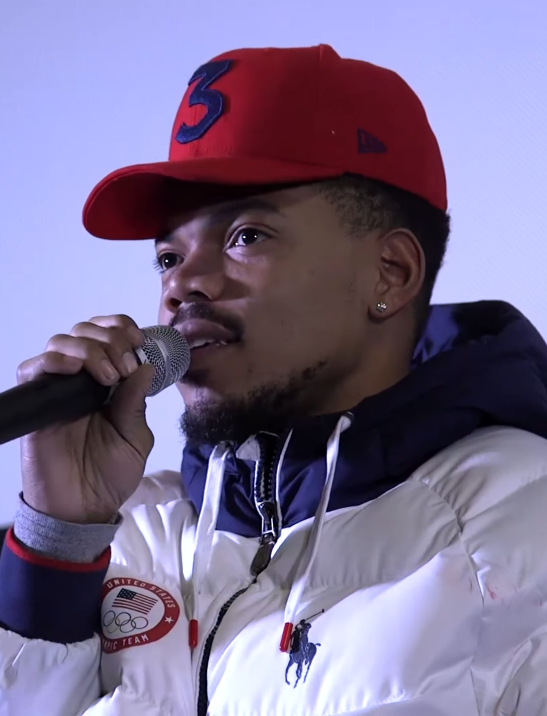
Chance the Rapper won in 2017.

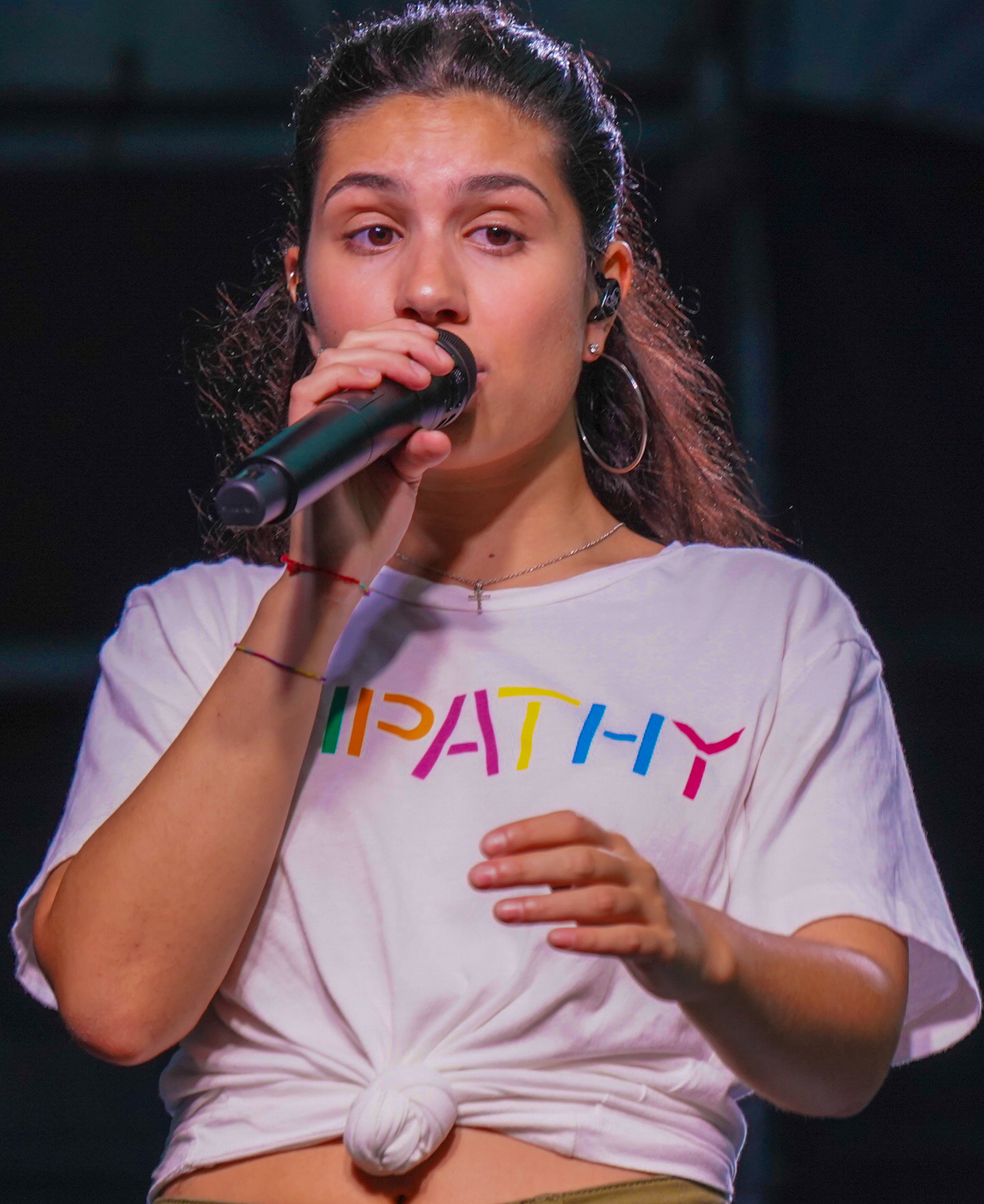
Alessia Cara won in 2018.

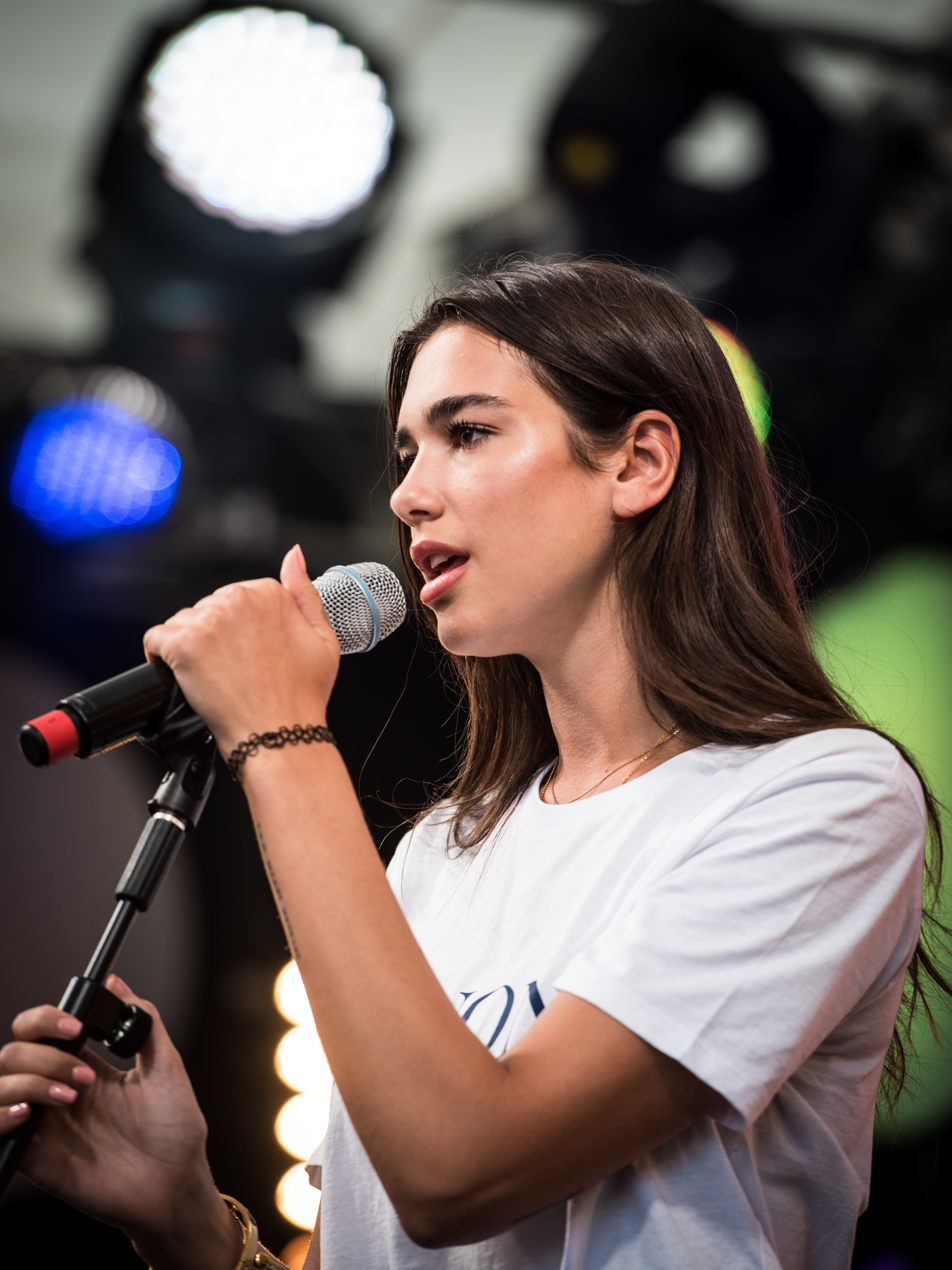
Dua Lipa won in 2019.

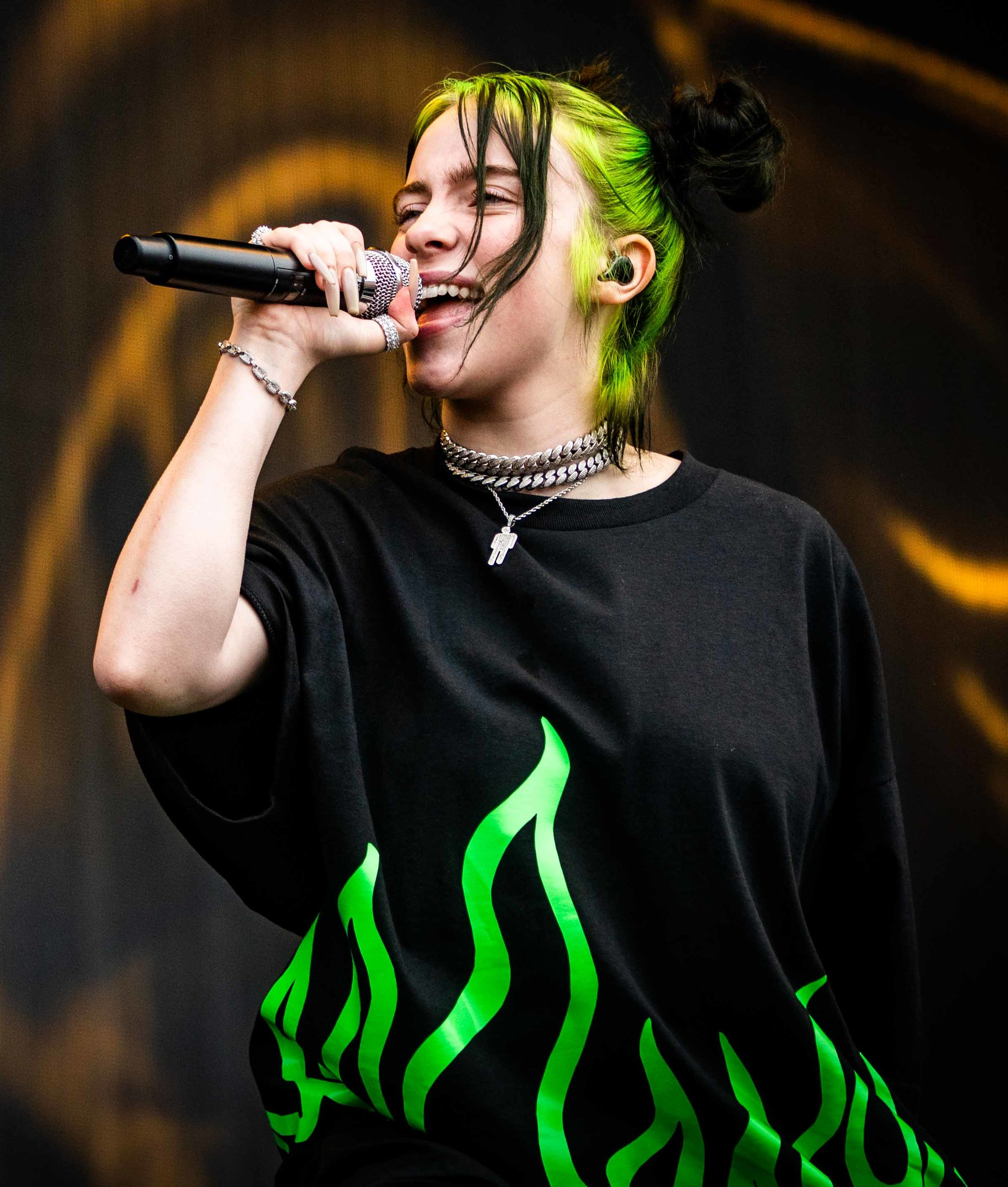
Billie Eilish won in 2020. That same year she won as Album of the Year, Record of the Year, and Song of the Year all in one night.

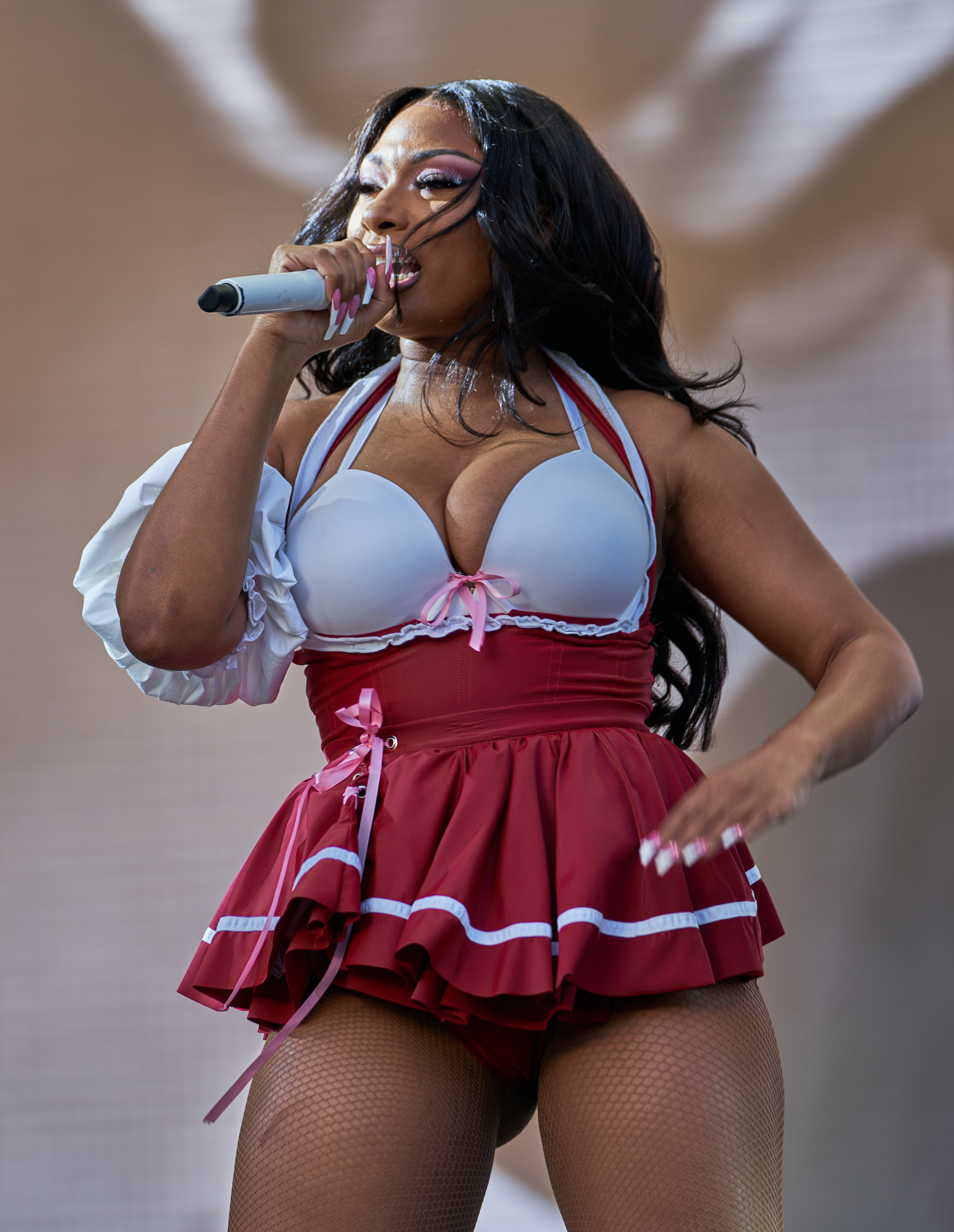
Megan Thee Stallion won in 2021.

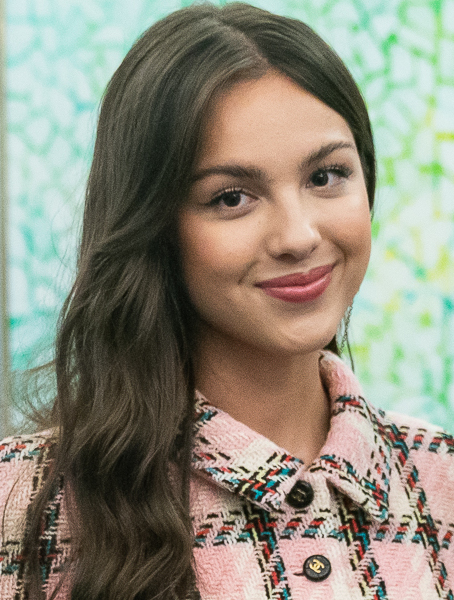
Olivia Rodrigo won in 2022.

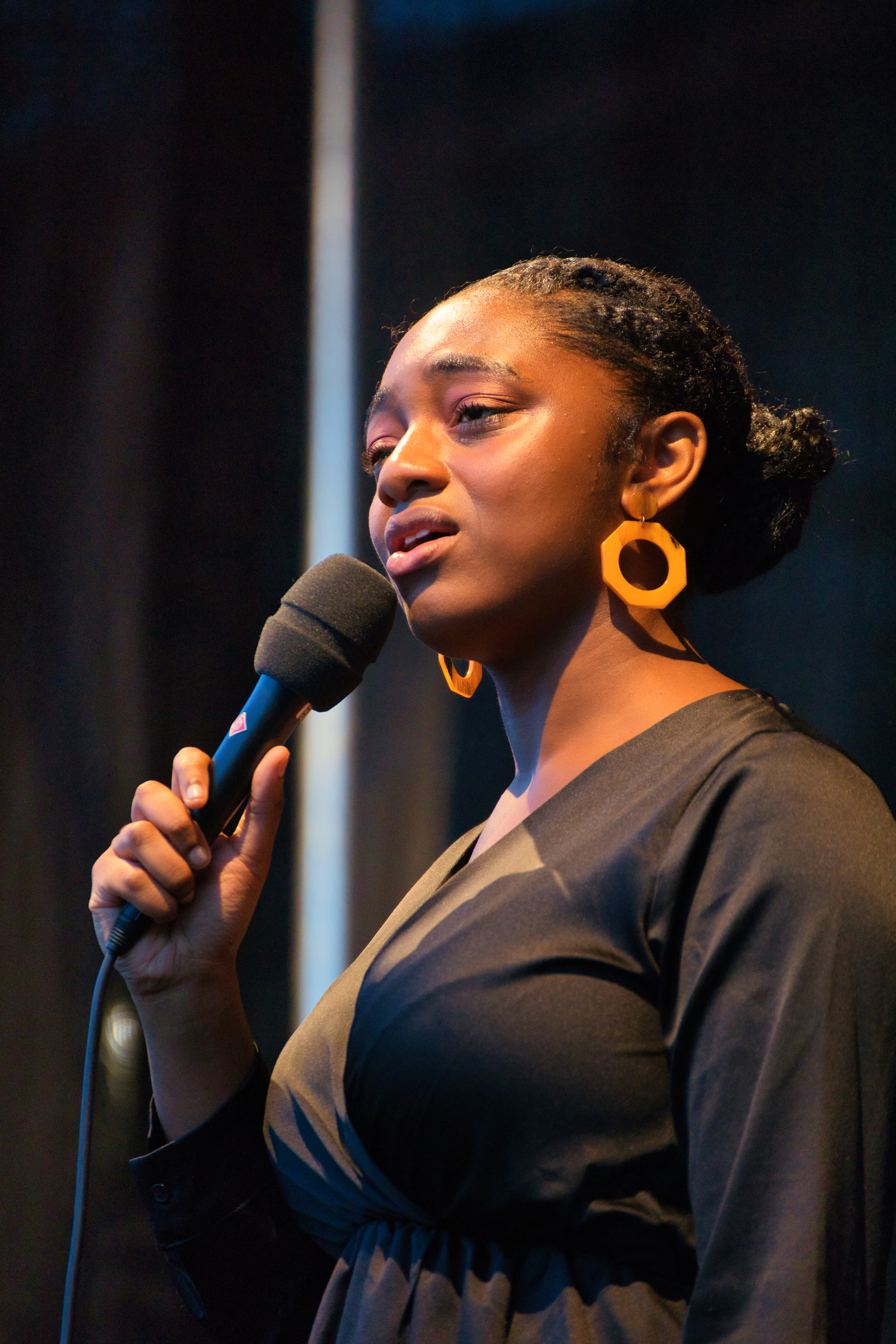
Samara Joy won in 2023.

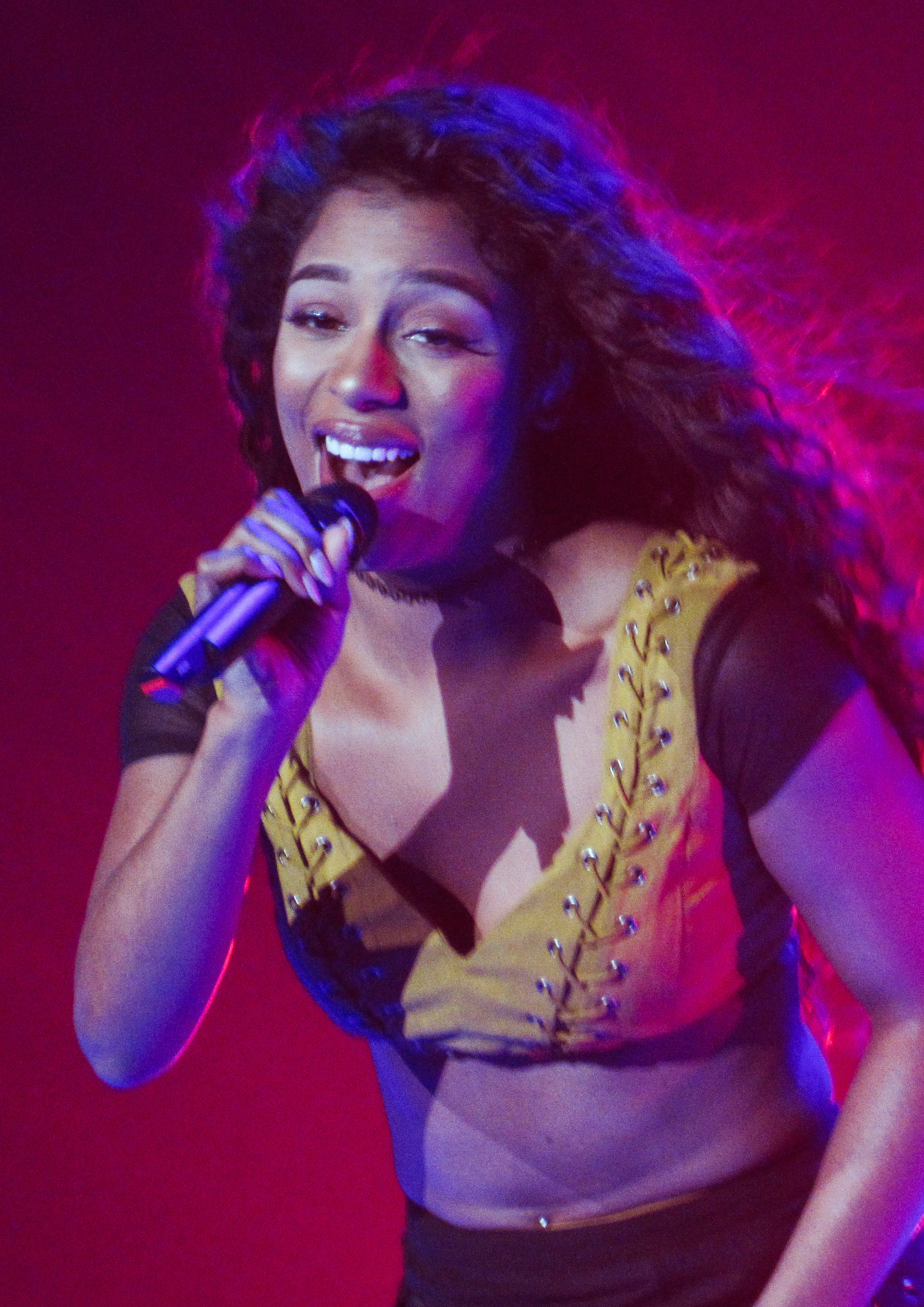
Victoria Monet won in 2024.

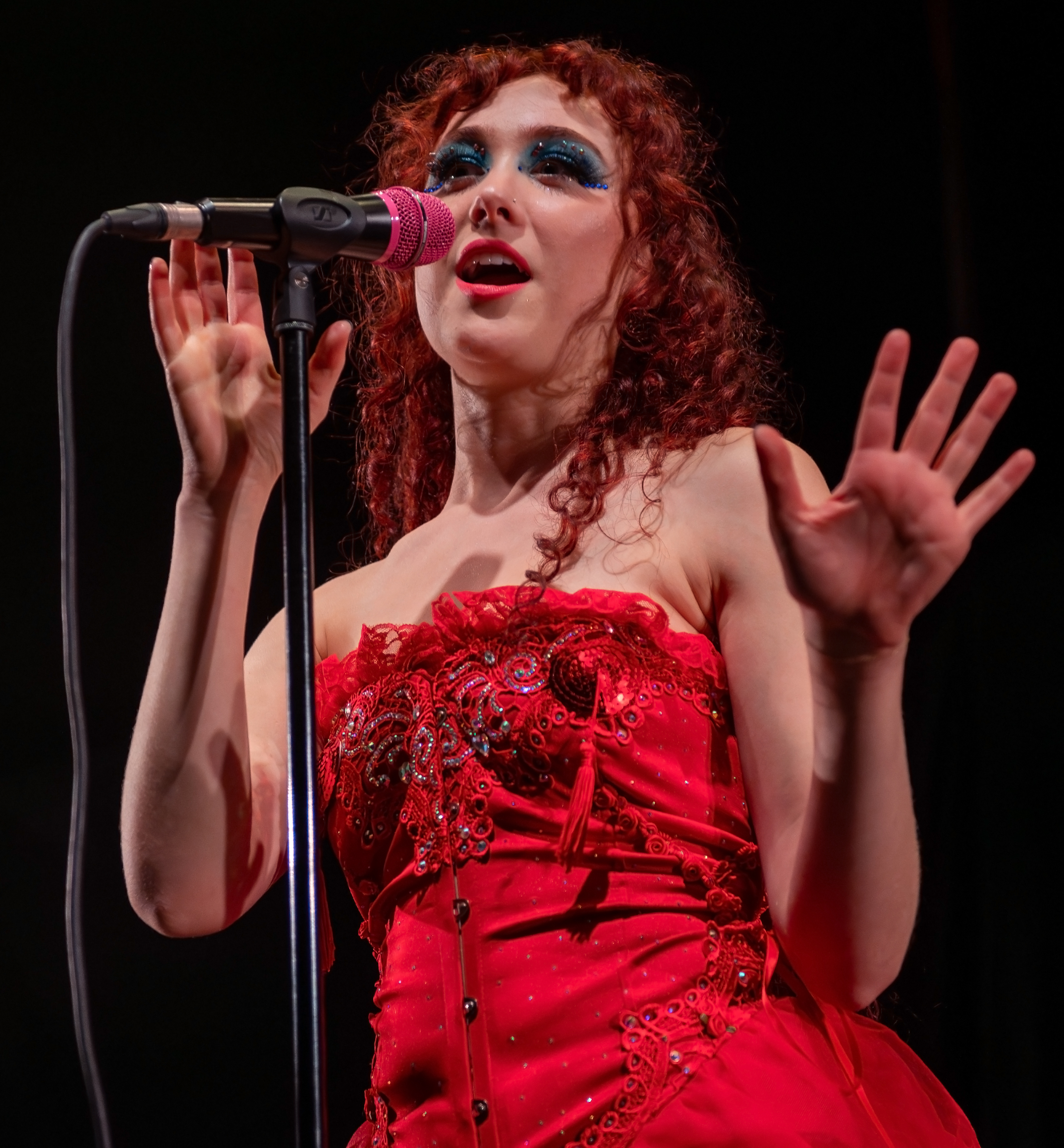
Chappell Roan won in 2025.

=== 1960s ===
Year^{[I]}	Performing Artist
1960	Bobby Darin
1960	Edd Byrnes
1960	Mark Murphy
1960	Johnny Restivo
1960	Mavis Rivers
1961	Bob Newhart
1961	The Brothers Four
1961	Miriam Makeba
1961	Leontyne Price
1961	Joanie Sommers
1962	Peter Nero
1962	Ann-Margret
1962	Dick Gregory
1962	The Lettermen
1962	Timi Yuro
1963	Robert Goulet
1963	The Four Seasons
1963	Vaughn Meader
1963	The New Christy Minstrels
1963	Peter, Paul and Mary
1963	Allan Sherman
1964	The Swingle Singers
1964	Vikki Carr
1964	John Gary
1964	The J's with Jamie
1964	Trini Lopez
1965	The Beatles
1965	Petula Clark
1965	Astrud Gilberto
1965	Antonio Carlos Jobim
1965	Morgana King
1966	Tom Jones
1966	The Byrds
1966	Herman's Hermits
1966	Horst Jankowski
1966	Marilyn Maye
1966	Sonny & Cher
1966	Glenn Yarbrough
1967	No award^{[II]}
1968	Bobbie Gentry
1968	Lana Cantrell
1968	The 5th Dimension
1968	Harpers Bizarre
1968	Jefferson Airplane
1969	José Feliciano
1969	Cream
1969	Gary Puckett & The Union Gap
1969	Jeannie C. Riley
1969	O. C. Smith

=== 1970s ===
Year^{[I]}	Performing Artist
1970	Crosby, Stills & Nash
1970	Chicago
1970	Led Zeppelin
1970	Oliver
1970	The Neon Philharmonic
1971	The Carpenters
1971	Elton John
1971	Melba Moore
1971	Anne Murray
1971	The Partridge Family
1972	Carly Simon
1972	Chase
1972	Emerson, Lake & Palmer
1972	Hamilton, Joe Frank & Reynolds
1972	Bill Withers
1973	America
1973	Harry Chapin
1973	Eagles
1973	Loggins and Messina
1973	John Prine
1974	Bette Midler
1974	Eumir Deodato
1974	Maureen McGovern
1974	Marie Osmond
1974	Barry White
1975	Marvin Hamlisch
1975	Bad Company
1975	Johnny Bristol
1975	David Essex
1975	Graham Central Station
1975	Phoebe Snow
1976	Natalie Cole
1976	Morris Albert
1976	Amazing Rhythm Aces
1976	Brecker Brothers
1976	KC and the Sunshine Band
1977	Starland Vocal Band
1977	Boston
1977	The Brothers Johnson
1977	Dr. Buzzard's Original Savannah Band
1977	Wild Cherry
1978	Debby Boone
1978	Stephen Bishop
1978	Shaun Cassidy
1978	Foreigner
1978	Andy Gibb
1979	A Taste of Honey
1979	The Cars
1979	Elvis Costello
1979	Chris Rea
1979	Toto

=== 1980s ===
Year^{[I]}	Performing Artist
1980	Rickie Lee Jones
1980	The Blues Brothers
1980	Dire Straits
1980	The Knack
1980	Robin Williams
1981	Christopher Cross
1981	Irene Cara
1981	Robbie Dupree
1981	Amy Holland
1981	The Pretenders
1982	Sheena Easton
1982	Adam and the Ants
1982	The Go-Go's
1982	James Ingram
1982	Luther Vandross
1983	Men at Work
1983	Asia
1983	Jennifer Holliday
1983	The Human League
1983	Stray Cats
1984	Culture Club
1984	Big Country
1984	Eurythmics
1984	Men Without Hats
1984	Musical Youth
1985	Cyndi Lauper
1985	Sheila E.
1985	Frankie Goes to Hollywood
1985	Corey Hart
1985	The Judds
1986	Sade
1986	A-ha
1986	Freddie Jackson
1986	Katrina and the Waves
1986	Julian Lennon
1987	Bruce Hornsby & The Range
1987	Glass Tiger
1987	Nu Shooz
1987	Simply Red
1987	Timbuk3
1988	Jody Watley
1988	Breakfast Club
1988	Cutting Crew
1988	Terence Trent D'Arby
1988	Swing Out Sister
1989	Tracy Chapman
1989	Rick Astley
1989	Toni Childs
1989	Take 6
1989	Vanessa L. Williams

=== 1990s ===
Year^{[I]}	Performing Artist
1990	Milli Vanilli (later revoked)^{[III]}
1990	Neneh Cherry
1990	Indigo Girls
1990	Tone Lōc
1990	Soul II Soul
1991	Mariah Carey
1991	The Black Crowes
1991	The Kentucky Headhunters
1991	Lisa Stansfield
1991	Wilson Phillips
1992	Marc Cohn
1992	Boyz II Men
1992	C+C Music Factory
1992	Color Me Badd
1992	Seal
1993	Arrested Development
1993	Billy Ray Cyrus
1993	Sophie B. Hawkins
1993	Kris Kross
1993	Jon Secada
1994	Toni Braxton
1994	Belly
1994	Blind Melon
1994	Digable Planets
1994	SWV
1995	Sheryl Crow
1995	Ace of Base
1995	Counting Crows
1995	Crash Test Dummies
1995	Green Day
1996	Hootie & the Blowfish
1996	Brandy
1996	Alanis Morissette
1996	Joan Osborne
1996	Shania Twain
1997	LeAnn Rimes
1997	Garbage
1997	Jewel
1997	No Doubt
1997	The Tony Rich Project
1998	Paula Cole
1998	Fiona Apple
1998	Erykah Badu
1998	Hanson
1998	Puff Daddy
1999	Lauryn Hill
1999	Backstreet Boys
1999	Andrea Bocelli
1999	Dixie Chicks
1999	Natalie Imbruglia

=== 2000s ===
Year^{[I]}	Performing Artist
2000	Christina Aguilera
2000	Macy Gray
2000	Kid Rock
2000	Britney Spears
2000	Susan Tedeschi
2001	Shelby Lynne
2001	Brad Paisley
2001	Papa Roach
2001	Jill Scott
2001	Sisqó
2002	Alicia Keys
2002	India Arie
2002	Nelly Furtado
2002	David Gray
2002	Linkin Park
2003	Norah Jones
2003	Ashanti
2003	Michelle Branch
2003	Avril Lavigne
2003	John Mayer
2004	Evanescence
2004	50 Cent
2004	Fountains of Wayne
2004	Heather Headley
2004	Sean Paul
2005	Maroon 5
2005	Los Lonely Boys
2005	Joss Stone
2005	Kanye West
2005	Gretchen Wilson
2006	John Legend
2006	Ciara
2006	Fall Out Boy
2006	Keane
2006	Sugarland
2007	Carrie Underwood
2007	James Blunt
2007	Chris Brown
2007	Imogen Heap
2007	Corinne Bailey Rae
2008	Amy Winehouse
2008	Feist
2008	Ledisi
2008	Paramore
2008	Taylor Swift
2009	Adele
2009	Duffy
2009	Jonas Brothers
2009	Lady Antebellum
2009	Jazmine Sullivan

=== 2010s ===
Year^{[I]}	Performing Artist
2010	Zac Brown Band
2010	Keri Hilson
2010	MGMT
2010	Silversun Pickups
2010	The Ting Tings
2011	Esperanza Spalding
2011	Justin Bieber
2011	Drake
2011	Florence and the Machine
2011	Mumford & Sons
2012	Bon Iver
2012	The Band Perry
2012	J. Cole
2012	Nicki Minaj
2012	Skrillex
2013	Fun
2013	Alabama Shakes
2013	Hunter Hayes
2013	The Lumineers
2013	Frank Ocean
2014	Macklemore & Ryan Lewis
2014	James Blake
2014	Kendrick Lamar
2014	Kacey Musgraves
2014	Ed Sheeran
2015	Sam Smith
2015	Iggy Azalea
2015	Bastille
2015	Brandy Clark
2015	Haim
2016	Meghan Trainor
2016	Courtney Barnett
2016	James Bay
2016	Sam Hunt
2016	Tori Kelly
2017	Chance the Rapper
2017	Kelsea Ballerini
2017	The Chainsmokers
2017	Maren Morris
2017	Anderson .Paak
2018	Alessia Cara
2018	Khalid
2018	Lil Uzi Vert
2018	Julia Michaels
2018	SZA
2019	Dua Lipa
2019	Chloe x Halle
2019	Luke Combs
2019	Greta Van Fleet
2019	H.E.R.
2019	Margo Price
2019	Bebe Rexha
2019	Jorja Smith

=== 2020s ===
Year^{[I]}	Performing Artist
2020	Billie Eilish
2020	Black Pumas
2020	Lil Nas X
2020	Lizzo
2020	Maggie Rogers
2020	Rosalía
2020	Tank and the Bangas
2020	Yola
2021	Megan Thee Stallion
2021	Ingrid Andress
2021	Phoebe Bridgers
2021	Chika
2021	Noah Cyrus
2021	D Smoke
2021	Doja Cat
2021	Kaytranada
2022	Olivia Rodrigo
2022	Arooj Aftab
2022	Jimmie Allen
2022	Baby Keem
2022	Finneas
2022	Glass Animals
2022	Japanese Breakfast
2022	The Kid Laroi
2022	Arlo Parks
2022	Saweetie
2023	Samara Joy
2023	Anitta
2023	Omar Apollo
2023	Domi & JD Beck
2023	Latto
2023	Måneskin
2023	Muni Long
2023	Tobe Nwigwe
2023	Molly Tuttle
2023	Wet Leg
2024	Victoria Monét
2024	Gracie Abrams
2024	Fred Again
2024	Ice Spice
2024	Jelly Roll
2024	Coco Jones
2024	Noah Kahan
2024	The War and Treaty
2025	Chappell Roan
2025	Benson Boone
2025	Sabrina Carpenter
2025	Doechii
2025	Khruangbin
2025	Raye
2025	Shaboozey
2025	Teddy Swims
2026	Olivia Dean
2026	Katseye
2026	The Marías
2026	Addison Rae
2026	Sombr
2026	Leon Thomas
2026	Alex Warren
2026	Lola Young
2027
2027	Angine de Poitrine
2027	Geese
2027	Ella Langley
2027	Slayyyter
2027	Sienna Spiro
2027	Don Toliver
2027	Remi Wolf
2027	The Womack Sisters

== Notes ==
^{^[I]} Each year is linked to the article about the Grammy Awards held that year.
^{^[II]} The Grammy Award for Best New Artist was not presented during the 9th Grammy Awards.
^{^[III]} Milli Vanilli were originally presented with the award on February 21, 1990, but the award was revoked on November 19, 1990, following an admission by band members Fab Morvan and Rob Pilatus that they were not the actual singers on the album. The category was declared vacant for 1990.

== See also ==
- List of Grammy Award categories
- Latin Grammy Award for Best New Artist
