= Johnny Restivo =

American rock musician active in the late 1950s and early 1960s

- Born: John Charles Restivo; September 13, 1943 (age 82); The Bronx, New York, U.S.A.
- Genres: Rock 'n' Roll
- Years active: 1958–1978
- Labels: RCA Victor

Johnny Restivo is a former American rock and roll vocalist.

Restivo was born in The Bronx and released a single with RCA Victor when he was only fifteen years old. That single, "The Shape I'm In/Ya Ya", reached #80 on the Billboard Hot 100. Restivo was nominated for a Grammy Award for Best New Artist, but lost to Bobby Darin. Restivo never charted another hit. Johnny also achieved fame as a muscular young bodybuilder while in his teens. He was on the covers of the magazines Tomorrow's Man and Model Parade.

"The Shape I'm In", written by Lee Cathy and Otis Blackwell, was covered by Dave Edmunds (on Information), Shakin' Stevens (on Lipstick, Powder and Paint) and The Black Sorrows (single from Rockin' Zydeco).

== Discography ==
=== Albums ===
- The Shape I'm In (RCA Victor, 1959)
- Oh Johnny! (RCA Victor, 1959)

=== EPs ===
- "Smarty" (CBS, 1967)
- "Go, Go, Eskimo!" (CBS 1967)
