= List of basses in non-classical music =

The bass singing voice has a vocal range that lies around the second E below middle C to the E above middle C (i.e., E_{2}–E_{4}). As with the contralto singing voice being the rarest female voice type, the bass voice is the rarest for males, and has the lowest vocal range of all voice types. However, the bass voice is determined not only by its vocal range, but also by its timbre, which tends to be darker than that of a baritone voice.

The term bass was developed in relation to classical and operatic voices, where the classification is based not merely on the singer's vocal range but also on the tessitura and timbre of the voice. For classical and operatic singers, their voice type determines the roles they will sing and is a primary method of categorization. In non-classical music, singers are primarily defined by their genre and their gender and not by their vocal range. When the terms soprano, mezzo-soprano, contralto, tenor, baritone, and bass are used as descriptors of non-classical voices, they are applied more loosely than they would be to those of classical singers and generally refer only to the singer's perceived vocal range.

The following is a list of singers in country, popular music, jazz, and musical theatre (Note: For a detailed description of the differences between the operatic and musical theatre voice see Björkner, Eva, Why so different? Aspects of voice characteristics in operatic and musical theatre singing, KTH School of Computer Science and Communication, 2006 (ISBN 9171785183)) who have been described as basses.

== List of names ==
Name	Lifespan	Nationality	Associated act(s)	Ref.
Joe Ames	1921–2007	American	Ames Brothers	
Bobby Bass	1998–	American		
Lance Bass	1979–	American	NSYNC	
Bob Bingham	1946–2025	American		
21 Savage	1992-	British		
Greg Brown	1949–	American		
Geoff Castellucci	1980-	American	VoicePlay	
Brian Cole	1942–1972	American	The Association	
Ray Davis	1940–2005	American	The Parliaments; Parliament; Funkadelic	
Elmer Dresslar Jr. (Note: Dresslar was also referred to as a bass-baritone)	1925–2005	American	The Singers Unlimited; The J's with Jamie	
George Sanders	1906-1972	British		
James Farnsworth (Note: Farnsworth was also referred to as a baritone)		British	Out of the Blue	
Tennessee Ernie Ford (Note: Ford has been alternately referred to as a baritone and a bass-baritone)	1919–1991	American		
Markiplier	1989–	American		
Melvin Franklin (Note: Some sources also refer to Franklin as a baritone and a bass-baritone)	1942–1995	American	The Temptations	
Sherman Garnes	1940–1977	American	The Teenagers	
Geoffrey Holder (Note: Holder was also referred to as a bass-baritone)	1930–2014	Trinidadian-American		
Corpse Husband	1997–	American		
Jawan M. Jackson		American	The Temptations	
Avi Kaplan	1989–	American	Pentatonix	
Marc Lavoine	1962–	French		
Till Lindemann (Note: Lindemann is also referred to as a baritone)	1963–	German	Rammstein; Lindemann	
Nick Massi	1927–2000	American	The Four Seasons	
Carlo Mastrangelo (Note: Mastrangelo was also referred to as a bass-baritone and a baritone)	1937–2016	American	The Belmonts	
Michael McCary	1971–	American	Boyz II Men	
Stephin Merritt	1965–	American	The Magnetic Fields; The Gothic Archies; Future Bible Heroes	
Warren "Pete" Moore	1938–2017 or 1939–2017	American	The Miracles	
Rex Nelon	1932–2000	American	The LeFevres	
Patrick Page	1962–	American		
London Parris	1931–1992	American	The Blackwood Brothers	
Ray Perkins	1932–	Canadian	The Crew-Cuts	
Pop Smoke	1999–2020	American		
Thurl Ravenscroft	1914–2005	American	The Mellomen	
Harold Reid	1939–2020	American	The Statler Brothers	
Kevin Richardson	1971–	American	Backstreet Boys	
Paul Robeson (Note: Robeson was also described vocally as a bass-baritone while identifying himself as a baritone)	1898–1976	American		
Matt Sallee	1994–	American	Pentatonix	
Thomas Sanders (Note: Sanders was also referred to as a baritone)	1989–	American		
Peter Steele (Note: Steele was also referred to as a baritone)	1962–2010	American	Type O Negative; Carnivore; Fallout	
Richard Sterban	1943–2026	American	The Oak Ridge Boys	
Tim Storms	1972–	American	Rescue; Acappella; Pierce Arrow	
J. D. Sumner	1924–1998	American	The Blackwood Brothers, The Stamps Quartet	
T.O.P	1986– or 1987–	South Korean	Big Bang	
Ike Turner (Note: Ike Turner was also referred to as a baritone and as a bass-baritone)	1931–2007	American	Ike & Tina Turner; Kings of Rhythm	
Josh Turner (Note: Josh Turner is also referred to as a baritone)	1977–	American		
Ray Walker	1934–	American	The Jordanaires	
Barry White (Note: White was referred to as a bass-baritone)	1944–2003	American	The Love Unlimited Orchestra	
George Younce	1930–2005	American	The Cathedrals	
Tay Zonday (Note: Zonday is also referred to as a baritone)	1982–	American		
Jay Foreman	1984–	English		

== Gallery ==
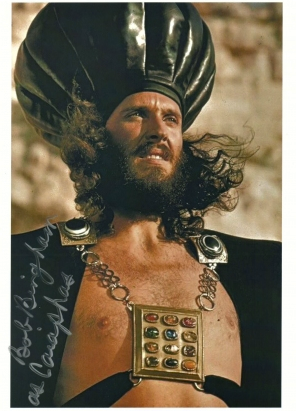
Bob Bingham

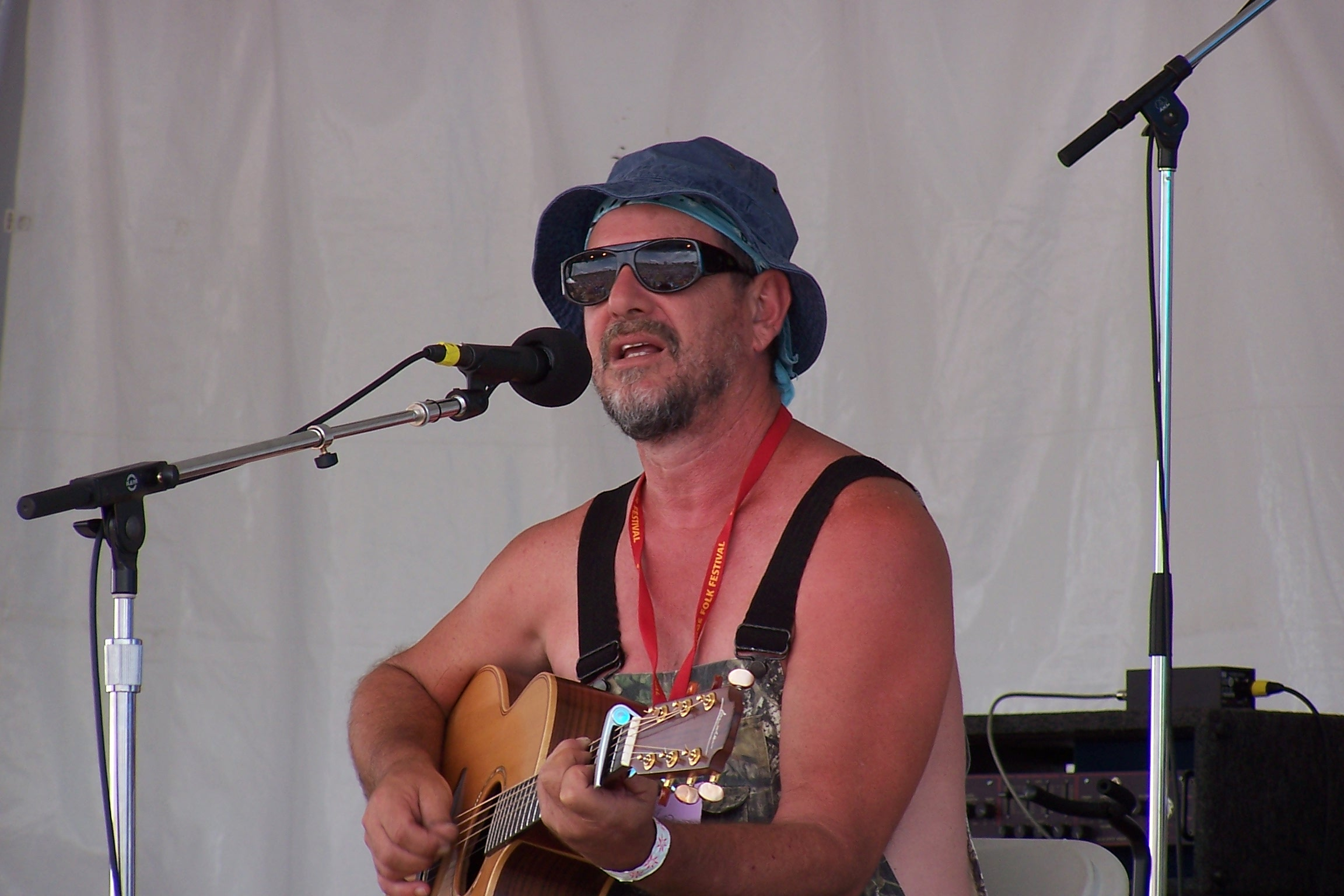
Greg Brown

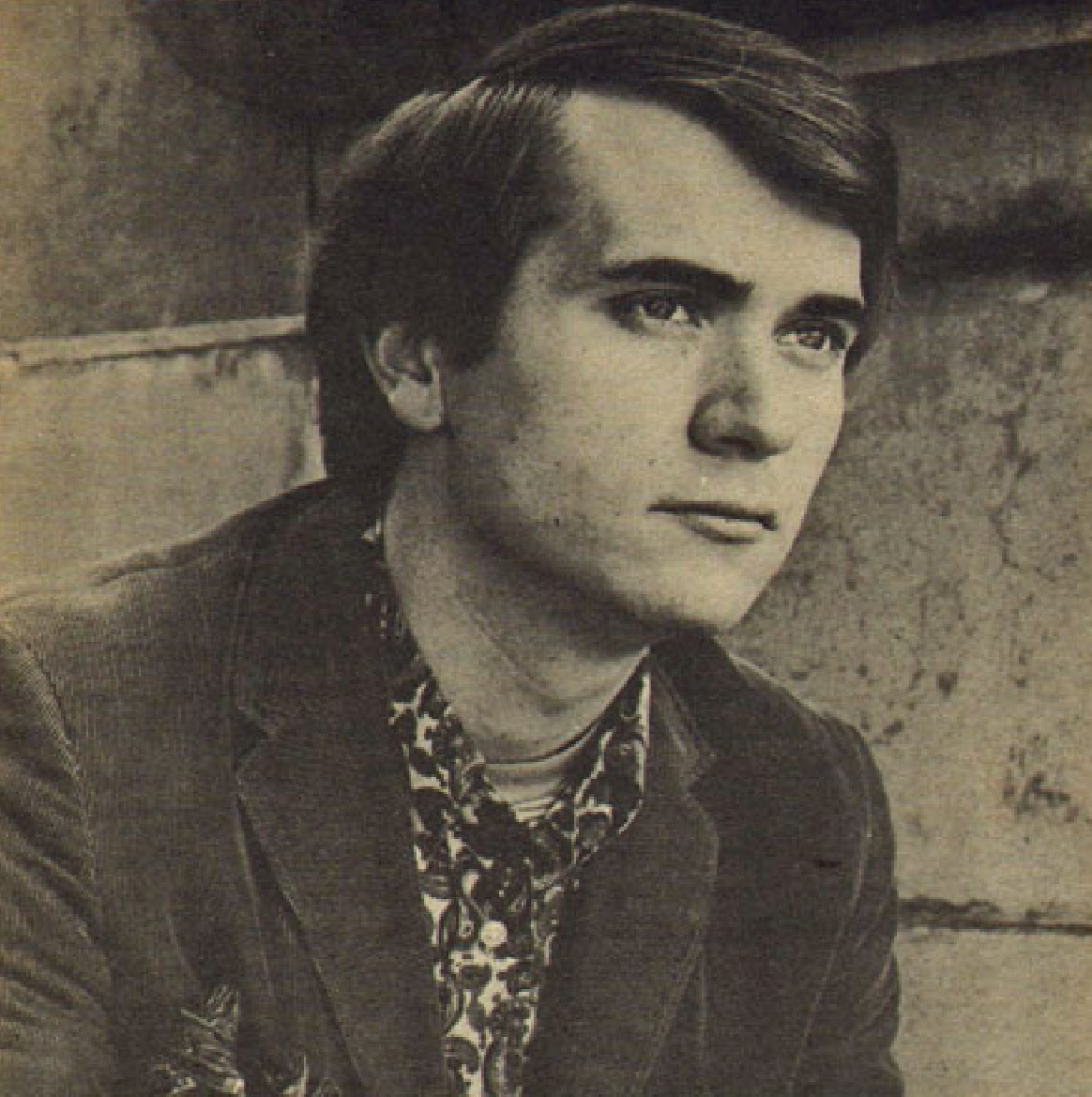
Brian Cole

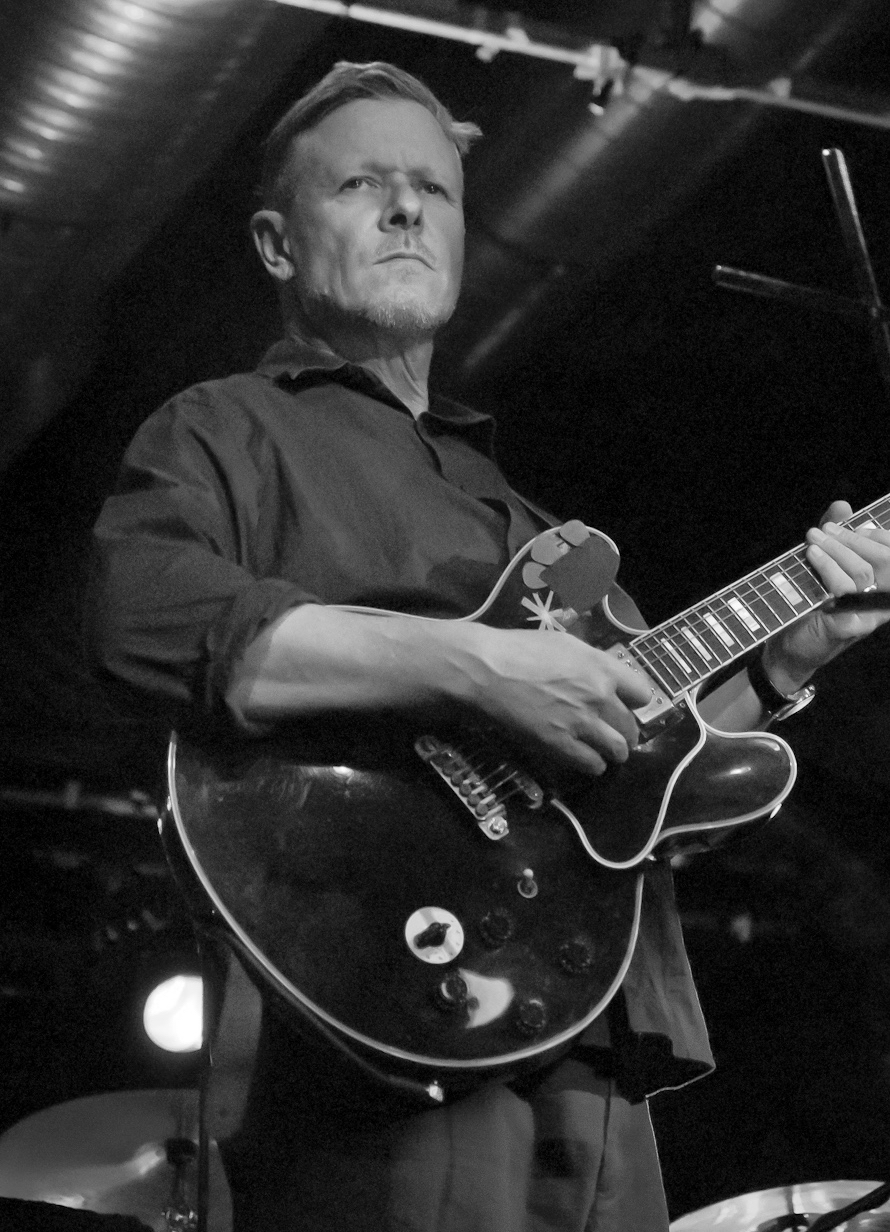
Michael Gira

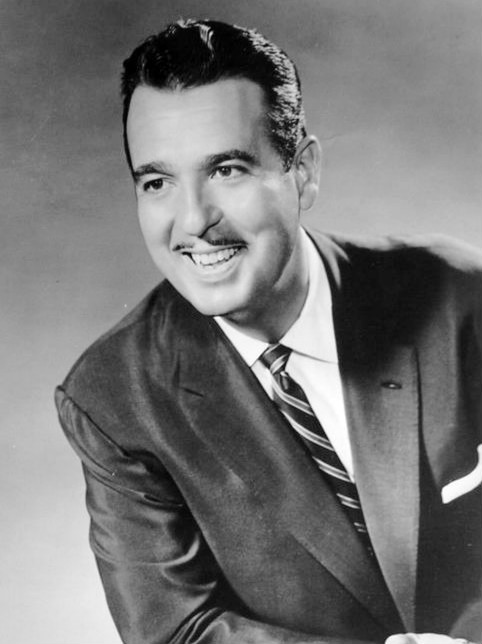
Tennessee Ernie Ford

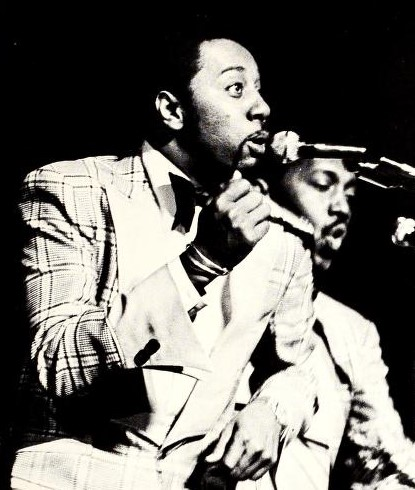
Melvin Franklin

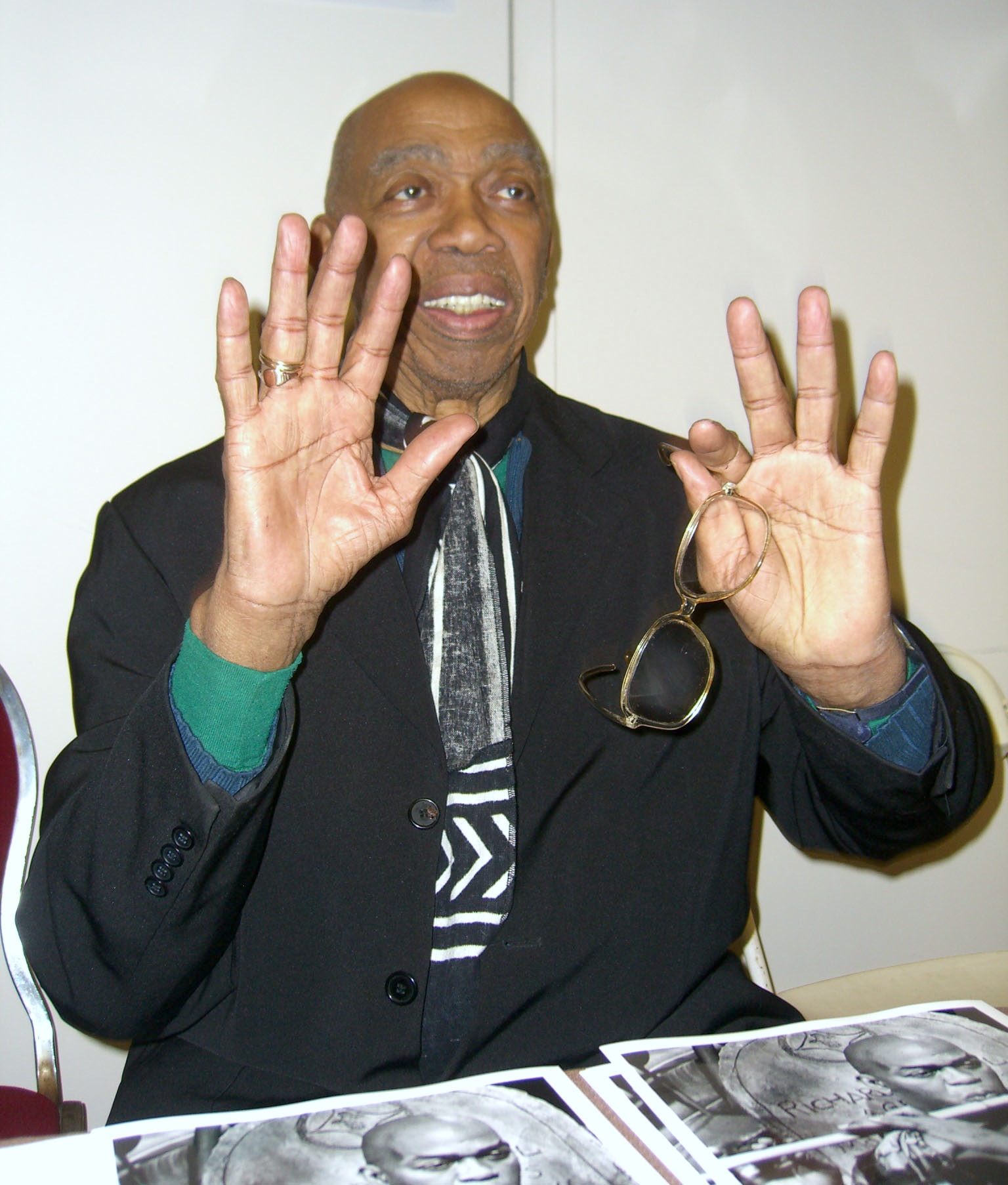
Geoffrey Holder

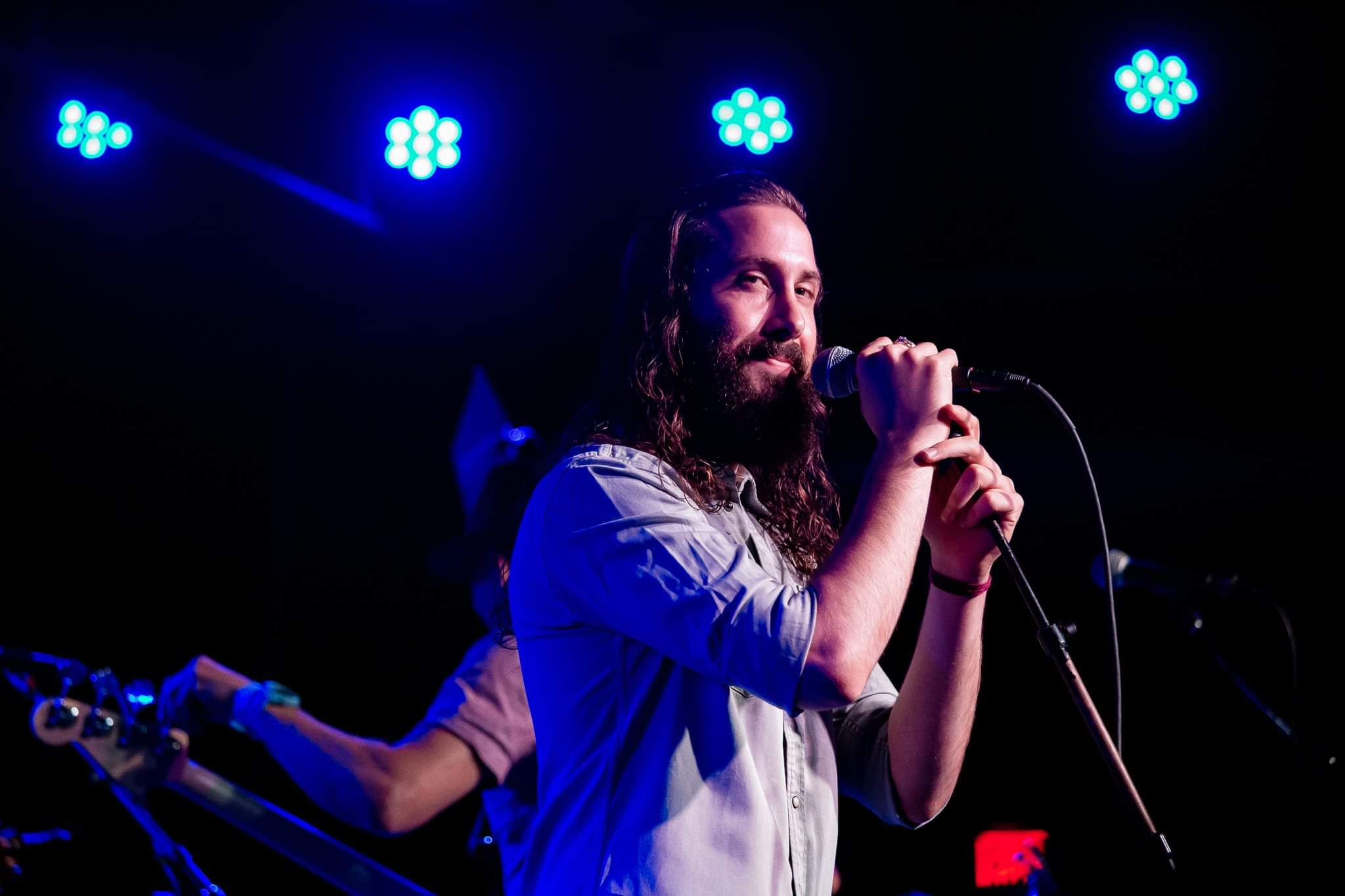
Avi Kaplan

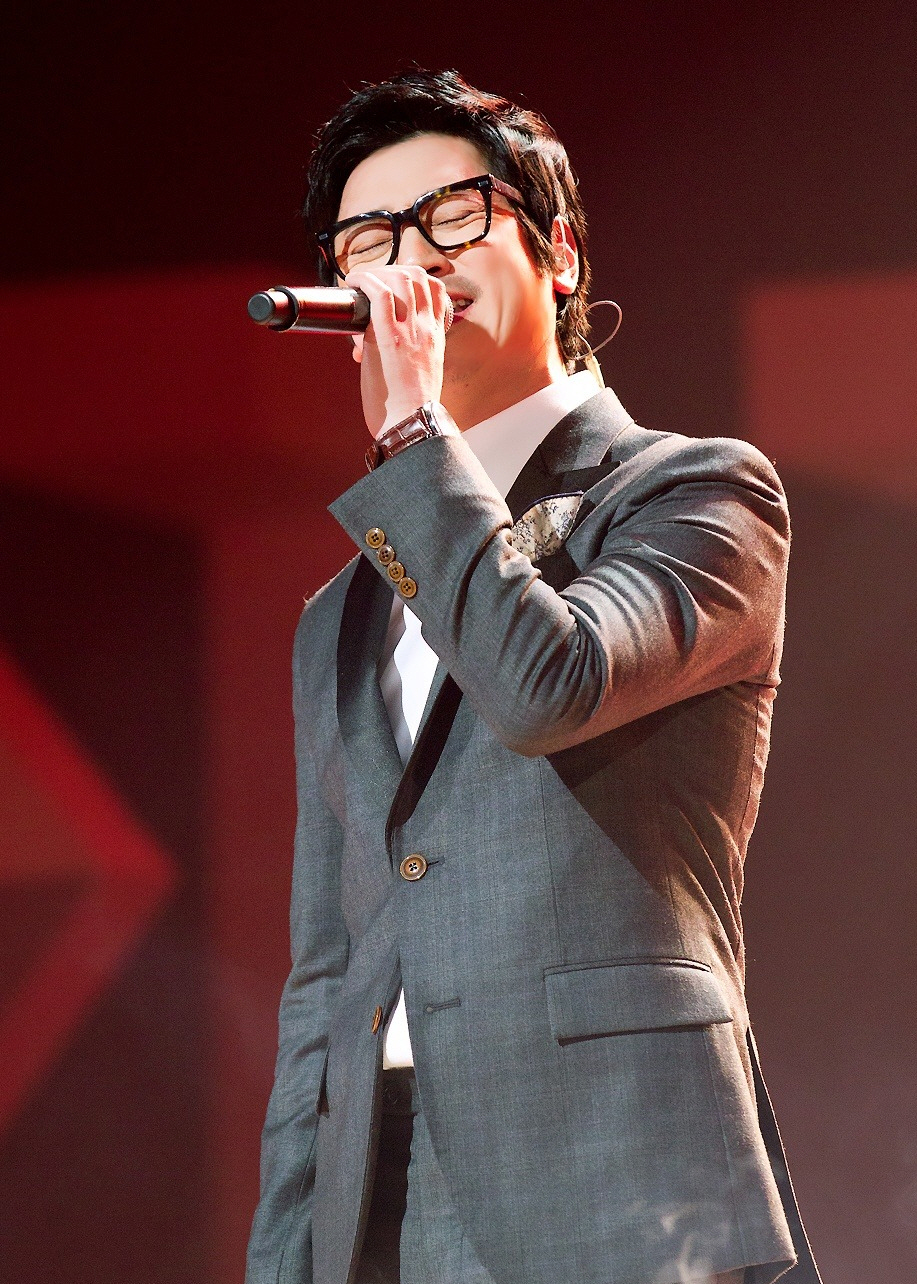
Bobby Kim

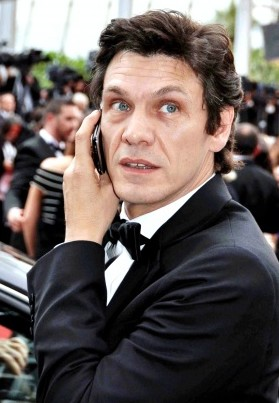
Marc Lavoine

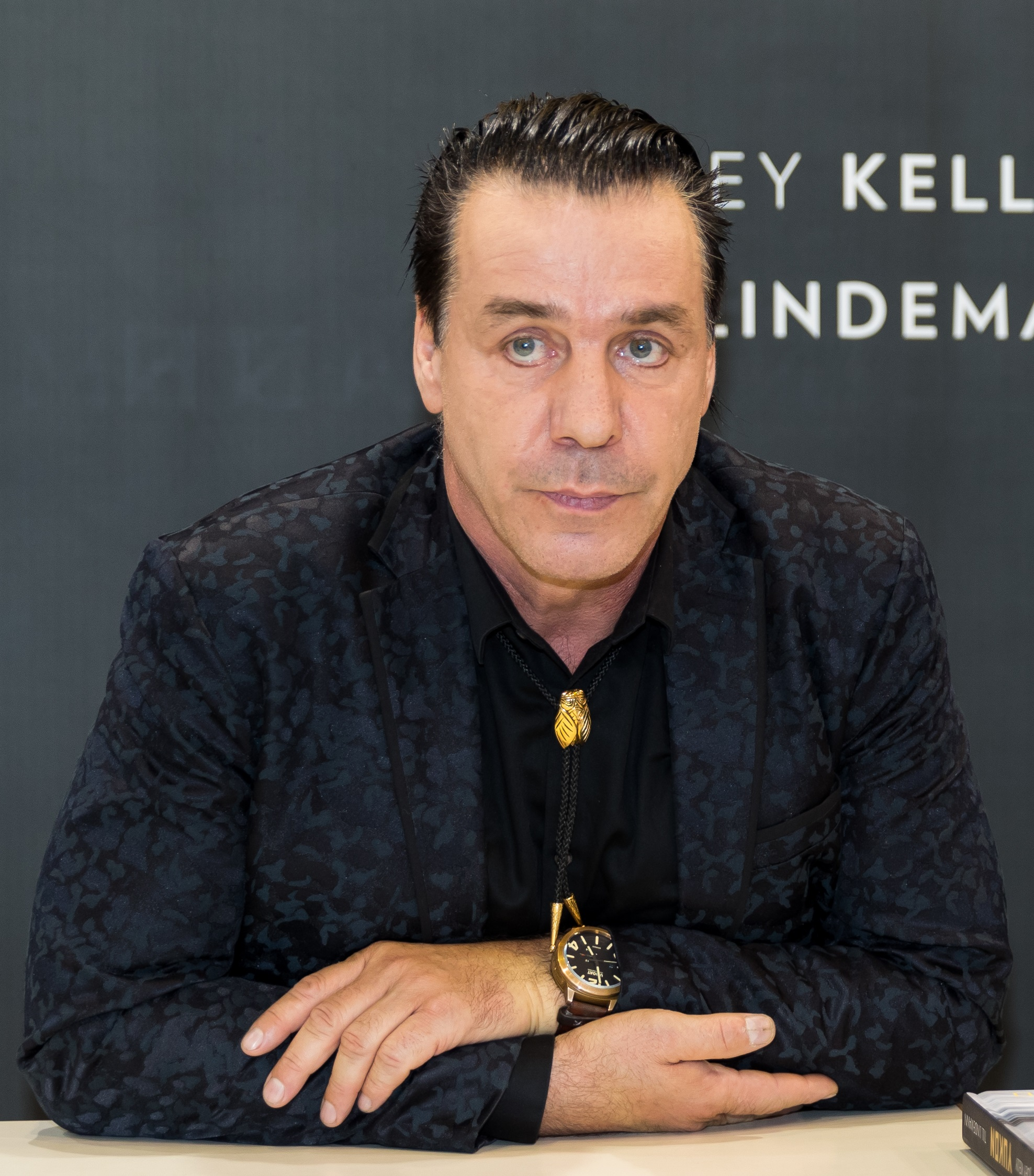
Till Lindemann

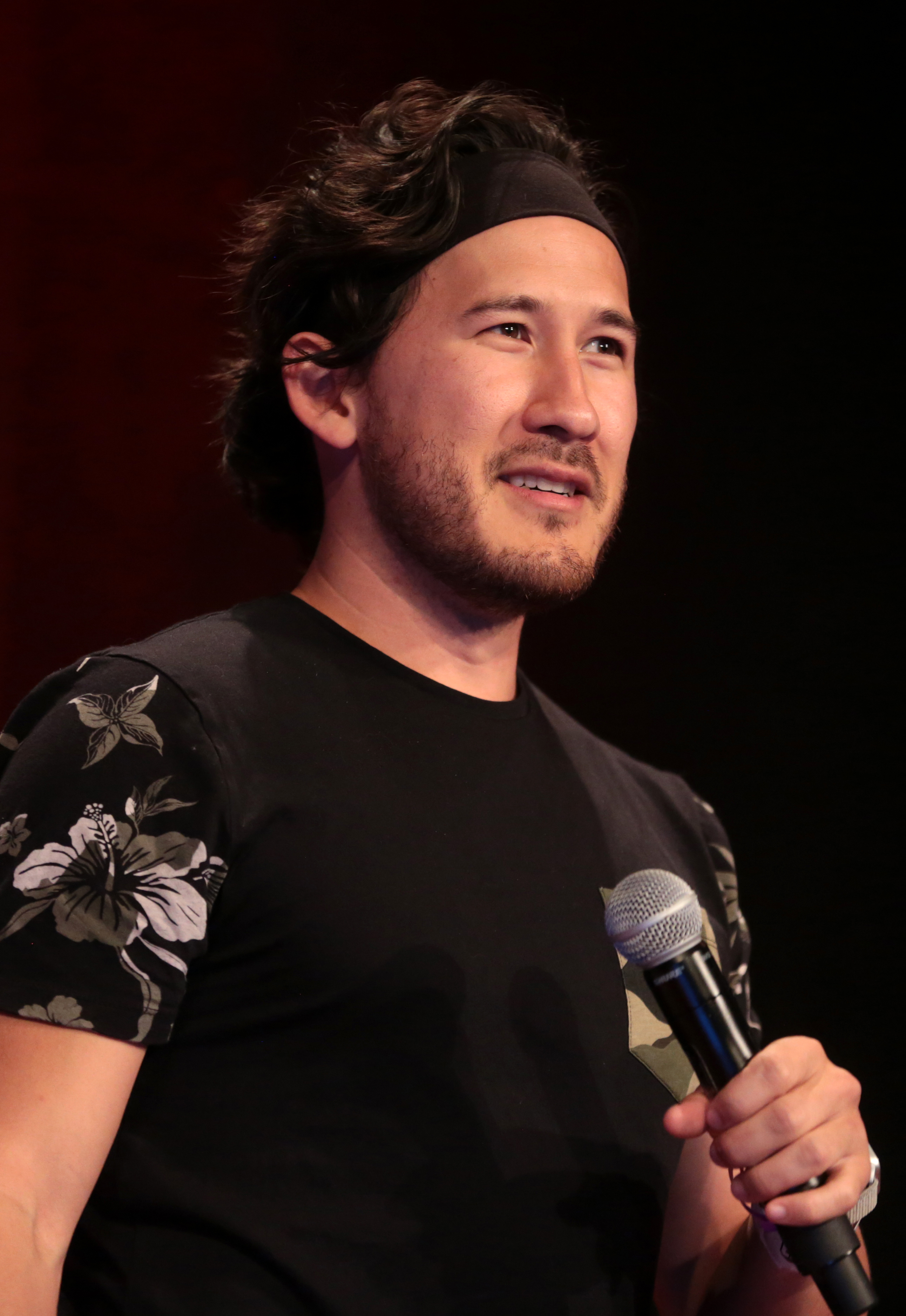
Markiplier

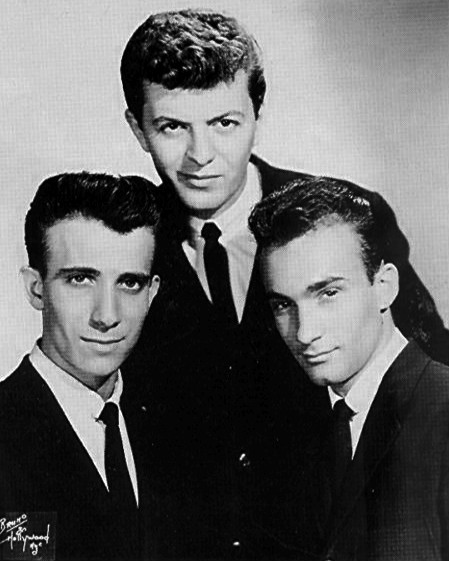
Carlo Mastrangelo (left)

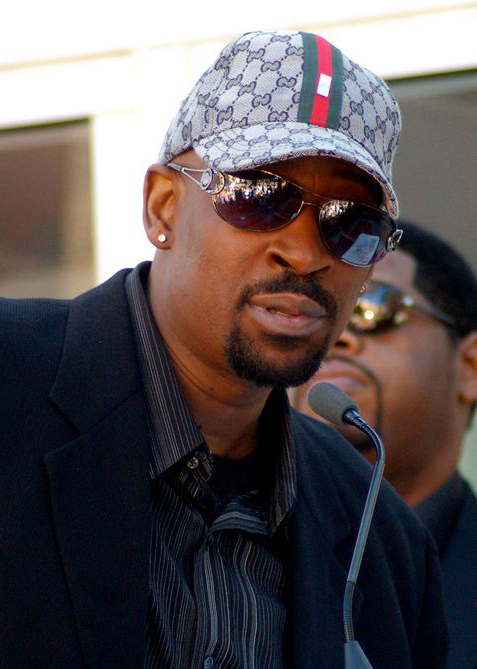
Michael McCary

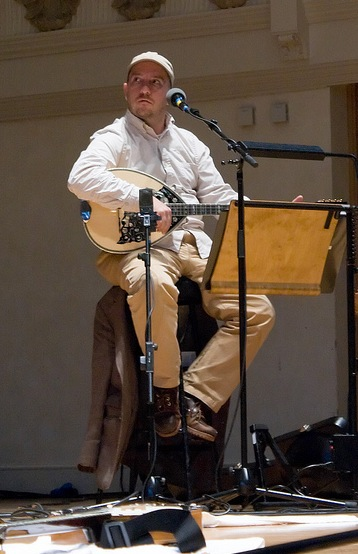
Stephin Merritt

Warren "Pete" Moore

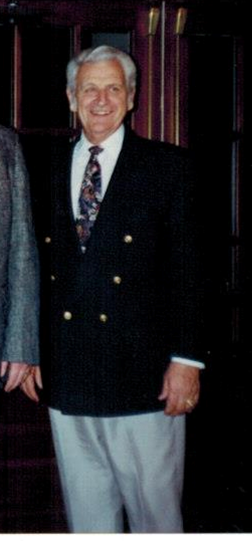
Rex Nelon

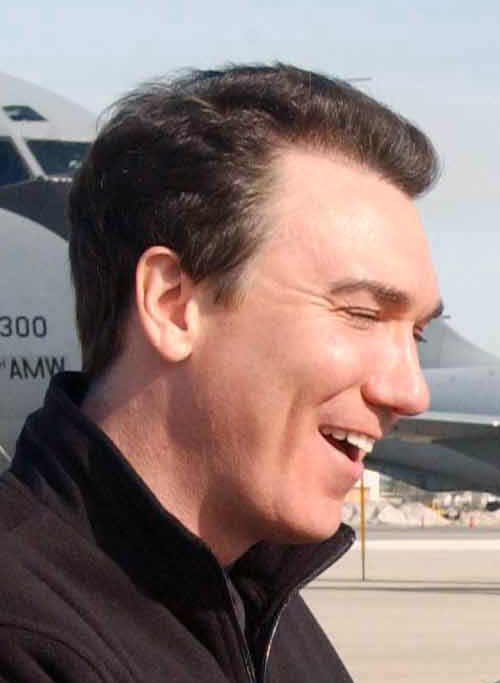
Patrick Page

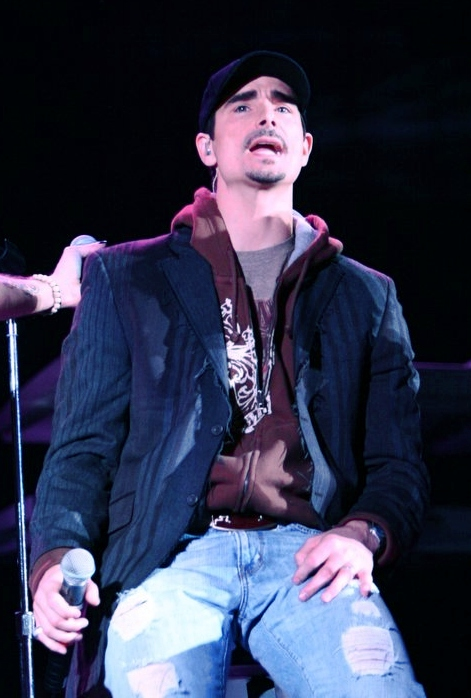
Kevin Richardson

Paul Robeson

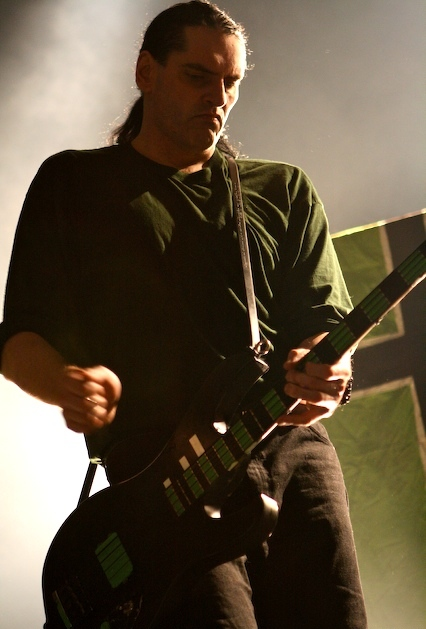
Peter Steele

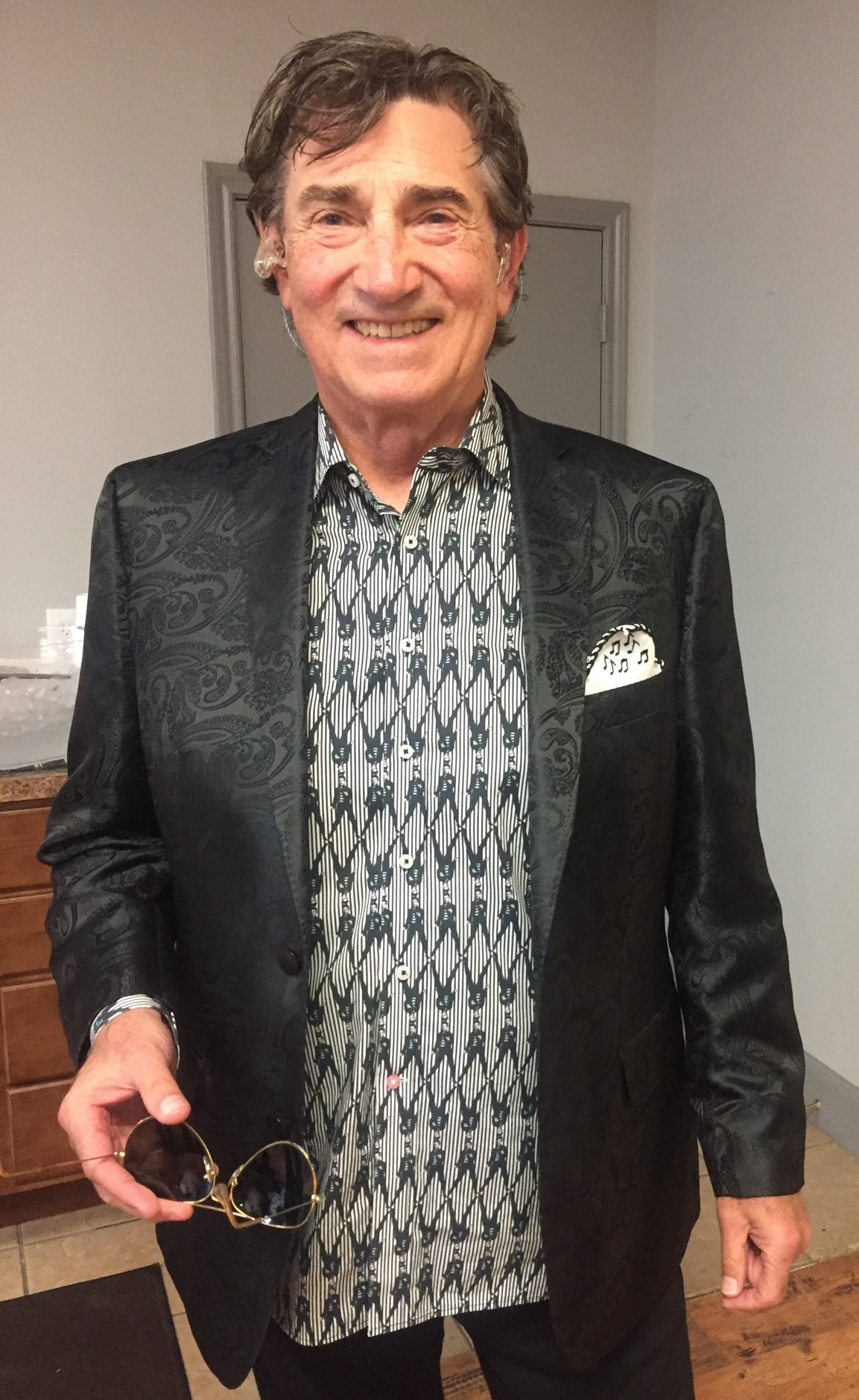
Richard Sterban

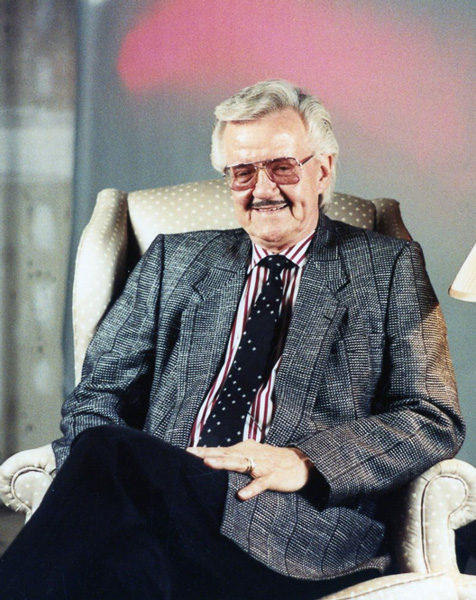
J. D. Sumner

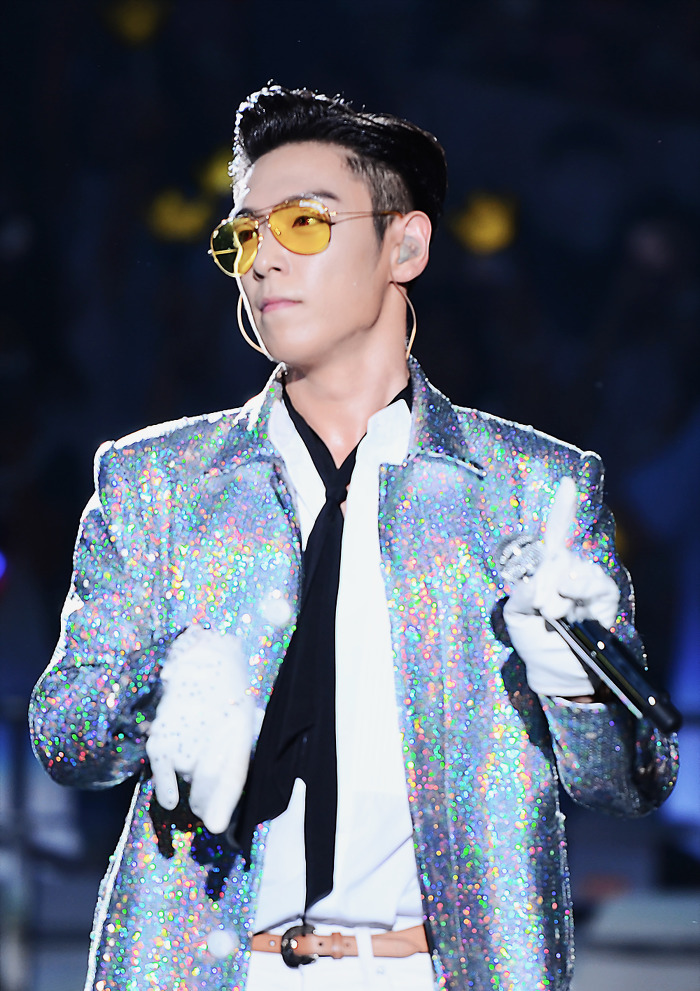
T.O.P

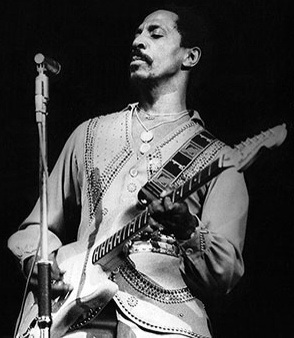
Ike Turner

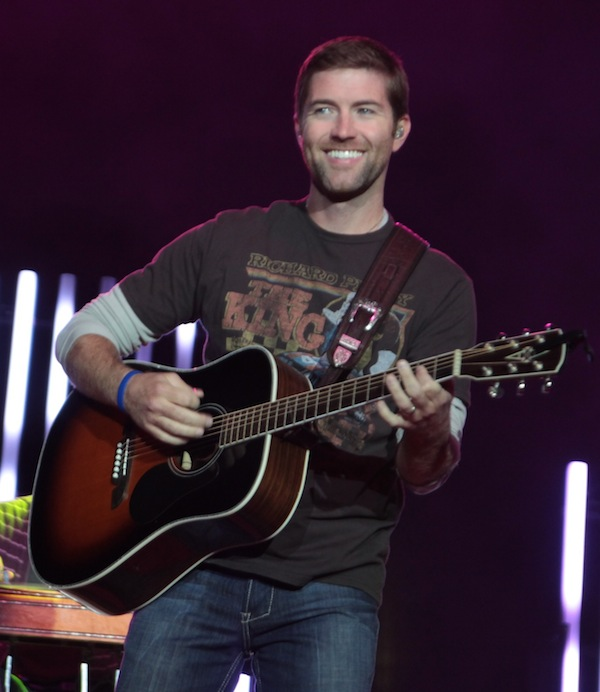
Josh Turner

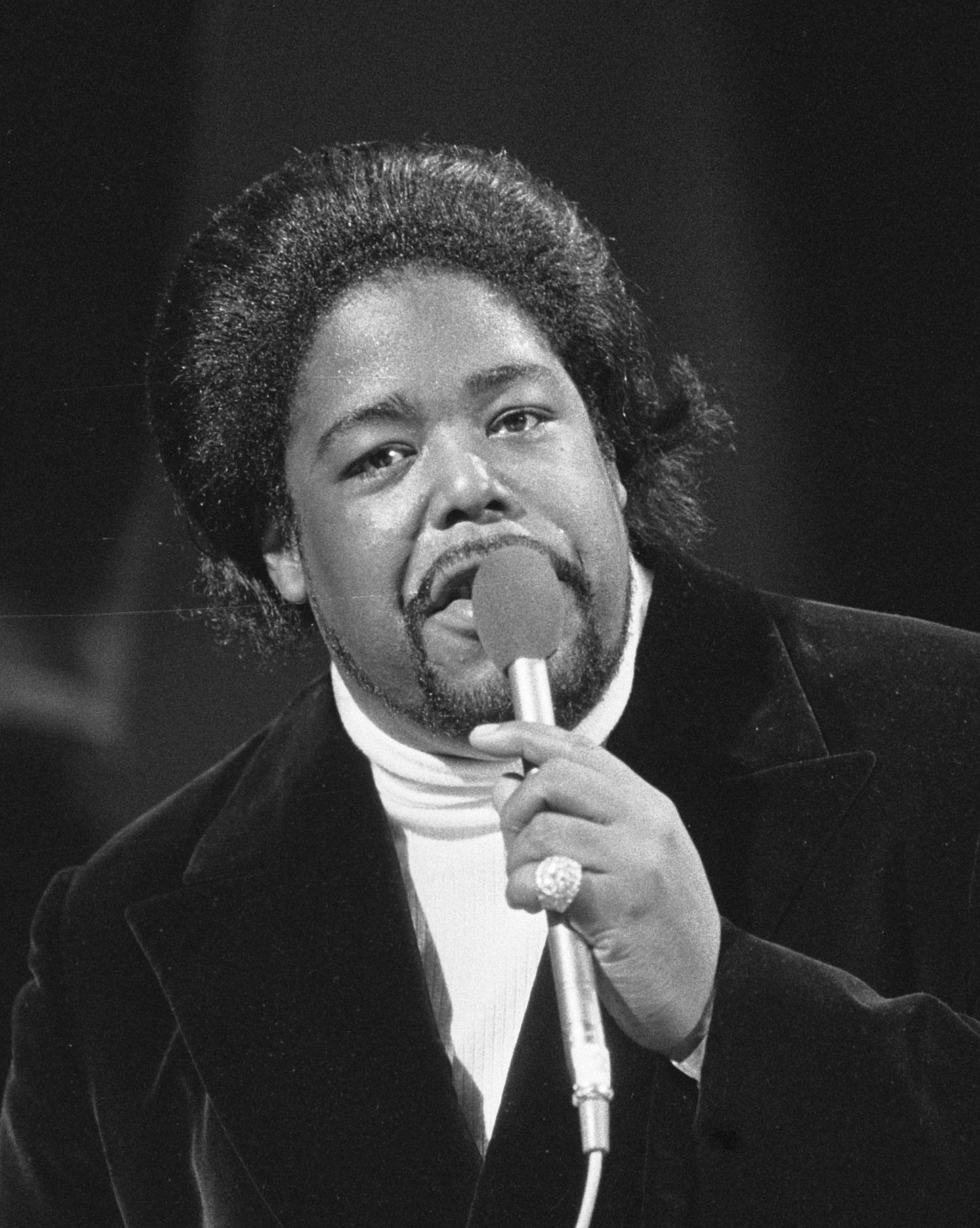
Barry White

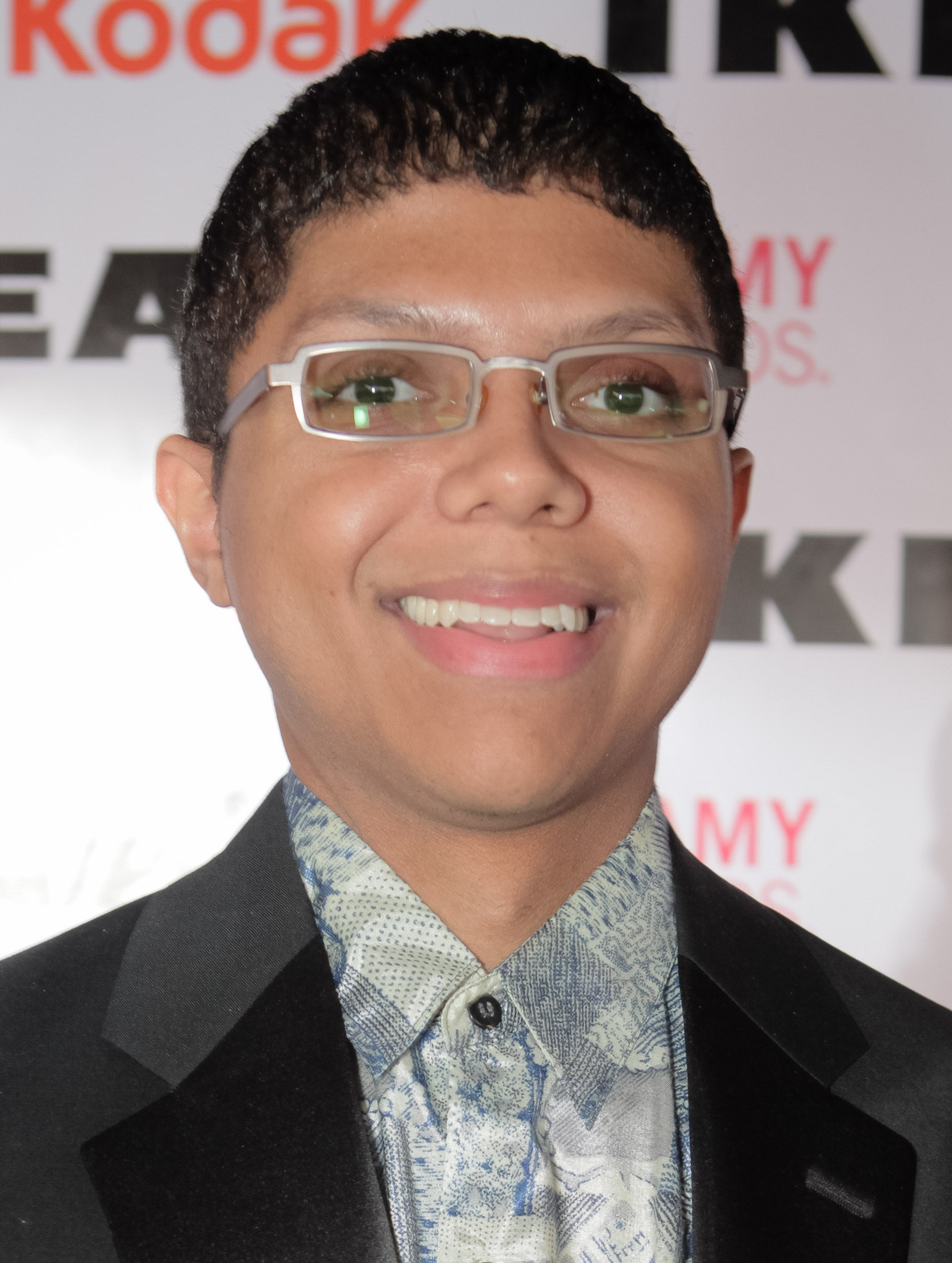
Tay Zonday

== See also ==
- Voice classification in non-classical music
- List of baritones in non-classical music
- List of tenors in non-classical music
- List of contraltos in non-classical music
- List of mezzo-sopranos in non-classical music
- List of sopranos in non-classical music
- Voice type
