= The J's with Jamie =

American musical group (1950s and 1960s)

- Cover art for The two sides of the J's with Jamie (1963) depicting, from left-to-right, Joe Silvia, Don Shelton, Jamie Silvia, and Len Dresslar.

Background information
- Also known as: Jamie and the J. Silvia Singers
- Genres: Jingles, show tunes
- Years active: 1958–1967
- Labels: Columbia Records, ABC
- Past members: Jamie Silvia; Joe Silvia; Don Shelton; Len Dresslar; Marshall Gill

The J's with Jamie was an American musical group specializing in commercial jingles in the 1950s and 1960s. The group's core members were Jamie and Joe Silvia, a married couple who played with a number of session musicians and other singers. They worked within the booming mid-20th century Chicago advertising industry in both radio and television with clients including well-known food companies, politicians, appliance manufacturers, and industry associations. The couple declined invitations to go on tour, opting to stay in Chicago with their family, but did record three albums for Columbia Records, including a combination of original songs and covers of standards and Broadway show tunes. At the 6th Annual Grammy Awards in 1964, The J's with Jamie were nominated in two categories: Best New Artist and Best Performance by a Vocal Group. Shortly before disbanding in 1967 to found a commercial production firm, the Silvias released another two albums as Jamie and the J. Silvia Singers.

== Formation ==
The J's with Jamie was formed by husband and wife Joe and Jamie Silvia. Jamie's background was as a dancer, but she took up singing as a career in her late teens, citing Sarah Vaughan as one of her influences. She went on tour as the lead vocalist for The Mellowlarks in the 1950s but left to form The J's with Jamie in 1958. One year for Christmas, the couple decided to record Christmas songs for their friends instead of sending out a more traditional greeting card. To do so, they went to the Columbia Records recording studio in Chicago. The audio engineer was impressed enough with their performance that he shared the music with Ernie Altschuler in Columbia's artists and repertoire division, leading to a recording contract. (Note: This citation mistakenly calls the group "The Jamies," an error for which it issued a correction in the following issue: "A correction". Billboard Music Week (Archive: 1961-1962). 74 (31): 28. 4 August 1962.)

From their start until the group disbanded in 1967, Jamie and Joe Silvia were the core of the group. They worked with session musicians and a number of other singers. Their most prominent collaborator was Don Shelton, a tenor who was part of The Hi-Lo's, but others included Marshall Gill and Len Dresslar, whose deep bass voice is best known for the Jolly Green Giant's "Ho! Ho! Ho!".

== Jingles and recordings ==
Recounting the group's career years later, Jamie estimated the group recorded 25–30 commercials each week between 1958 and 1967. Their clients were as varied as the companies, organizations, and individuals who advertise on television and radio, such as food manufacturers, home goods companies, cigarette companies, department stores, politicians, appliance makers, and industry associations. Examples of well-known brands for which they recorded jingles include Campbell's, Marlboro, Schlitz, Sears, Pillsbury, Alka-Seltzer, Wrigley, Amana, Mr. Clean, Green Giant, and Kellogg's.

In 1963, they recorded a song, "Hey, Look Him Over!" for Birch Bayh's Senatorial campaign against incumbent Homer Capehart. The song, telling voters how to pronounce Bayh's name, ran extensively in commercials in the weeks leading up to the election, and was credited in part with Bayh's victory. The commercial went on to win a Clio Award.

A July 1964 Time article reported that they were earning $250,000 per year for their work, and that even Broadway producers interested to hire Jamie learned that she was out of their price range. Jamie and Joe declined invitations to go on tour, opting to stay in Chicago with their two daughters, Jana and Risa. Their primary activity was always commercial, but they did record three albums for Columbia Records, including both original songs and covers of standards and show tunes.

Despite not concentrating on recording albums, The J's with Jamie received two Grammy Awards nominations at the 1964 ceremony. Their album Hey, Look Us Over! earned a nomination for Best Performance by a Vocal Group, losing to Peter, Paul and Mary (for "Blowin' in the Wind"), and they were in the running for Best New Artist, which was won by The Swingle Singers. A single from the album, "Yoshiko," earned some international attention, even reaching the #1 on the Radio Malaysia chart in 1964.

In 1966 and 1967, the Silvias released two more albums on ABC Records as Jamie and the J. Silvia Singers, retaining their familiar style. The J's with Jamie formally disbanded in 1967, when the couple moved to New York City to found a commercial production house. Shelton and Dresslar remained in Chicago, teaming up with Bonnie Herman and Shelton's bandmate from The Hi-Lo's, Gene Puerling, to form another successful commercial music group, The Singers Unlimited.

== Reception and legacy ==
The J's with Jamie are best known for their work in marketing. A Time article about them titled "Oratorios for industry" called them "the best commercial-single ensemble [in which] all four singers deliver their words with the sort of enunciation that makes poets out of admen." Among other recognition for their work in advertising, they received a Clio Award for a political commercial in 1963.

They also received a positive reception for the musical quality of their popular music work. In the 1962 Billboard Artist Popularity Poll, they were ranked 5th in the "Most Promising Vocal Group" category. They received two Grammy Award nominations in 1964 following the release of Hey, Look Us Over! A Variety review of that album noted that The J's with Jamie sound young and "sprightly," but show a wide range of genres and "professional efficiency." In their review, Billboard said the group was "the best thing to come around since The Modernaires" and remarked on their "matchless vocal quality and attention to detail." Music journalist Marc Myers described Jamie's voice as "lovely and special [with] an upbeat warmth and polished perfection to her intonation that came with a girl-next-door naturalism reminiscent of Eydie Gorme."

Despite being Grammy-nominated and being among the most prominent vocal performers on the radio in the United States in the 1960s, little is known about the group. In 1964 Time Magazine wrote that "they have probably been heard by more people more times than any other group in the history of sound. Yet next to nobody knows who they are. They are the world's most successful singers of TV commercials." A WFMU blog noted that although the Columbia records are long out of print, bootlegs in Japan have had a "substantial" influence on J-pop.

== Discography ==
For most of their recording career, the group worked with Columbia Records, which released three LPs, several singles, and promotional albums. In the late 1960s, as Jamie and the J. Silvia Singers, they issued two more LPs with ABC.

=== As The J's with Jamie ===
Albums

- Hey, Look us Over! (Columbia, 1963, CL-2005/CS-8805)
- The Remarkable J's with Jamie (Columbia, 1964, CL-2149/CS-8949)
- The Two Sides of the J's with Jamie (Columbia Special Products, 1963, XCTV-96680) – not released commercially

Singles

- "Momma, Momma, Momma" /"The Sound Of Money" (1962, Columbia 4-42422)
- "One Little World Apart" / "Let's Not Be Sensible" (1962, Columbia 4-42488)
- "Laugh It Up" / "Nowhere To Go But Up" (1962, Columbia 4-42595)
- "Little Me" / "Come On Strong" (1962, Columbia 4-42635)
- "Your Dog" / "For The Last Time" (1963, Columbia 4-42855)
- "Here's Love" / "Au Revoir" (1963, Columbia 4-42903)
- "This Old House" / "London (Is A Little Bit All Right)" (1963, Columbia 4-42939)
- "Yoshiko" / "Everybody Says Don't" (1964, Columbia 4-43017)
- "Theme From 'A Summer Place'" / "Popsicles In Paris" (1964, Columbia 4-43068)

EP's:

- The J's With Jamie (1963, Columbia JZSP 75720/75699) (Note: Jacket has text: "Special presentation record to the Music Operators of America, Inc. 11th annual convention from the J's with Jamie and Columbia Records.")
- Seasons Greetings (1963, Columbia ZCTV-94306/94307)

=== As Jamie and the J. Silvia Singers ===
Albums

- Jamie and the J. Silvia Singers (ABC, 1966, LP, ABC-562/ABCS-562)
- Encore (ABC, 1967, LP, ABCS-592)

Singles

- "It's Not Unusual" / "It Was A Lover And His Lass" (1966, ABC 45–10867)
