= Grammy Award for Best Vocal Arrangement for Two or More Voices =

Music award category

- Awarded for: Musical arrangement for voice
- Country: United States
- Presented by: National Academy of Recording Arts and Sciences
- First award: 1977
- Final award: 1986
- Website: grammy.com

The Grammy Award for Best Vocal Arrangement for Two or More Voices was awarded from 1977 to 1986. From 1977 to 1981 it was called the Grammy Award for Best Arrangement for Voices. The award is presented to the arranger of the music.

Years reflect the year in which the Grammy Awards were presented, for works released in the previous year.

== Winners and nominees ==
Year	Winner(s)	Title	Nominees	Ref.
1977	Starland Vocal Band	Afternoon Delight	Quire for "Ain't Misbehavin'"; Queen for Bohemian Rhapsody; Earth, Wind & Fire for Can't Hide Love; Singers Unlimited for I Get Along Without You Very Well	
1978	Eagles	New Kid in Town	Heatwave for All You Do is Dial; Seals and Crofts for Baby I'll Give It to You; Fleetwood Mac for Go Your Own Way; Quincy Jones for O Lord, Come by Here	
1979	Bee Gees	Stayin' Alive	Singers Unlimited for Cry Me a River; Vocal Jazz Inc. for High Clouds; McCoy Tyner for Rotunda; Quincy Jones for Stuff Like That	
1980	No Award Given			
1981	Janis Siegel	Birdland by The Manhattan Transfer	Ambrosia for Biggest Part of Me; George Benson for Give Me the Night; Singers Unlimited for Sweet Georgia Brown; The Manhattan Transfer for Twilight Zone/Twilight Tone	
1982	Gene Puerling	A Nightingale Sang in Berkeley Square by The Manhattan Transfer	Milcho Leviev for (The World of) Confirmation by The Manhattan Transfer; Clare Fischer for 2 + 2 (Du, Du); Bernard Kafka, Jay Graydon for Kafka by The Manhattan Transfer; Gene Puerling for The Night We Called It a Day by The Hi-Lo's	
1983	David Paich	Rosanna by Toto	Singers Unlimited for Lullaby of Birdland; In a Dream for One Night; The Manhattan Transfer for Route 66; Donald Fagen for Ruby Baby	
1984	Arif Mardin, Chaka Khan	Be Bop Medley by Chaka Khan	The Manhattan Transfer for Code of Ethics; The Manhattan Transfer for Down South Camp Meetin'; Rare Silk for Red Clay; The Manhattan Transfer for The Night That Monk Returned to Heaven	
1985	Anita Pointer, June Pointer, Ruth Pointer	Automatic by The Pointer Sisters	Chicago for Hard Habit to Break; The Bobs for Helter Skelter; Yes for Leave It; Kenny Rogers, Kim Carnes, James Ingram for What About Me?	
1986	Bobby McFerrin, Cheryl Bentyne	Another Night in Tunisia by The Manhattan Transfer	The Manhattan Transfer for Blee Blop Blues; Phil Mattson, P.M. Singers for I Hear Music; Commodores for Nightshift; The Manhattan Transfer for Ray's Rockhouse	
