= This Time It's Love (The Hi-Lo's album) =

Studio album by The Hi-Lo's
- Released: 1962
- Genre: Jazz, traditional pop
- Length: 35 m
- Label: Columbia; CL 1723 / CS 8523
- Producer: Irving Townsend

Hi-Lo's chronology
Dancez; Avec; The Hi-Lo's (1961)	This Time It's Love (1962)	The Hi-Lo's; Happen to Folk Music (1962)

This Time It's Love is an album made by the American vocal group, The Hi-Lo's, with an orchestral accompaniment arranged and conducted by Clare Fischer, recorded and released on the Columbia label in 1962 as CL 1723 (mono)/CS 8523 (stereo).

== Reception ==
Described as "[t]he last solid Hi-Lo's LP before the quartet folded in 1964," This Time It's Love was awarded three stars by John Bush in his Allmusic review, which goes on to note:

Professional ratings
Review scores
Source	Rating
Allmusic	3/5 stars
Billboard	4/5 stars
Disc	4/5 stars

External audio
- You may listen to "On the Alamo" here

This Time It's Love was a ballads-only album, and thus much less snappy and swinging than previous records like the Marty Paich extravaganza And All That Jazz or the Rosemary Clooney collaboration Ring Around Rosie. The gauzy harmonies of the Hi-Lo's were perfectly suited to slow-dance material, though, and the selections are perfect, arranged by Hi-Lo's associate Clare Fischer (who often played piano with the quartet).

Contemporary reviews were even more flattering, with 4-star reviews issued by Billboard and Disc; the former finding the singing, "as always, top drawer, imaginative, fresh and done with great skill," while the latter credits Fischer with "maintain[ing] a soft, subtle Latin mood throughout [and] matching the group's unique approach well with his original scores." In addition, American Record Guide offers its "recommend[ation] with glowing acclaim," describing the Hi-Lo's as one of the "most compelling, most ingratiating, most musically sharp" groups of its kind.

== Track listing ==
All compositions arranged by Clare Fischer.

1. "My Foolish Heart" (Victor Young, Ned Washington)
2. "More Than You Know" (Vincent Youmans, Billy Rose, Edward Eliscu)
3. "The Second Time Around" (Jimmy Van Heusen, Sammy Cahn)
4. "Bésame Mucho" (Consuelo Velázquez, Sunny Skylar)
5. "Only Forever" (James V. Monaco, Johnny Burke)
6. "Let Me Love You" (Bart Howard)
7. "Catch a Falling Star" (Paul Vance, Lee Pockriss)
8. "There's a Small Hotel" (Richard Rodgers, Lorenz Hart)
9. "The Very Thought of You" (Ray Noble)
10. "Tangerine" (Victor Schertzinger, Ray Noble)
11. "On the Alamo" (Isham Jones, Gus Kahn)
12. "Paradise" (Nacio Herb Brown, Gordon Clifford)

== Personnel ==
- Clark Burroughs – tenor,
- Don Shelton – tenor
- Bob Morse – baritone
- Gene Puerling – bass/baritone, vocal arranger
- Clare Fischer – arranger, conductor
