= This Time It's Love =

This Time It's Love may refer to:

- This Time It's Love (Kurt Elling album)
- This Time It's Love (The Hi-Lo's album)
