= Now Hear This (The Hi-Lo's album) =

Studio album by The Hi-Lo's
- Released: 1957
- Genre: Traditional pop, show tunes
- Label: Columbia

The Hi-Lo's chronology
Ring Around Rosie (with Rosemary Clooney) (1957)	Now Hear This (1957)	The Hi-Lo's and the Jerry Fielding Orchestra (1957)

Now Hear This was an LP album by The Hi-Lo's released in 1957 by Columbia Records, as catalog number CL-1023.

== Track listing ==
Track number	Song	Songwriter(s)
1	Sunnyside Up	B.G. DeSylva/Lew Brown/Ray Henderson
2	Laura	David Raksin/Johnny Mercer
3	A Shine on Your Shoes	Arthur Schwartz/Howard Dietz
4	The Heather on the Hill	Alan Jay Lerner/Frederick Loewe
5	There's No You	Tom Adair/Hal Hopper
6	Camptown Races	Stephen Foster
7	Two Ladies in de Shade of de Banana Tree	Harold Arlen/Truman Capote
8	Little Girl Blue	Richard Rodgers/Lorenz Hart
9	The Brown-Skin Gal (in the Calico Gown)	Duke Ellington/Paul Francis Webster
10	My Time Is Your Time	Leo Dance/Eric Little
11	A Quiet Girl	Leonard Bernstein/Betty Comden/Adolph Green
12	My Melancholy Baby	Ernie Burnett/George A. Norton

It was combined with the Hi-Lo's 1960 album, Broadway Playbill, into a compact disc released by Collectables Records on October 17, 2000.
