= Jason Pearce (disambiguation) =

Jason Pearce is an English footballer.

Jason Pearce may also refer to:

- Jason Pearce, member of US Christian music group, Rescue (a cappella group)
- Jason Pearce (pole vaulter), Athletics at the 1999 Pan American Games

== See also ==
- Jason Pierce, English musician
- Jason Pierce (drummer), Canadian drummer
