= Coquette (song) =

Song performed by Guy Lombardo

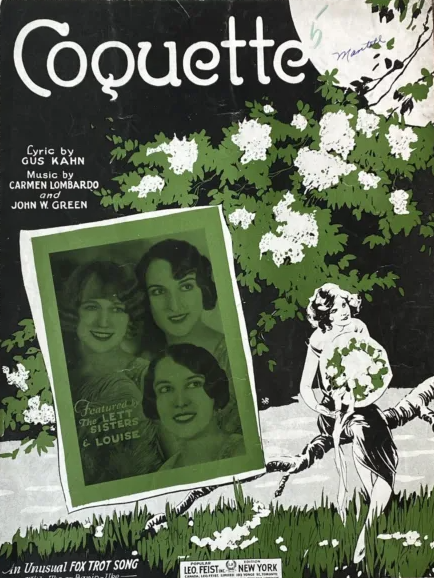
Sheet music cover featuring the Lett Sisters, 1928

"Coquette" is a 1928 fox trot jazz standard. It was composed by Johnny Green and Carmen Lombardo, with lyrics by Gus Kahn. Guy Lombardo had great success with the song in 1928.

== Film appearance ==
- Cockeyed Cavaliers (1934)

== Notable recordings ==
- Guy Lombardo & his Royal Canadians (vocal Carmen Lombardo) recorded on March 21, 1928, and released on Columbia 1345-D.
- Paul Whiteman & his Orchestra (recorded on March 2, 1928, and released on Victor 21301.
- The Dorsey Brothers Orchestra recorded on March 14, 1928 and released on Okeh 41007
- The Ink Spots - recorded August 17, 1939 and released on Decca 3077.
- Louis Armstrong - recorded April 17, 1942 and released on Decca 4327.
- Django Reinhardt with Stéphane Grappelli (1946)
- Frankie Laine (1947)
- Billy Eckstine recorded for MGM Records in 1953 and released on MGM 11439. This version briefly reached the Billboard charts at No. 26.
- The Hi-Lo's included in the Rosemary Clooney album Ring Around Rosie (1957)
- Johnnie Ray for his live album Johnnie Ray In Las Vegas (1957)
- Fats Domino 1958 (Imperial Records X 5553), as the B-side to Whole Lotta Lovin', and on the 1961 What A Party! album (Imperial Records LP 9164)
- Paul McCartney included in the album Run Devil Run (1999)

== See also ==
- List of jazz standards
