= Broadway Playbill =

Studio album by The Hi-Lo's
- Released: 1960
- Genre: Show tunes
- Label: Columbia

The Hi-Lo's chronology
Sing Along with The Hi-Lo's (1960)	Broadway Playbill (1960)	All Over the Place (1960)

Broadway Playbill was a 1960 LP album by American vocal group The Hi-Lo's containing songs from three Broadway musicals: Gypsy, The Sound of Music, and Fiorello!. The album was released by Columbia Records as catalog number CL-1416 (in monaural) and CS-8213 (in stereo).

Broadway Playbill was combined with the Hi-Lo's 1957 album Now Hear This into a compact disc released by Collectables Records on October 17, 2000.

== Track listing ==
Track number	Song	Songwriter(s)
1	Overture	Jule Styne/Stephen Sondheim
2	Everything's Coming Up Roses	Jule Styne/Stephen Sondheim
3	Small World	Jule Styne/Stephen Sondheim
4	Together Wherever We Go	Jule Styne/Stephen Sondheim
6	Little Lamb	Jule Styne/Stephen Sondheim
7	Mr. Goldstone, I Love You	Jule Styne/Stephen Sondheim
8	My Favorite Things	Richard Rodgers/Oscar Hammerstein II
9	The Sound of Music	Richard Rodgers/Oscar Hammerstein II
10	Climb Ev'ry Mountain	Richard Rodgers/Oscar Hammerstein II
11	Gentleman Jimmy	Jerry Bock/Sheldon M. Harnick
12	When Did I Fall In Love?	Jerry Bock/Sheldon M. Harnick
13	Politics and Poker	Jerry Bock/Sheldon M. Harnick
