= Gene Puerling =

American vocal performer and arranger

- Gene Puerling, circa early 1970's

Background information
- Born: Eugene Thomas Puerling; March 31, 1929; Milwaukee, Wisconsin, U.S.
- Origin: Milwaukee, Wisconsin, U.S.
- Died: March 25, 2008 (aged 78) San Anselmo, California
- Genres: Jazz; Pop
- Occupations: Musician; composer; vocal arranger; orchestrator
- Instruments: Voice; Piano
- Years active: 1949–2008
- Labels: Columbia; MPS; Reprise; Pausa

Eugene Thomas Puerling (March 31, 1929 – March 25, 2008) was an American vocal performer and arranger. Puerling created and led two prominent vocal quartets, The Hi-Lo's and The Singers Unlimited. He was nominated for 14 Grammys and awarded the Grammy Award for Best Vocal Arrangement for Two or More Voices in 1982.

== Early life, musical education and influences ==
Born in Milwaukee in 1929 to a family of musicians, Puerling had piano lessons but was a largely self-taught musician. A fan of vocal groups like Mel Torme's The Mel-Tones, the Modernaires and the Four Freshmen, Puerling formed a vocal of his own during this time (The Shades), featuring baritone Bob Strasen who would become one of the original Hi-Lo's. After high school Puerling worked as a disc jockey in Milwaukee WI.

== Move to Los Angeles, The Hi-Lo's ==
Moving to Los Angeles in 1950, Puerling got his start by singing on recordings of Les Baxter and Gordon Jenkins. Bandleader and film composer Jerry Fielding encouraged Puerling to arrange for voices and start his own group. Formed in 1952, Puerling's male vocal quartet (The Hi-Lo's) began recording for the small Starlite label in 1953 (became Trend Records and then Trend/Discovery). Fielding's orchestra backed the Hi-Lo's on the first singles Peg O' My Heart and They Didn't Believe Me. The combination of Puerling's vocal quartet arrangements combined with Fielding instrumentals were innovative, a departure from earlier "block", pop style writing and arranging done for groups like the Andrews Sisters or the Modernaires.

=== Television and Rosemary Clooney ===
Gene Puerling's biggest break came as a writer and arranger in 1956; The Hi-Lo's were featured for one season on a new weekly, half-hour syndicated television musical-variety production The Rosemary Clooney Show. Puerling collaborated with Nelson Riddle who was hired as the musical director and orchestra conductor for the T.V. show. The show only lasted a year which featured The Hi-Lo's singing group and Nelson Riddle's orchestra before moving to NBC as The Lux Show with Frank DeVol and the Modernaires supplying the music. Due to their new national notoriety, during 1956/57 the vocal group was also signed to Columbia Records.

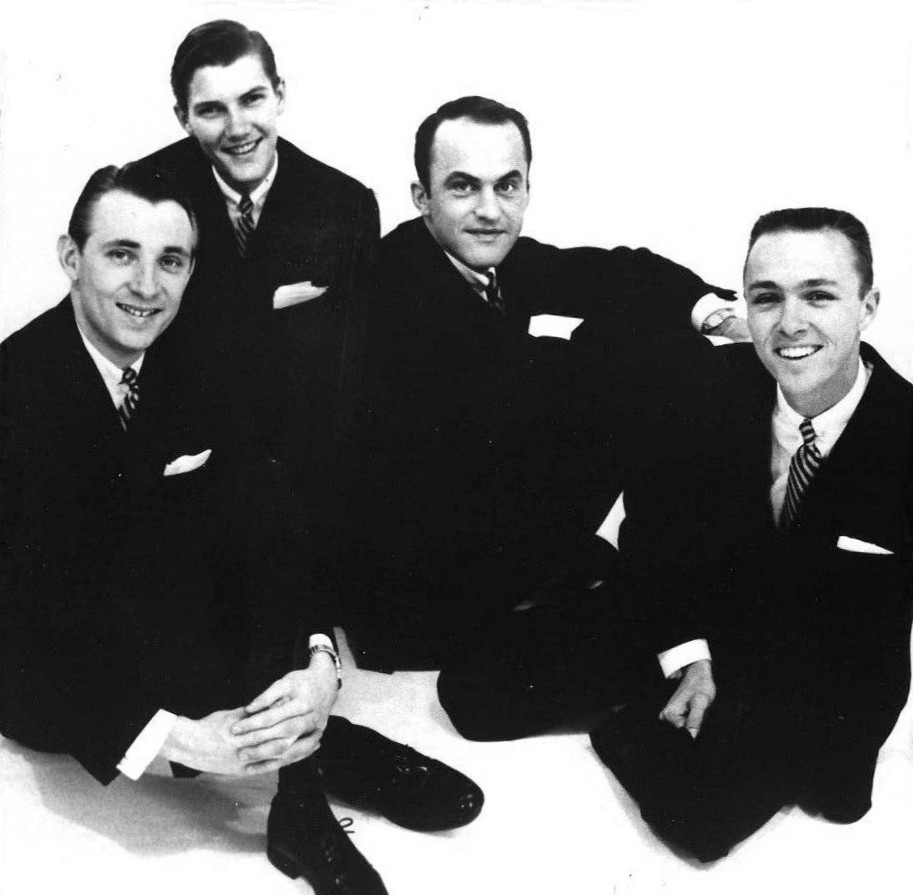
The Hi-Lo's 1957, Gene Puerling on far left

During late 1950's and early 1960's, the Hi-Lo's appeared on television with Frank Sinatra, Benny Goodman and other stars and toured with Judy Garland. Puerling wrote and arranged for the Hi-Los releasing numerous singles and several albums for the Columbia label 1956 thru 1961; his collaboration with Les Brown's staff arranger Frank Comstock are most notable. Columbia discontinued the contract with the group and in 1962 the Hi-Lo's were signed to Sinatra's new Reprise record label. Puerling's vocal arrangements are featured on two Reprise releases of American folk songs and bossa nova music. His vocal arrangements can also be heard on commercial television advertisements during this time for Hertz Rent a Car, Muriel Cigars and other companies. The popularity and advent of rock 'n' roll hastened the Hi-Lo's split in late 1964; like other older, traditional vocal groups they had fallen out of vogue as a commercial entity. By that time, groups like The Beach Boys and The Beatles with much simpler vocal harmonies appealed to a younger generation of pop listeners.

== Chicago, The Singers Unlimited ==
After the break up of the Hi-Los in 1964, Puerling moved to Chicago writing music for major advertisement firms. Puerling formed The Singers Unlimited in 1967 as a vocal group to sing and record his commercial writing for advertisement soundtracks. From this period on, Puerling would rarely perform live, focusing his attention on innovative studio arranging for voices and vocal groups; namely The Singers Unlimited. Other than Puerling singing himself, three other singers are heard on the vast majority of his vocal writing: Bonnie Herman, Don Shelton and Len Dressler. Shelton had been brought over from the Hi-Lo's. Herman had established herself as a first-call female, Chicago studio vocalist and can be heard on the State Farm Insurance jingle "Like a good Neighbor..." (composed by Barry Manilow). Dressler was another Chicago studio vocalist most known for his deep bass voice and heard on the Green Giant "Ho, ho, ho..." advertising campaign.

By 1968 recording engineer and jazz enthusiast Hans Georg Brunner-Schwer founded MPS Records in Baden-Württemberg, Germany. He had signed pianist Oscar Peterson to the label and eventually Peterson was Puerling's/The Singers Unlimited referral to Brunner-Schwer. Starting with the album a Capella in 1971, Puerling and the Singers Unlimited recorded 15 albums at MPS up through the early 1980's. Puerling would go on to earn 18 Grammy nominations for writing and arranging, primarily driven by his work with Singers Unlimited. His vocal arrangement for the Manhattan Transfer Mecca for Moderns album of A Nightingale Sang in Berkeley Square won the 1982 Grammy for Best Vocal Arrangement for Two or More Voices.

=== Multi-tracked vocals, recording innovation ===
With the advent of stereo recording and high level solid state technology, Puerling developed a whole new style of writing and arranging for multi voices. Much like experimentation happening with the Beach Boys or the Beatles and other pop groups of the time, he utilized new, multiple tracking methods to double/triple up the Singers Unlimited four voices creating a unique, homogeneous sound. His vocal arrangements and chord structures are instantly recognizable due to the experimentation he undertook over a 10 year period (through the 1970s). Collaborations with instrumental arrangers/groups were done separately. All Singers Unlimited vocal tracks were recorded in Germany by Brunner-Schwer while instrumental tracks are recorded in Los Angeles or Toronto; Puerling and the group are only known to have performed live once.

== Later life ==
Eventually Puerling moved to San Anselmo in Northern California. In the late 1970s, Puerling reunited the Hi-Lo's, with whom he recorded and also performed at the Monterey Jazz Festival other jazz venues around the country. He taught workshops at the Marin County-based Harmony Sweepstakes. Gene Puerling died on March 25, 2008, due to complications from diabetes at 78 years of age near his home in Marin County, California. He was survived by his wife, Helen.

== Legacy ==
In addition to the Hi-Lo's and The Singers Unlimited, Puerling has influenced many singers and groups, including Jacob Collier, Take 6, The King's Singers, First Call, Chanticleer, Glad (band), The Free Design, and Brian Wilson. John Neal of Harmony Sweepstakes said after Puerling's death: "As a craftsman of the art of blending and harmonizing the human voice in song, Gene has no equal." In fall 2014, The University of North Texas College of Music and Music Library acquired the library of arrangements from Gene Puerling's estate.

== Works (partial list) ==
Vocal Jazz Arrangements by Gene Puerling (a partial list)
Song title	Songwriter(s)	Arranged for...	Album Premiere	Sheet Music Publisher	Sheet Music Anthology
A Child Is Born	Thad Jones	The Singers Unlimited with Oscar Peterson	In Tune (1973)		
A Foggy Day (In London Town)	Gershwin	Glad	A Cappella Gershwin (1995)		
A Nightingale Sang in Berkeley Square	Manning Sherwin	Manhattan Transfer	Mecca For Moderns (1981)	Hal Leonard	
All The Things You Are	Jerome Kern / Oscar Hammerstein	The Singers Unlimited	A Capella III		
A Time For Love		The Singers Unlimited & The Pat Williams Orchestra	Feeling Free (1975)		
Am I Blue	Grant Clark, Harry Akst				The Gene Puerling Sound
Angel Eyes		The Singers Unlimited	Sentimental Journey (1976)		
Anything Goes	Cole Porter	The Singers Unlimited	A Capella III		
April In Paris	E. Y. Harburg, Vernon Duke	The Singers Unlimited	A Capella II (1975)	Shawnee Press	The Gene Puerling Sound
As Time Goes By		The Singers Unlimited	Sentimental Journey (1976)		
Autumn In New York	Vernon Duke	The Singers Unlimited	A Capella II (1975)	Shawnee Press	The Gene Puerling Sound
Both Sides Now	Joni Mitchell	The Singers Unlimited	A Capella (1972)		
Brahms' Lullaby	Johannes Brahms	Cantabile - The London Quartet	Madrigal to McCartney		
Breathe on Me, Breath of God		Acoustix	O Worship The King		
But Beautiful		The Singers Unlimited (with...)	Invitation (1974)		
But Not for Me	Gershwin	Glad	A Cappella Gershwin (1995)		
Button Up Your Overcoat				CPP Belwin	The Best of Gene Puerling
Catherine	Patrick Williams	The Singers Unlimited with Oscar Peterson	In Tune (1973)		
Cherry		The Singers Unlimited (with...)	Invitation (1974)		
Children's Game	Billy Blanco, Antonio Carlos Jobim	The Singers Unlimited with Oscar Peterson	In Tune (1973)		
Clair	Gilbert O' Sullivan	The Singers Unlimited	A Capella II (1975)		
Dancing in the Dark	Howard Dietz, Arthur Schwartz			Shawnee Press	The Gene Puerling Sound
Deck The Hall	Traditional Welsh Carol	The Singers Unlimited	Christmas (1972)	Shawnee Press	
Deep Purple		The Singers Unlimited	Sentimental Journey (1976)		
Du Ar Det Vackra Jag Ser I Mitt Liv		Real Group	Varfor Far Man Inte Bara Vara Som Man Ar?		
Ectasy		The Singers Unlimited (with...)	Invitation (1974)		
Embraceable You		Glad	A Cappella Gershwin (1995)		
Emily	Johnny Mercer	The Singers Unlimited	A Capella (1972)	Shawnee Press	The Sound of The Singers Unlimited
Fairest Lord Jesus	Trad. Hymn	Glad	Acapella Hymns		
Feeling Free With Patrick B		The Singers Unlimited & The Pat Williams Orchestra	Feeling Free (1975)		
Foreign Affair	Tom Waits	The Manhattan Transfer	Extensions (The Manhattan Transfer album)	Unpublished	
Georgia On My Mind	Hoagy Carmichael	Hi-Lo's		CPP Belwin	The Best of Gene Puerling
Girl Talk	Bobby Troup	The Singers Unlimited	A Capella II (1975)		
Green Dolphin Street		The Singers Unlimited & The Pat Williams Orchestra	Feeling Free (1975)		
Have Yourself a Merry Little Christmas		The Singers Unlimited	Christmas (1972)		
Here, There And Everywhere	Lennon / McCartney	The Singers Unlimited	A Capella (1972)	Shawnee Press	
Here's That Rainy Day	Johnny Burke, Jimmy Van Heusen	The Singers Unlimited with Oscar Peterson	In Tune (1973)		
How Beautiful is Night		The Singers Unlimited	Sentimental Journey (1976)		
I Don't Know Where I Stand	Joni Mitchell	The Singers Unlimited	A Capella II (1975)		
I Get Along Without You Very Well		The Singers Unlimited	Sentimental Journey (1976)		
I Wish You Love	Charles Trenet	The Singers Unlimited	A Capella III		
I'll Never Smile Again		Gold Company	25		
I'll Remember April		The Singers Unlimited	Sentimental Journey (1976)		
I'm Shadowing You		The Singers Unlimited & The Pat Williams Orchestra	Feeling Free (1975)		
If		The Singers Unlimited	Four of Us (1973)		
If I Didn't Care		The Singers Unlimited	Sentimental Journey (1976)		
In the Still of the Night		The Singers Unlimited	Sentimental Journey (1976)		
Indian Summer	Al Dubin, Victor Herbert	The Singers Unlimited	A Capella II (1975)	Shawnee Press	The Gene Puerling Sound
Invitation		The Singers Unlimited (with...)	Invitation (1974)		
It Came Upon a Midnight Clear		The Singers Unlimited	Christmas (1972)		
It Could Happen to You		The Singers Unlimited	Four of Us (1973)		
It Never Entered My Mind	Lorenz Hart, Richard Rodgers	The Singers Unlimited with Oscar Peterson	In Tune (1973)		
Ja Da		The Singers Unlimited & The Pat Williams Orchestra	Feeling Free (1975)		
Jeanie With The Light Brown Hair	Stephen Foster	The Singers Unlimited	A Capella III		Chanticleer Silver Jubilee Anthology (pub. Hinshaw Music)
Jennifer's Rabbit		The Singers Unlimited	Four of Us (1973)		
Johnny One Note		P.M. Singers	Jubilee		
Just In Time		Soundsation	Sugar & Spice		
Killing Me Softly with His Song	Fox / Gimball	The Singers Unlimited	A Capella II (1975)		
Let There Be Love		The Singers Unlimited (with...)	Invitation (1974)		
Like Someone In Love	Van Huesen / Burke	The Singers Unlimited	A Capella II 1975)		
London By Night	Carol Coates	The Singers Unlimited	A Capella (1972)		
Look Around		The Singers Unlimited	Four of Us (1973)		
Lost In The Stars	Kurt Weill	The Singers Unlimited	A Capella II (1975)		Chanticleer Silver Jubilee Anthology (pub. Hinshaw Music)
Love Is Here To Stay	George & Ira Gershwin	The Singers Unlimited	A Capella III		
Love Walked In		Chanticleer	Our American Journey		
Lullaby	Gene Puerling	The Singers Unlimited	The Complete A Cappella Sessions	A Capella (1972)	
Michelle	Lennon / McCartney	The Singers Unlimited	A Capella (1972)	Shawnee Press	
Mona Lisa		The Singers Unlimited	Sentimental Journey (1976)		
More I Cannot Wish You	Frank Loesser	The Singers Unlimited	A Capella (1972)		
My One and Only Love		The Singers Unlimited (with...)	Invitation (1974)		
My Romance	Richard Rodgers / Lorenz Hart	The Singers Unlimited	A Capella II (1972)		
My Ship		The Singers Unlimited	Four of Us (1973)	Shawnee Press	The Sound of The Singers Unlimited
Nature Boy	Eden Ahbez	The Singers Unlimited	A Capella II (1972)		
On a Clear Day		The Singers Unlimited & The Pat Williams Orchestra	Feeling Free (1975)	Shawnee Press	The Sound of The Singers Unlimited
Once Upon a Summertime	Eddie Barclay, Michel Legrand, Eddy Marnay, Johnny Mercer	The Singers Unlimited with Oscar Peterson	In Tune (1973)		
One More Time Chuck Corea	Gene Puerling	The Singers Unlimited	A Capella III		
Over the Rainbow				Alfred	
Put Your Dreams Away for Another Day		The Singers Unlimited	Sentimental Journey (1976)		
Rockin' Chair				CPP Belwin	The Best of Gene Puerling
Sentimental Journey		The Singers Unlimited	Sentimental Journey (1976)		
Sesame Street		The Singers Unlimited with Oscar Peterson	In Tune (1973)		
Silent Night	Franz Xaver Gruber	The Singers Unlimited	Christmas (1972)	Shawnee Press	
Since You Asked	Judy Collins	The Singers Unlimited	The Complete A Cappella Sessions	A Capella (1972)	
Skylark		The Singers Unlimited & The Pat Williams Orchestra	Feeling Free (1975)		
Sleepy Time Gal		The Singers Unlimited	Sentimental Journey (1976)		
Snowfall	G. Thornhill	The Singers Unlimited	Four of Us (1973)	Shawnee Press	
So Many Stars		The Singers Unlimited & The Pat Williams Orchestra	Feeling Free (1975)		
Someone To Light Up My Life	Jobin	The Singers Unlimited	A Capella III		
Sometimes I Feel Like A Motherless Child	Traditional	The Singers Unlimited	A Capella III		
Soon It's Gonna Rain		The Singers Unlimited	Four of Us (1973)		
Spring Is Here		The Singers Unlimited (with...)	Invitation (1974)		
Stardust	Hoagy Carmicheal	Vocal Majority	I'll Be Seeing You		
Sweet Lorraine	Burwell / Parish	The Singers Unlimited	A Capella III		
Swing Low, Sweet Chariot		Acoustix	O Worship The King		
The Christmas Song	Mel Torme / Robert Wells	Notre Dame Glee Club	In Dulci Jubilo		
The Christmas Song	Mel Torme / Robert Wells	Singers Unlimited? Voice Trek? Chanticleer?	The Spirit Of Christmas	Hal Leonard	
The Entertainer	Scott Joplin	The Singers Unlimited	A Capella III		
The Fool On The Hill	Lennon / McCartney	The Singers Unlimited	A Capella (1972)	Hal Leonard	
The Gentle Rain	Luiz Bonfá, Matt Dubey	The Singers Unlimited with Oscar Peterson	In Tune (1973)		
The More I See You		The Singers Unlimited	Sentimental Journey (1976)		
The Shadow of Your Smile	Johnny Mandel, Paul Francis Webster	The Singers Unlimited with Oscar Peterson	In Tune (!973)	CPP Belwin	The Best of Gene Puerling
The Way We Were	Marvin Hamlisch	The Singers Unlimited	A Capella III		
Through The Years		Ambassadors of Harmony	Applause		
Try To Remember	Tom Jones / Harvey Schmidt	The Singers Unlimited	A Capella (1972)	Shawnee Press	The Sound of The Singers Unlimited
Unforgettable		Acoustix	All The Best		
Unforgettable		Acoustix	Jazz, Jazz, Jazz		
Violets for Your Furs		The Singers Unlimited (with...)	Invitation (1974)		
Wave		The Singers Unlimited (with...)	Invitation (1974)		
We Could Be Flying		The Singers Unlimited (with...)	Invitation (1974)		
We've Only Just Begun	Roger Nichols	The Singers Unlimited	Four of Us (1973)	Shawnee Press	The Sound of The Singers Unlimited
What Are You Doing for the Rest of Your Life?		Real Group	Get Real (1997) & Unreal (2006)		
Where Is Love?		The Singers Unlimited	Four of Us (1973)	Shawnee Press	The Sound of The Singers Unlimited
Where Is the Love		The Singers Unlimited & The Pat Williams Orchestra	Feeling Free (1975)		
While We're Young	Wilder / Palitz	Gold Company	While We're Young		
Yesterday	Lennon / McCartney	The Singers Unlimited	A Capella II (1975)	Shawnee Press	
You Are the Sunshine of My Life		The Singers Unlimited & The Pat Williams Orchestra	Feeling Free (1975)		
You Made Me Love You	James V. Monaco	Beachfront Property	Beachfront Property		
You've Got a Friend		The Singers Unlimited	Four of Us (1973)		

== Discography (as arranger) ==
Discography (as arranger)
Album Title	Label	Release Year	Performers
Listen!	Starlite	1954	The Hi-Lo's
I Presume	Starlite	1955	The Hi-Lo's
On Hand	Starlite	1956	The Hi-Lo's
Under Glass	Starlite	1956	The Hi-Lo's
The Hi-Lo's And The Jerry Fielding Orchestra	Kapp Records	1956	The Hi-Lo's And The Jerry Fielding Orchestra
Ring Around Rosie	Columbia	1957	Rosemary Clooney And The Hi-Lo's
Now Hear This	Columbia	1957	The Hi-Lo's With Frank Comstock
Suddenly It's The Hi-Lo's	Columbia	1957	The Hi-Lo's With The Frank Comstock Orchestra
Under Glass	London Records	1957	The Hi-Lo's, Frank Comstock And His Orchestra
Love Nest	Columbia	1958	The Hi-Lo's with Frank Comstock And His Orchestra
And All That Jazz	Columbia	1958	The Hi-Lo's With The Marty Paich Dek-Tette
Reflections in Rhythm with The Hi-Lo's!	Tiara Spotlight Series	1958	The Hi-Lo's
The Hi-Lo's In Stereo	Omega Disk	1959	The Hi-Lo's With The Frank Comstock Orchestra
Broadway Playbill	Columbia	1960	The Hi-Lo's
All Over The Place	Columbia	1960	The Hi-Lo's
This Time It's Love	Columbia	1961	The Hi-Lo's
The Hi-Lo's Happen To Folk Songs	Reprise Records	1962	The Hi-Lo's With Billy May And His Orchestra
The Hi-Lo's Happen To Bossa Nova	Reprise Records	1963	The Hi-Lo's
Back Again	MPS Records	1979	The Hi-Lo's
Now	Pausa Records	1981	The Hi-Lo's
Cherries And Other Delights	Hindsight Jazz	1993	The Hi-Lo's
Christmas	MPS Records, BASF	1972	The Singers Unlimited
A Capella	MPS Records, BASF	1972	The Singers Unlimited
Four Of Us	MPS Records, BASF	1973	The Singers Unlimited
In Tune	BASF, MPS Records	1973	The Oscar Peterson Trio + The Singers Unlimited
Invitation	MPS Records, BASF	1974	Art Van Damme & The Singers Unlimited
A Capella II	MPS Records, BASF	1975	The Singers Unlimited
Feeling Free	MPS Records, BASF	1975	The Singers Unlimited / The Pat Williams Orchestra
Sentimental Journey	MPS Records	1976	The Singers Unlimited
A Special Blend	MPS Records, BASF	1975	The Singers Unlimited
Friends	Pausa Records	1977	The Singers Unlimited
Just In Time	Pausa Records	1978	The Singers Unlimited
Eventide	MPS Records	1978	The Singers Unlimited
The Singers Unlimited With Rob McConnell And The Boss Brass	Pausa Records	1979	The Singers Unlimited With Rob McConnell And The Boss Brass
A Capella III	MPS Records	1980	The Singers Unlimited
Easy To Love	Pausa Records	1981	The Singers Unlimited
