= Tim Storms =

American singer and composer (born 1972)

- Born: August 28, 1972 (age 54); Tulsa, Oklahoma
- Instrument: Vocals

Tim Storms (born August 28, 1972) is an American singer and composer. He holds the Guinness World Record for both the "lowest note produced by a human" and the "widest vocal range".

== Musical career ==
Born in Tulsa, Oklahoma, Storms was raised in Waterloo, Indiana. His musical affinity appeared at a young age. Four days after graduating from high school, he returned to Oklahoma to begin his career in Christian music. Since then, Storms has appeared with a number of singing groups, including Freedom, Vocal Union, AVB, Acappella, and Rescue. He also performed with the cast of Branson's "50s at the Hop", was voted Branson's Bass Singer of the Year for three years in a row, and is in the Branson's Entertainers Hall of Fame. Storms joined Pierce Arrow Theater in Branson at the beginning of the 2006 season.

As well as his performances across the United States, Storms has also performed in Brazil, France, Switzerland, Jamaica, and Fiji. In 2012, after auditioning to record with the St. Petersburg Chamber Choir in Saint Petersburg, Storms was selected by composer Paul Mealor, producer Anna Barry and Decca Records to record four songs with the choir. Two of the four songs, "De Profundis" and "The Twelve Brigands", ended up on the Universal/Decca Records release, Tranquility Voices of Deep Calm.

== Guinness World Record ==
Storms' Guinness World Record for the Lowest Note Produced by a Human is 0.189 Hz (G_{−7}), set in 2012. He has a separate record for Greatest Vocal Range by a Male, which is about 10 octaves, 0.7973–807.3 Hz (G/G♯_{−5}–G/G♯_{5}), but does not include the 2-octave extension of the low frequency record set in 2012; the Greatest Vocal Range Record of 10 octaves was set in 2008, prior to the 2012 record.
