= Ring Around Rosie =

Studio album by Rosemary Clooney
- Released: 1957
- Recorded: February 14–17, 1957
- Genre: Vocal jazz
- Length: 54:06
- Label: Columbia

Rosemary Clooney chronology
| Blue Rose (1956) | Ring Around Rosie (1957) | Oh, Captain! (1958) |

Professional ratings
Review scores
| Source | Rating |
|---|---|
| AllMusic | 3.5/5 stars |
| The Encyclopedia of Popular Music | 4/5 stars |

Ring Around Rosie is a 1957 studio album by Rosemary Clooney and the vocal group The Hi-Lo's.

== Track listing ==
1. "Don'cha Go 'Way Mad" (Illinois Jacquet, Jimmy Mundy, Al Stillman) – 2:09
2. "Moonlight Becomes You" (Johnny Burke, Jimmy Van Heusen)- The Hi-Lo's alone – 3:13
3. "Love Letters" (Edward Heyman, Victor Young) – 2:27
4. "I Could Write a Book" (Lorenz Hart, Richard Rodgers) - The Hi-Lo's alone – 2:00
5. "I'm in the Mood for Love" (Dorothy Fields, Jimmy McHugh) – 3:30
6. "Coquette" (Johnny Green, Gus Kahn, Carmen Lombardo)- The Hi-Lo's alone – 2:18
7. "Together" (Lew Brown, Buddy DeSylva, Ray Henderson) – 2:42
8. "Everything Happens to Me" (Tom Adair, Matt Dennis) – 3:27
9. "(In My) Solitude" (Eddie DeLange, Duke Ellington, Irving Mills) - The Hi-Lo's alone – 3:54
10. "What Is There to Say?" (Vernon Duke, Yip Harburg) – 3:21
11. "I'm Glad There Is You" (Tommy Dorsey, Paul Madeira) – 3:31
12. "How About You?" (Ralph Freed, Burton Lane) – 2:26

== Personnel ==
- Rosemary Clooney – vocal
- The Hi-Lo's
