= Elmer Dresslar Jr. =

American singer (1925–2005)

Elmer "Len" Dresslar Jr.
- Born: March 25, 1925
- Died: October 16, 2005 (aged 80)
- Occupation(s): Voice actor, vocalist
- Years active: 1955–2005
- Known for: Deep bass voice of the Jolly Green Giant in commercials for General Mills

Elmer "Len" Dresslar Jr. (March 25, 1925 – October 16, 2005) was an American voice actor and vocalist. He is best known as the deep bass voice of the Jolly Green Giant in commercials for General Mills.

== Early life ==
He served as a gunner's mate in the United States Navy. After serving in the navy, he moved to Chicago to study voice. While there, he gradually built up a reputation both in jazz circles (as a member of The Singers Unlimited, he recorded 15 albums) and as a voice actor. He recorded jingles and other spots for many well-known brands including Amoco, Dinty Moore, Marlboro, and Rice Krispies cereal.

== Career ==
Len Dresslar charted the hits "Chain Gang" (not to be confused with the Sam Cooke song) and "These Hands" on Mercury 70774. Prior to his 1970s stand in the Singers Unlimited, he was a member of the J's with Jamie.

== Personal life ==
After retiring from advertising, he moved to California. He died of cancer in 2005.
