= Bass (voice type) =

Type of classical male singing voice

A bass is a type of classical male singing voice and has the lowest vocal range of all voice types. According to The New Grove Dictionary of Opera, a bass is typically classified as having a vocal range extending from around the second E below middle C (82.41 Hz) to the E above middle C (329.62 Hz) (i.e., E_{2}–E_{4}). Its tessitura, or comfortable range, is normally defined by the outermost lines of the bass clef. Categories of bass voices vary according to national style and classification system.

Italians favour subdividing basses into the basso cantante ("singing bass" warm, sonorous tone, a faster vibrato, and a well-developed upper range that shares qualities with a baritone), basso buffo ("comical bass" light, agile bass or bass-baritone range), or the dramatic basso profondo ("deep bass" going down to second C below middle C (65.41 Hz / C₂) or lower with a resonant tone comparable to a large church bell or double bass). The American system identifies the bass-baritone, comic bass, lyric bass, and dramatic bass.

The German Fach system offers further distinctions: Spielbass (Bassbuffo), Schwerer Spielbass (Schwerer Bassbuffo), Charakterbass (Bassbariton), and Seriöser Bass. These classifications tend to describe roles rather than singers: it is rare for a performer to stay within a single Fach.

== History ==
Cultural influence and individual variation create a wide variation in range and quality of bass singers. Parts for basses have included notes as low as the B-flat two octaves and a tone below middle C (B♭_{1}), for example in Gustav Mahler's Symphony No. 2 and Rachmaninov's All-Night Vigil, A below that in Frederik Magle's symphonic suite Cantabile, G below that (e.g. Measure 76 of Ne otverzhi mene by Pavel Chesnokov) or F below those in Kheruvimskaya pesn (Song of Cherubim) by Krzysztof Penderecki. Many basso profondos have trouble reaching those notes, and the use of them in works by Slavic composers has led to the colloquial term "Russian bass" for an exceptionally deep-ranged basso profondo who can easily sing these notes. Some traditional Russian religious music calls for A_{2} (110 Hz) drone singing, which is doubled by A_{1} (55 Hz) in the rare occasion that a choir includes singers who can produce this very low human voice pitch.

Many British composers such as Benjamin Britten have written parts for bass (such as the first movement of his choral work Rejoice in the Lamb) that center far higher than the bass tessitura as implied by the clef. The Harvard Dictionary of Music defines the range as being from the E below low C to middle C (i.e. E_{2}–C_{4}).

== In choral music ==
In SATB four-part mixed chorus, the bass is the lowest vocal range, below the tenor, alto, and soprano. Voices are subdivided into first bass and second bass with no distinction being made between bass and baritone voices, in contrast to the three-fold (tenor–baritone–bass) categorization of solo voices. The exception is in arrangements for male choir (TTBB) and barbershop quartets (TLBB), which sometimes label the lowest two parts baritone and bass.

== Range and subtypes ==
Bass vocal range (E_{2}–E_{4}) notated on the bass staff (left) and on piano keyboard in green with dot marking middle C (C_{4})

Bass has the lowest vocal range of all voice types, with the lowest tessitura. The low extreme for basses is generally C_{2} (65.4 Hz, two Cs below middle C). Some extreme bass singers, referred to as basso profondos and oktavists, are able to reach much lower than this. Within opera, the lowest note in the standard bass repertoire is D_{2}, sung by the character Osmin in Mozart's Die Entführung aus dem Serail, but few roles fall below F_{2}.

Although Osmin's note is the lowest 'demanded' in the operatic repertoire, lower notes are heard, both written and unwritten: for example, it is traditional for basses to interpolate a low C in the duet "Ich gehe doch rathe ich dir" in the same opera; in Richard Strauss' Der Rosenkavalier, Baron Ochs has an optional C_{2} ("Mein lieber Hippolyte"). The high extreme: a few bass roles in the standard repertoire call for a high F♯ or G (F♯_{4} and G_{4}, the one above middle C), but few roles go over F_{4}. In the operatic bass repertoire, the highest notes are a G♯_{4} (The Barber in The Nose by Shostakovich) and, in the aria "Fra l'ombre e gl'orrori" in Handel's serenata Aci, Galatea e Polifemo, Polifemo reaches an A_{4}.

Within the bass voice type category are seven generally recognized subcategories: basso cantante (singing bass), hoher bass (high bass), jugendlicher bass (juvenile bass), basso buffo ("funny" bass), Schwerer Spielbass (dramatic bass), lyric bass, and dramatic basso profondo (low bass).

=== Basso cantante/lyric high bass/lyric bass-baritone ===
Basso cantante means "singing bass". Basso cantante is a higher, more lyrical voice. It is produced using a more Italianate vocal production, and possesses a faster vibrato, than its closest Germanic/Anglo-Saxon equivalent, the bass-baritone.

- Max, Le chalet by Adolphe Adam
- Duke Bluebeard, Bluebeard's Castle by Béla Bartók
- Don Pizarro, Fidelio by Ludwig van Beethoven
- Count Rodolfo, La sonnambula by Bellini
- Blitch, Susannah by Carlisle Floyd
- Méphistophélès, Faust by Charles Gounod
- The King of Scotland, Ariodante by George Frideric Handel
- Don Alfonso, Così fan tutte by Wolfgang Amadeus Mozart
- Don Giovanni, Don Giovanni by Wolfgang Amadeus Mozart
- Figaro, The Marriage of Figaro by Wolfgang Amadeus Mozart
- The Voice of the Oracle, Idomeneo by Wolfgang Amadeus Mozart
- Silva, Ernani by Giuseppe Verdi
- Philip II, Don Carlos by Giuseppe Verdi
- Count Walter, Luisa Miller by Giuseppe Verdi
- Ferrando, Il trovatore by Giuseppe Verdi

=== Hoher Bass/dramatic high bass/dramatic bass-baritone ===
Hoher Bass or "high bass" or often a dramatic bass-baritone.

- Igor, Prince Igor by Alexander Borodin
- Boris, Boris Godunov by Modest Mussorgsky
- Klingsor, Parsifal by Richard Wagner
- Wotan, Der Ring des Nibelungen by Richard Wagner
- Caspar, Der Freischütz by Carl Maria von Weber
- Banquo, Macbeth by Giuseppe Verdi
- Zaccaria, Nabucco by Giuseppe Verdi
- Fiesco, Simon Boccanegra by Giuseppe Verdi

=== Jugendlicher Bass ===
Jugendlicher Bass (juvenile bass) denotes the role of a young man sung by a bass, regardless of the age of the singer.

- Masetto, Don Giovanni by Wolfgang Amadeus Mozart
- Colline, La bohème by Giacomo Puccini

=== Basso buffo/lyric buffo ===
Buffo, literally "funny", basses are lyrical roles that demand from their practitioners a solid coloratura technique, a capacity for patter singing and ripe tonal qualities if they are to be brought off to maximum effect. They are usually the blustering antagonist of the hero/heroine or the comic-relief fool in bel canto operas.

- Don Pasquale, Don Pasquale by Gaetano Donizetti
- Dottor Dulcamara, L'elisir d'amore by Gaetano Donizetti
- Doctor Bartolo, The Barber of Seville by Gioachino Rossini
- Don Magnifico, La Cenerentola by Gioachino Rossini
- Don Alfonso, Così fan tutte by Wolfgang Amadeus Mozart
- Leporello, Don Giovanni by Wolfgang Amadeus Mozart
- Papageno, Die Zauberflöte by Wolfgang Amadeus Mozart
- The Doctor, Wozzeck by Alban Berg

=== Schwerer Spielbass/dramatic buffo ===
English equivalent: dramatic bass

- Khan Konchak, Prince Igor by Alexander Borodin
- Baculus, Der Wildschütz by Albert Lortzing
- Ferrando, Il trovatore by Giuseppe Verdi
- Daland, Der fliegende Holländer by Richard Wagner
- Varlaam, Boris Godunov by Modest Mussorgsky

=== Lyric basso profondo ===
Basso profondo (lyric low bass) is the lowest bass voice type. According to J. B. Steane in Voices, Singers & Critics, the basso profondo voice "derives from a method of tone-production that eliminates the more Italian quick vibrato. In its place is a kind of tonal solidity, a wall-like front, which may nevertheless prove susceptible to the other kind of vibrato, the slow beat or dreaded wobble."

- Rocco, Fidelio by Ludwig van Beethoven
- Osmin, Die Entführung aus dem Serail by Wolfgang Amadeus Mozart
- Sarastro, Die Zauberflöte by Wolfgang Amadeus Mozart
- Pimen, Boris Godunov by Modest Mussorgsky
- Baron Ochs, Der Rosenkavalier by Richard Strauss
- Baldassarre, La favorite by Gaetano Donizetti

=== Dramatic basso profondo ===
English equivalent: dramatic low bass. Dramatic basso profondo is a powerful basso profondo voice.

- Il Commendatore, Don Giovanni by Wolfgang Amadeus Mozart
- Hagen, Götterdämmerung by Richard Wagner
- Heinrich, Lohengrin by Richard Wagner
- Gurnemanz, Parsifal by Richard Wagner
- Fafner, Das Rheingold and Siegfried by Richard Wagner
- Marke, Tristan und Isolde by Richard Wagner
- Hunding, Die Walküre by Richard Wagner
- The Varangian (Viking) Guest, Sadko by Nikolai Rimsky-Korsakov
- The Grand Inquisitor, Don Carlo by Giuseppe Verdi
- Claggart, Billy Budd by Benjamin Britten

=== In Gilbert and Sullivan ===
All of the Gilbert and Sullivan Savoy operas, except Patience and The Yeomen of the Guard, have at least one lead bass. Notable roles include:

- Adam Goodheart, Ruddigore
- Arac, Princess Ida
- Bob Becket (Carpenter's mate), H.M.S. Pinafore
- Don Alhambra del Bolero, The Gondoliers
- The Mikado of Japan, The Mikado
- The Notary, The Sorcerer
- Private Willis, Iolanthe
- Sergeant of Police, The Pirates of Penzance

== See also ==
- Category of basses
- Fach, the German system for classifying voices
- Voice classification in non-classical music
- List of basses in non-classical music
