= Rescue (a cappella group) =

American Christian a cappella quartet

Rescue is a Christian a cappella quartet of musical performers operating out of Gresham, OR. The group started as a quartet in 1997 consisting of Jason Overstreet, Jason McKenney, Chad Krober, and Matt Lusk and released their first album in 1999. Tim Storms, who set a Guinness World Record for the lowest note produced by a human in 2000, was a member of the group from 2001 until 2004. Overstreet is the only original member of the band still today. The group's albums and repertoire are still written, arranged, and produced by Overstreet.

== Discography ==
- Rescue (1999)
- 2000 Years Ago (1999)
- The First Christmas (2001)
- The Difference (2003)
- Reunion Live (2004) (also available as a DVD)
- Before the Throne (2008)
- Beautiful [a single] (2009)
- InDependence [an EP] (2010)
- Beautiful [full album] (2015)
- He Is Born [an EP] (2016)

== Members ==
=== Current members ===
- Jason Overstreet—Baritone/Vocal Percussion (1997–present)
- Brian Sell—Lead/Tenor (2005–present)
- Kovy Aguiar—Bass (2011-2014, 2017–present)
- Tyler Luecke—Tenor/Lead (2016–Present)
- Josh Reznick—Tenor/Lead (2016–Present)

=== Former members ===
- Matt Lusk
- Josh McKenney
- Chad Krober
- Jason Pearce
- Tim Storms (2001-2004)
- Mitch Fewell
- Josh Wheeler
- Luke Coles
- Dustin Allen
- Brandon Bell (2007-2009)
- Chris Benjamin
- Kris Strobeck (2011-2014)
- Jason "Jay" McKenny (1996-2004)
- Steve "Teeb" Cross (2006-2016)
