= The Singers Unlimited =

American jazz vocal group

- The Singers Unlimited in 1972 (left to right: Len Dresslar, Don Shelton, Bonnie Herman, Gene Puerling)

Background information
- Origin: Chicago, Illinois, U.S.
- Genres: Jazz, easy listening
- Years active: 1967–1982
- Label: MPS
- Past members: Gene Puerling; Len Dresslar; Bonnie Herman; Don Shelton

The Singers Unlimited was a four-part jazz vocal group formed by Gene Puerling in 1971. The group included Len Dresslar (better known as the Jolly Green Giant in General Mills commercials), Bonnie Herman, and Don Shelton.

== History ==
Gene Puerling (1929–2008) and Don Shelton (1934–present) had formed part of Puerling's vocal group, The Hi-Lo's, some years previously, though Shelton was a 1959 replacement for Hi-Lo's member Bob Strasen. The Singers Unlimited were created to record for commercials, but as time passed they were persuaded to record albums. On the recommendation of jazz pianist, Oscar Peterson, they signed a contract with MPS Records in Germany. Peterson's trio played on their first-recorded album, In Tune. The group made fifteen albums. Fourteen were recorded for MPS between 1971 and 1982 and were collected in the box set Magic Voices.

Puerling's arrangements for Singers Unlimited earned him a reputation as one of the best vocal writers in the world. Members of the vocal group Take 6 often give credit to him and the Singers Unlimited as innovators in a cappella, claiming they "went to school" on his arrangements.

Puerling took advantage of cutting-edge, multi-tracking techniques of German studio engineer, Hans Georg Brunner-Schwer, to create his harmonic concepts and the group's signature sound. In the overdubbing process, baritone Puerling and tenor Shelton often added two additional middle parts, after which all parts were "doubled" and "tripled." Creating these extra tracks created the fuller, richer sound of the group's recordings. The group recorded their songs by having Bonnie Herman record a simplified version of the melody, after which, Dresslar, Puerling, and Shelton filled in the remaining parts. Once this process had been completed, Herman's original melodic line was replaced with a new one, in which she could add melodic embellishments and add "color" to the group's sound.

Bass singer Dresslar (1924–2005) was known as the voice of the Jolly Green Giant ("Ho, Ho, Ho!") for over 40 years, as well as the voice behind other jingles. He was president of the Chicago branch of the American Federation of Television and Radio Artists (AFTRA) for several years in the mid-to-late 1980s.

Herman was the singer of the original "Like a Good Neighbor, State Farm Is There" commercial jingle, which ran for several years. She is the daughter of Lois Best and Jules Herman, a trumpeter in the Welk Orchestra, and the niece of the big band leader Woody Herman.

== Discography ==
- A Capella (MPS, 1971)
- Christmas (MPS, 1972)
- Four of Us (MPS, 1973)
- In Tune with the Oscar Peterson Trio (MPS, 1973)
- Invitation with Art Van Damme (MPS, 1974)
- A Capella II (MPS, 1975)
- Feeling Free with the Pat Williams Orchestra (MPS, 1975)
- A Special Blend (MPS, 1976)
- Sentimental Journey (MPS, 1976)
- Friends (Pausa, 1977)
- Eventide (MPS, 1978)
- Just in Time (Pausa, 1978)
- A Capella III (MPS, 1980)
- The Singers Unlimited with Rob McConnell and the Boss Brass (Pausa, 1979)
- Easy to Love (Pausa, 1981)
