= The Hi-Lo's =

Vocal quartet

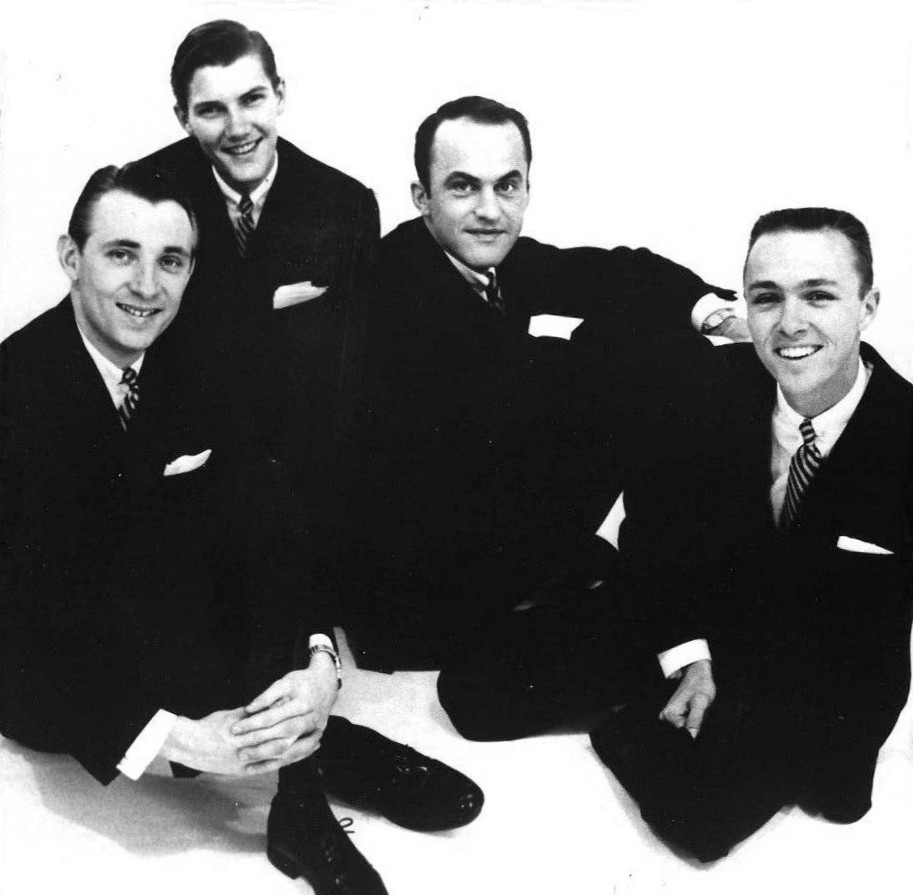
- The group in 1957

Background information
- Genres: Vocal pop, vocal jazz
- Years active: 1953–present
- Past members: Gene Puerling; Bob Strasen; Bob Morse; Clark Burroughs; Don Shelton

The Hi-Lo's were a vocal pop/jazz quartet formed in 1953, who achieved their greatest fame in the late 1950s and 1960s. The group's name is a reference to both their extreme vocal and physical ranges (Bob Strasen and Bob Morse were tall; Gene Puerling and Clark Burroughs were short).

== History ==
The group consisted of Gene Puerling (bass-baritone or fourth voice, arranger, leader, and occasional soloist), Bob Strasen (baritone or third voice), Bob Morse (baritone or second voice and frequent soloist) and Clark Burroughs (tenor or first voice/lead). In 1959, Strasen left the group after he began losing his voice to unknown causes. After Strasen's departure, Morse switched to the baritone or third part, and tenor Don Shelton sang the second part.

They were occasionally supported by Frank Sinatra. Clare Fischer was their pianist for years and occasionally wrote arrangements for the group.

The Hi-Lo's recorded the theme song to the 1956 television series Noah's Ark. They were also featured on the soundtrack of the motion picture Everything's Ducky (1961), contributing three songs: "Everything's Ducky," "Moonlight Music," and "The Scuttlebutt Walk." They made numerous appearances on television and had many live performances.

The first group which had the Hi-Lo's name was a barbershop quartet from Wisconsin, which won an award in Milwaukee in 1945. None of those original members were in Puerling's group which started some years later, The Singers Unlimited.

== Individual group members ==
In 1966, Gene Puerling and Don Shelton along with Bonnie Herman and Len Dressler, formed another vocal group, The Singers Unlimited. The group provided a wide range for Puerling's arrangements and multi-tracked as many as 16 voices. For that reason The Singers Unlimited were almost exclusively a recording group.

Bob Strasen died February 28, 1994, and Bob Morse on April 27, 2001. Afterward, Puerling, Shelton, and Burroughs still appeared occasionally as the Hi-Los's in various cities in southern California. Shelton is an accomplished reed player and has played in Clare Fischer's bands. Burroughs is semi-retired and can sometimes be heard on film soundtracks. On March 25, 2008, Puerling died just before his 79th birthday.

== Legacy ==
The Hi-Lo's and especially their innovative use of vocal harmony, were an influence on the groups and musicians Take 6, The King's Singers, The Manhattan Transfer, Chanticleer, The Free Design, Herbie Hancock, The Association, First Call, and Brian Wilson.

== Discography ==
- Listen! (Starlite, 1954)
- I Presume (Starlite, 1955)
- On Hand (Starlite, 1956)
- Under Glass (Starlite, 1956)
- The Hi-Lo's and the Jerry Fielding Orchestra (Kapp, 1956)
- Ring Around Rosie with Rosemary Clooney (Columbia, 1957)
- Suddenly It's the Hi-Lo's (Columbia, 1957)
- Now Hear This (Columbia, 1957)
- Love Nest (Columbia, 1958)
- And All That Jazz (Columbia, 1958) with The Marty Paich Dek-Tette; the album was inducted into the Grammy Hall of Fame in 1998
- Reflections in Rhythm with the Hi-Lo's! (Tiara Spotlight, 1958)
- The Hi-Lo's in Stereo (Omega Disk, 1959)
- All Over the Place (Columbia, 1960)
- Broadway Playbill (Columbia, 1960)
- This Time It's Love (Columbia, 1961)
- Happen to Folk Songs with Billy May (Reprise, 1962)
- The Hi-Lo's Happen to Bossa Nova (Reprise, 1963)
- Back Again (MPS, 1979)
- Now (Pausa, 1981)
- Cherries and Other Delights (Hindsight, 1993)
- Together Wherever We Go (Sony, 1994)
