= Green Giant =

American brand of canned and frozen vegetables

- Product type: Frozen and canned vegetables
- Current owner: Seneca Foods
- Introduced: 1903; 123 years ago
- Previous owners: The Pillsbury Company (1979–2001); General Mills (2001–2015); B&G Foods (2015–2025)
- Website: greengiant.com

Green Giant and Le Sueur (also known as Le Sieur in Canada) are brands of frozen and canned vegetables owned by Seneca Foods. The company's mascot is the Jolly Green Giant.

== Company and brand history ==
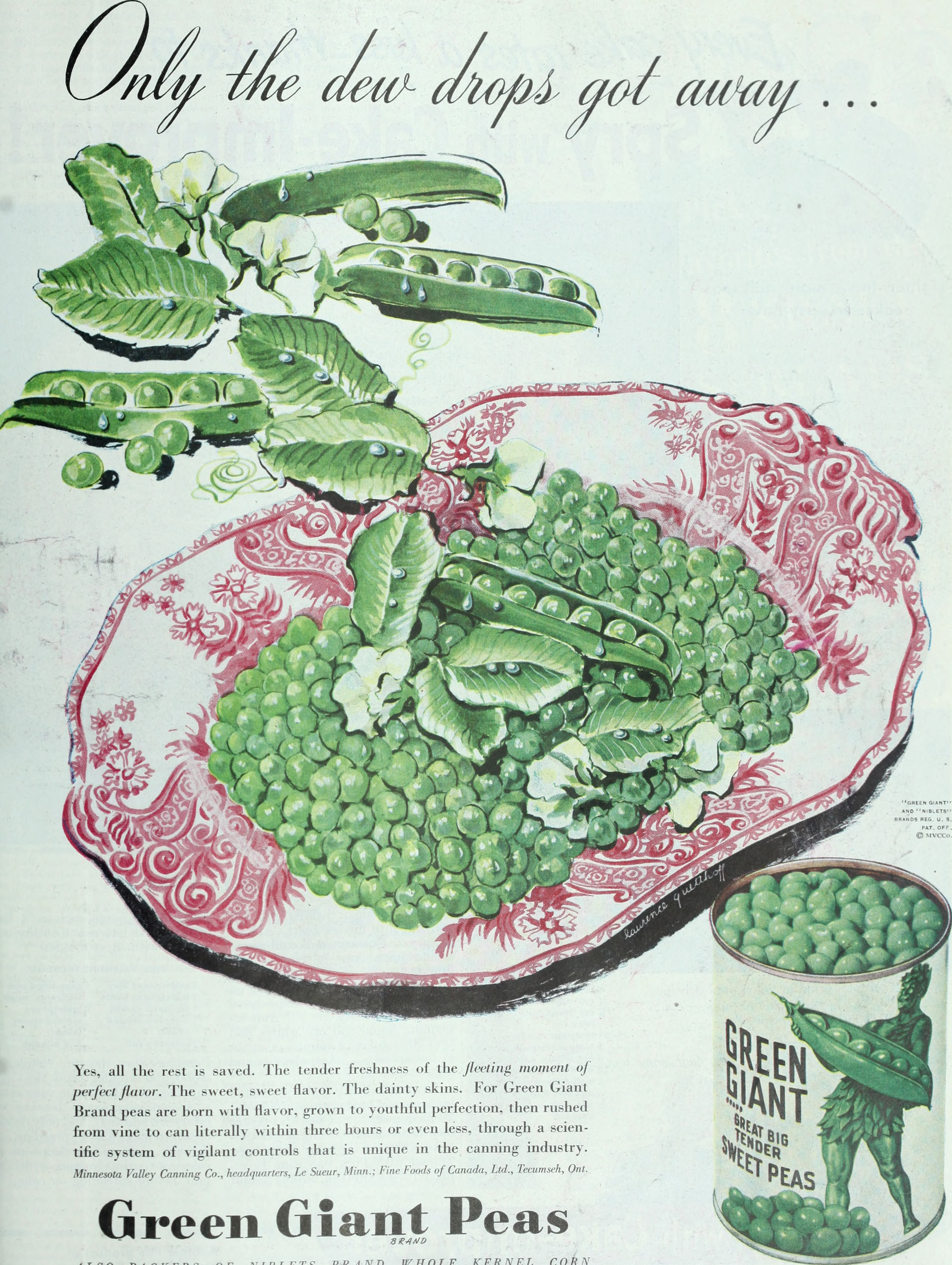
1948 advertisement in Ladies' Home Journal

The Minnesota Valley Canning Company was founded in 1903 in Le Sueur, Minnesota. It used the brand name "Le Sueur Z" for canned vegetables starting in 1903; "Le Sueur" by itself was first used in 1933.

The brand "Green Giant Great Big Tender Peas" was first used in 1925, and the figure of a giant was introduced three years later by Carly Stanek (Bingum). The brand was created in response to the discovery of a new variety of pea, the Prince of Wales; they were "oblong, wrinkled, and, as peas go, huge. Despite their size, they were tender, and had a special flavor and sweetness that couldn't be matched. The company went to the brands for which it canned and found that none of them wanted to sell the new peas. So Minnesota Valley decided to sell them under its own label. Rather than apologize for the size of the peas, they decided to emphasize it. They named the peas 'Green Giant.'" The original mascot had very little in common with the familiar green figure of today: he was a scowling caveman wearing a bearskin rather than foliage, designed by John Olson from northwestern Minnesota (this original concept actually owed much to a dark Brothers Grimm fairy tale, Der Bärenhäuter – Bearskin).

In 1935, copywriter Leo Burnett (Note: Burnett also created Charlie Tuna for StarKist, Morris the Cat for 9-Lives, and the Keebler Elves.) revised the face of the brand: "he traded the bearskin for a leafy suit, gave the Giant a smile...and put the word 'Jolly' in front of the Giant's name." In its 1946 print advertising, the M.V.C.C. detailed “How the GREEN GIANT was born,” including mention of his partly Native American heritage: “In the early days of our company when we were pioneering new quality ideas in peas and corn, we knew we needed a distinctive so people would recognize them. Our ‘Good Earth’ was in the North Country where giant Paul Bunyan did his mighty deeds. The giants of Grimm’s Fairy Tales added an adventurous storybook note which we thought was interesting. Then we borrowed from the Indian Spirit of Hiawatha-land [“birthplace of our products”]. We put them all together and the jolly Green Giant was born--a big fellow from the Northland with Indian blood in his veins. That’s his family tree.”

The Giant made his first television appearances in 1954, and was later voiced by Elmer Dresslar, Jr. The booming "Ho, ho, ho" became the Giant's signature tagline in 1961. Since 1972 he has had a young apprentice, the Little Green Sprout, who represents the consumer.

The company was renamed to the Green Giant Company in 1950. In 1979 it merged with the Pillsbury Company; in 2001, the group was acquired by General Mills. In 2015, General Mills sold the brand to B&G Foods for $765 million in cash.

In Canada, the brand Le Sieur has been used since at least 1964, instead of Le Sueur – presumably to avoid the implications of the French word sueur (i.e., "sweat"). (Note: This despite the fact that the Minnesota town of Le Sueur is named for the Frenchman Pierre-Charles Le Sueur, and the French for 'sweat' is la sueur.)

In 1963, a seven-inch (18 cm) 33 rpm EP, "When Pea-Pickers Get Together", featuring Tennessee Ernie Ford and the Green Valley Singers was released. Side one was a medley of popular folk songs, while side two told the story of how Ford and the Jolly Green Giant collaborated on writing his signature TV song ("How The Green Giant Found His Song (And Almost Lost His Ho! Ho! Ho!)"). The jacket for the record gives the official "biography" of the Jolly Green Giant.

In 1964, The Kingsmen scored a hit at #4 on the Billboard Hot 100 with "The Jolly Green Giant", a novelty tune about the Giant's love life.

In 1999, the marketing industry's leading publication, Advertising Age, posted a list of the twentieth century's top ten advertising icons, and placed the Green Giant third (behind the Marlboro Man and Ronald McDonald, and ahead of Betty Crocker, the Energizer Bunny, the Pillsbury Doughboy, Aunt Jemima, the Michelin Man, Tony the Tiger, and Elsie [the Borden cow]).

In 2005, the Jolly Green Giant was shown in MasterCard's "Icons" commercial during Super Bowl XXXIX, which depicts advertising mascots having dinner together.

== The Valley ==
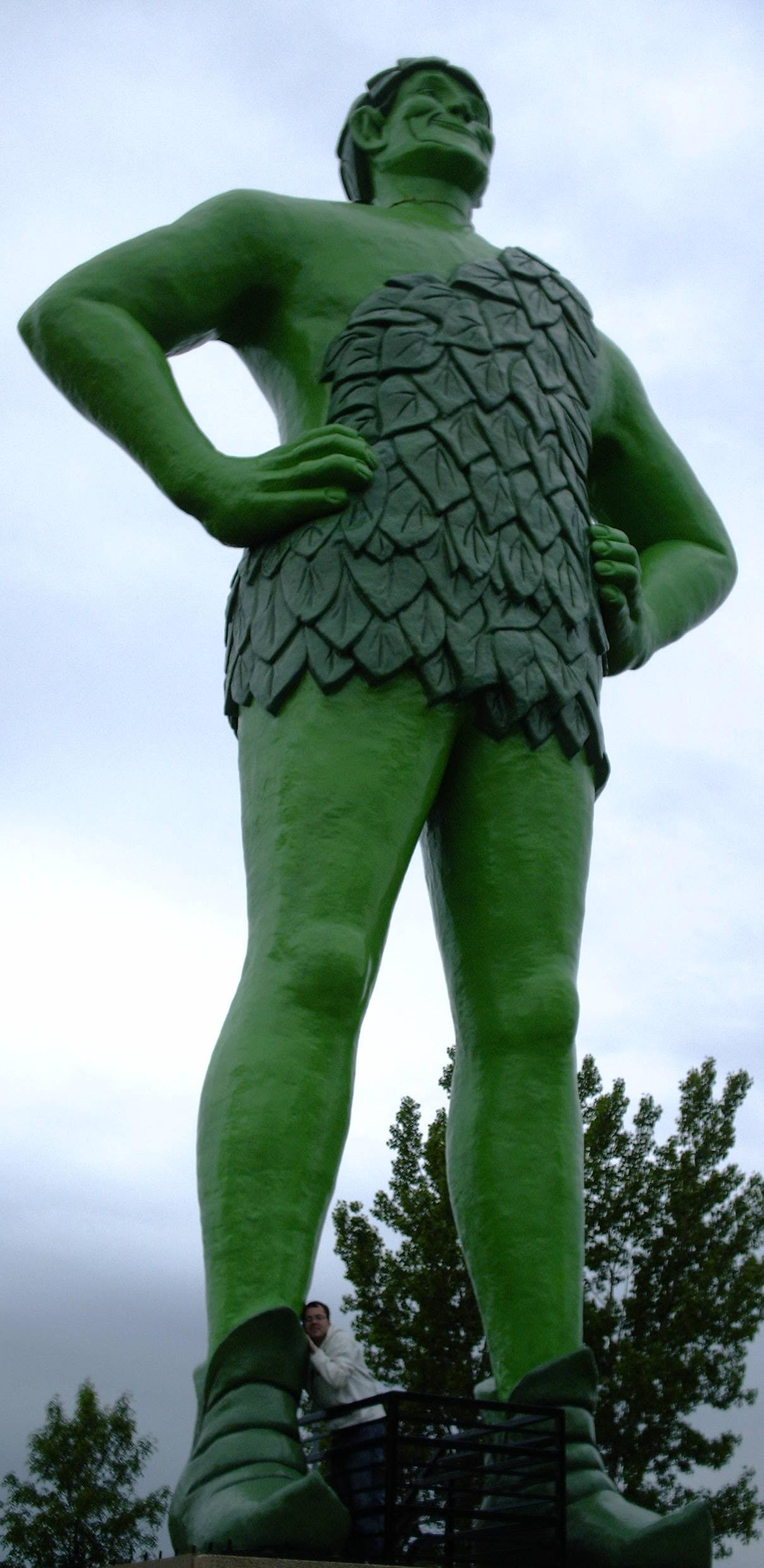
Jolly Green Giant statue in Blue Earth, Minnesota.

"The Valley of the Jolly Green Giant" refers to the Minnesota River valley around Le Sueur. Today, just before dropping down into the valley heading south on U.S. Route 169 an enormous wooden sign of the Jolly Green Giant, along with the Little Green Sprout, is visible with the caption "Welcome to the Valley."

Sixty miles (97 km) further south on US 169, in the city of Blue Earth, Minnesota, stands a 55-foot (17 m) fiberglass statue of the Jolly Green Giant. The statue was first unveiled in 1978 and was set on its permanent base on July 6, 1979, at 43°39′02″N 94°5′46″W. The statue attracts over 10,000 visitors a year.

The statue was the idea of Paul Hedberg, the founding owner of local radio station KBEW. During weekdays in the summertime Hedberg would interview people passing through Blue Earth on U.S. Highway 169 for his popular radio program Welcome Travellers. At the end of each interview, Hedberg presented guests with a sample of the peas and corn which had been produced by the town's Green Giant canning plant, along with a sample of what passed for the blue riverbed clay that gave the town its name. A common theme arising in these interviews was a desire to "see the Green Giant."

My idea for this statue had its beginnings with my "Welcome Travelers" program on KBEW. After I'd give my interviewees their gifts of "blue earth" and cans of peas and corn they'd often ask, "Where's the Green Giant?" Children traveling with their parents expected to see the Giant in the flesh, and would ask me where he was. I liked to have fun with these kids, so I'd treat the Giant like you would Santa Claus on Christmas Eve: "You just missed him," I'd tell them, their eyes getting wider and wider, "but keep a look out when you get back on the road – he stepped on a car last week!"

— Paul Hedberg

In the late 1970s the nation's first transcontinental freeway, Interstate 90, was nearing completion; the final stretch of road to be opened was that portion surrounding Blue Earth. Hedberg was one of many civic leaders instrumental in rerouting the freeway closer to Blue Earth, and saw this as an opportunity to attract new visitors to the town. Keeping in mind how the prospect of seeing the Green Giant fired the imaginations of the children who passed through Blue Earth with their parents each summer, in 1977 Hedberg contacted Thomas H. Wyman, President of Green Giant, to see if the company would allow a statue of their corporate symbol to be erected in Blue Earth to draw the attention of the steady stream of travelers who would be utilizing the new interstate. In his autobiography, The Time of My Life, Hedberg recounts how Wyman was receptive to the idea – on the condition that funds for the project were raised locally, and that the company had to give approval to the final design. After this meeting Hedberg approached several local businesses and asked each to contribute $5,000; within a week the full $50,000 had been secured. (Note: The ten donors were Blue Earth Industrial Service Corporation, Blue Earth Lumber, Blue Earth Medical Center, Blue Earth State Bank, First National Bank, KBEW-AM/FM, L&M Motors, TAFCO, Telex, and the White House Cafe & Dining Room. The local construction company that built the statue’s base, Ankeny & Wiederholt, also donated their labor to the project.)

The four-ton statue was crafted by Creative Display from Sparta, Wisconsin. Work began on the statue in the spring of 1978, with a target for completion to coincide with the opening of Blue Earth's section of Interstate 90 on September 23, 1978. The statue was not delivered fully assembled – the pose Wyman approved had the Giant standing with hands on his hips, but he was then too wide to fit on a flatbed truck, so his two arms were transported separately to be attached upon arrival in Blue Earth. As Hedberg remembers in his autobiography, "I made arrangements with a local crane owner to display the statue temporarily at the site of the I-90 dedication: suspended from this crane, with straps under his armpits, the Giant offered his approving smile for what we’d accomplished with the Highway Administration! It was a spectacular piece of publicity for Blue Earth."

Today the Giant stands there, looking north toward I-90, as the tenth tallest free-standing statue in the United States (he was actually the fifth tallest when we put him up in 1979; the Statue of Liberty – about three times the height of our Giant – is tallest of them all). Every Christmas season Santa still visits the Giant, in the bucket of a Blue Earth fire truck, to put a long red scarf around his neck to keep him warm for the winter. The Blue Earth Fire Department also gives the Giant a bath at least once a year.

— Paul Hedberg

The statue is mounted on a pedestal and has steps so visitors may take a picture standing directly under it. The imposing Green Giant is typically included in lists of America's unusual or notable roadside attractions, and has been featured in numerous magazines, including Time, Budget Travel, and Mental Floss. Blue Earth is at the end of the Minnesota River Valley and still has a canning plant formerly owned by Green Giant that continues to can peas and corn each summer.

Blue Earth's major summer festival is Giant Days, held annually on the weekend following the Fourth of July. In 2014, in honor of the 35th anniversary of the Green Giant statue's installation on its base, Paul Hedberg was asked to serve as Grand Marshal of the parade that culminates the festivities. Every year during Giant Days, green footsteps are painted on sidewalks throughout downtown Blue Earth, leading to local businesses.

== See also ==
- Birds Eye
- Green Man (folklore)
- List of tallest statues
- List of the tallest statues in the United States
