= Starland Vocal Band (album) =

1976 debut album by Starland Vocal Band

Studio album by Starland Vocal Band
- Released: 1976
- Recorded: 1975
- Length: 34:23
- Label: Windsong Records
- Producer: Milt Okun

Starland Vocal Band chronology
Starland Vocal Band (1976)	Rear View Mirror (1977)

Starland Vocal Band is the debut album by the American pop group Starland Vocal Band. It was released in 1976 by John Denver's label, Windsong Records.

The album peaked at number 20 on the Billboard 200 in August 1976, and features the band's best-known song, "Afternoon Delight", which topped the Billboard Hot 100 in July 1976. "California Day" peaked at number 20 in October.

== Critical reception ==
Professional ratings
Review scores
Source	Rating
AllMusic	4/5 stars

Scott Garside of the Daily Record wrote in an August 1976 review: "Their smooth, rich vocals and harmonies are unbeatable. However, when the instrumentation becomes prominent, the Starland Vocal Band sounds like an average folk quartet."

In another contemporary review, David Proctor of The Daily Utah Chronicle wrote: "This album is one of the gratifying surprises of the year so far. [...] Highlights are 'Boulder to Birmingham,' 'California Day,' 'Baby, You Look Good to Me Tonight' and a gorgeous a cappella version of Paul Simon's 'American Tune.' Get it, it's worth the gamble."

Rob Theakston of AllMusic gave the album a rating of four out of five stars, writing: "Those looking for nine songs that are on par with 'Afternoon Delight' will be sorely disappointed, as most of the songs are somber in nature and don't come anywhere close to the pleasantries of their one major hit. But that's not to say the songs are of poor quality."

== Track listing ==
Information taken from the original LP. All writing by Bill Danoff unless otherwise noted.

Side One
No.	Title	Writer(s)	Length
1.	"Boulder to Birmingham"	B. Danoff, Emmylou Harris	4:14
2.	"Baby, You Look Good to Me Tonight"		3:04
3.	"American Tune"	Paul Simon	3:24
4.	"Starland"		3:04
5.	"California Day"		3:35

Side Two
No.	Title	Writer(s)	Length
6.	"War Surplus Baby"	B. Danoff (lyrics), Jon Carroll (music)	4:19
7.	"Starting All Over Again"		3:09
8.	"Afternoon Delight"		3:12
9.	"Hail! Hail! Rock and Roll!"	B. Danoff, Taffy Danoff	2:42
10.	"Ain't It The Fall"		3:40
Total length:			34:23
