= Forever Country =

2016 song by Artists of Then, Now & Forever

Single by Artists of Then, Now & Forever
- Released: September 16, 2016
- Genre: Country
- Length: 4:02
- Label: MCA Nashville
- Songwriters: Bill Danoff; Taffy Nivert; John Denver ("Take Me Home, Country Roads"); Willie Nelson ("On the Road Again"); Dolly Parton ("I Will Always Love You")
- Producer: Shane McAnally

Music video
- "Artists Of Then, Now & Forever - Forever Country" on YouTube

"Forever Country" is a 2016 medley performed by Artists of Then, Now & Forever, a one-time gathering of 30 American country music artists. The song combines elements of three previous 1970s country hits: John Denver's "Take Me Home, Country Roads" (1971), Willie Nelson's "On the Road Again" (1979), and Dolly Parton's "I Will Always Love You" (1973). The song was recorded to commemorate the Country Music Association Awards reaching its 50th year. Originally, CMA Awards producers had wanted to record a cover of a single song; the idea to instead record a mashup came from Joseph Kahn, who directed the song's music video. The song was recorded in a span of three days in Nashville, Tennessee, in June 2016 with Shane McAnally as producer, with the music video produced concurrently.

"Forever Country" was released on September 16, 2016, and the video premiered four days later on September 20 during Dancing with the Stars. All profits from the sale and streaming of the song go to music education supported by the CMA Foundation.

The song debuted atop Billboard's Hot Country Songs chart, becoming the third song in history to achieve the feat and giving every artist featured on the song a number one hit.

In a rare display, the rival Academy of Country Music gave "Forever Country" and the CMA their Video of the Year Award at their 2017 ceremony.

== Development ==
=== Background and development ===
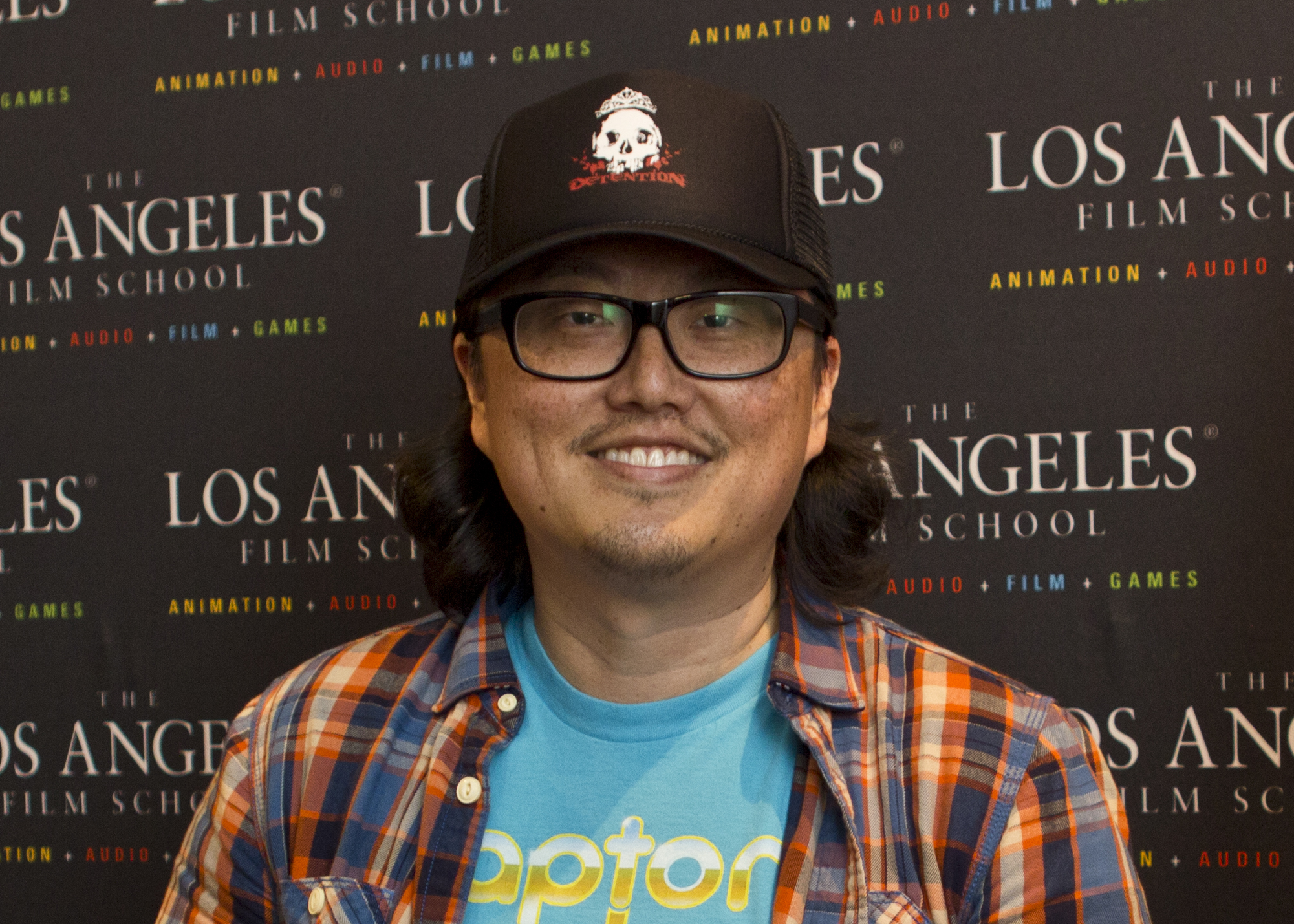
Joseph Kahn conceived the idea of assembling three songs together, sung by numerous artists, after rebuffing the idea of just presenting one song.

The song was recorded to honor the 50th Annual Country Music Association (CMA) Awards. It was produced by Shane McAnally and is a mashup of three existing songs: "I Will Always Love You" by Dolly Parton, "Take Me Home, Country Roads" by John Denver, and "On the Road Again" by Willie Nelson. Along with Nelson and Parton singing portions of their own songs, the song features 28 other current and veteran country acts who are all previous CMA winners; Denver died in 1997. Randy Travis, who was incapacitated by a stroke in 2013, was unable to record but makes a silent cameo appearance in the music video and is credited as an artist. Parton, Nelson, and Denver are all former CMA Entertainer of the Year winners.

The idea for the song and its accompanying video was born at a CMA board meeting as a way to celebrate the milestone of 50 years of the CMA Awards. Everyone was brainstorming about an interesting and unique way to honor the 50th anniversary." The CMAs then approached Joseph Kahn – after he won the Grammy Award for Best Music Video for Taylor Swift's "Bad Blood" at the 58th Annual Grammy Awards – and solicited his opinion about whether there were any country songs which he would like to do. Kahn began to think about different possible songs but felt that the choices were too limited in terms of trying to get the entire history of country music into one song. So he pitched the CMA board the idea of doing a mash-up of three different songs, so that one would get more of a breadth of the history. He told CNN, "I didn't think one song could encapsulate all of country music, so I pitched the idea of doing a mashup of a couple songs and blending them together." But Kahn was told that it would never work and the reaction was the same from whomever he approached.

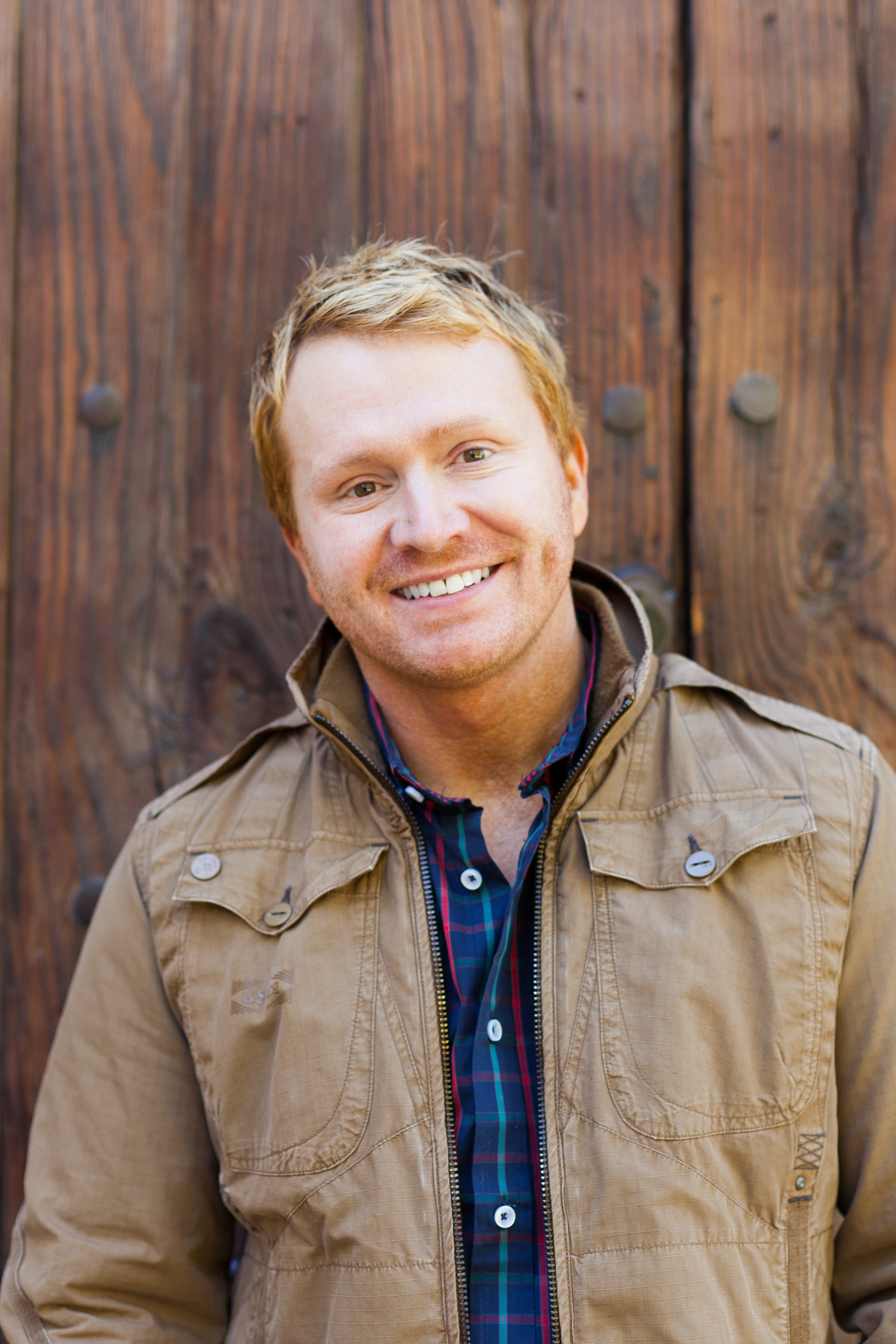
Shane McAnally produced the song.

After the idea coalesced, Shane McAnally was asked to take up the assignment to execute Kahn's idea. He was among the first people approached to take up the task, being on the CMA board partly as a result of his star-making work with Kacey Musgraves and Old Dominion. He happily took on the job, but admits that he was hesitant to make a medley of the songs at first, saying that the process might work for the pop genre, but not for country, since "...we tell stories. And we can't just cut into them and take a piece." He admitted that mashing together a bunch of country classics was "a very scary process" and although Kahn wanted three songs, he envisioned one song being the focus.

The two of them started with songs in mind that had the same tempo and same chord progressions. During the song searching process, a total of 40 songs were considered as potential contenders, most of which were previous CMA Song of the Year winners, or at least been nominated, and songs with universal themes that could sound like a love song to the country genre. Originally, Kahn wanted to incorporate songs including "Gentle on My Mind" by Glen Campbell and "The Gambler" by Kenny Rogers. But everybody would keep coming back to "I Will Always Love You" by Dolly Parton, saying that it was a quintessential song in the country genre.

Kahn kept rebuffing this suggestion since he felt his choices of music would not blend together with the song. He presented a demo of a second medley he made, which everyone loved, but nevertheless they still requested that he incorporate "I Will Always Love You." Kahn did not object to the idea but did not see how a ballad could be placed on the same track as uptempo songs. McAnally similarly did not see how "I Will Always Love You" could fit in, since it was a song addressed to one person.

Then one day, as co-arranger Josh Osborne and Kahn were playing around in the latter's office, the two realized that one could sing the verses of "I Will Always Love You" in the same tempo as "Take Me Home, Country Roads" and blend them without changing the chord structure, and it worked. Kahn gave credit to those people who were so persistent in incorporating the song; without them, he said, he would have never tried it. McAnally changed his mind as well, feeling that when "I Will Always Love You" – which he considers "sacred" – is sung over "Take Me Home, Country Roads", it takes on a new life, as a sort of love song to country music itself. McAnally was worried about approaching Parton to sing on the recording, as he thought that she might think that including "I Will Always Love You" in a medley would compromise the integrity of the song.

Nelson's "On the Road Again," which is an ode to the life of a traveling musician, was considered a natural addition to the mix, in part because of the line "The life I love is making music with my friends", which kept coming into the mind of McAnally as he was thinking of material to use.

=== Selection process and recording ===
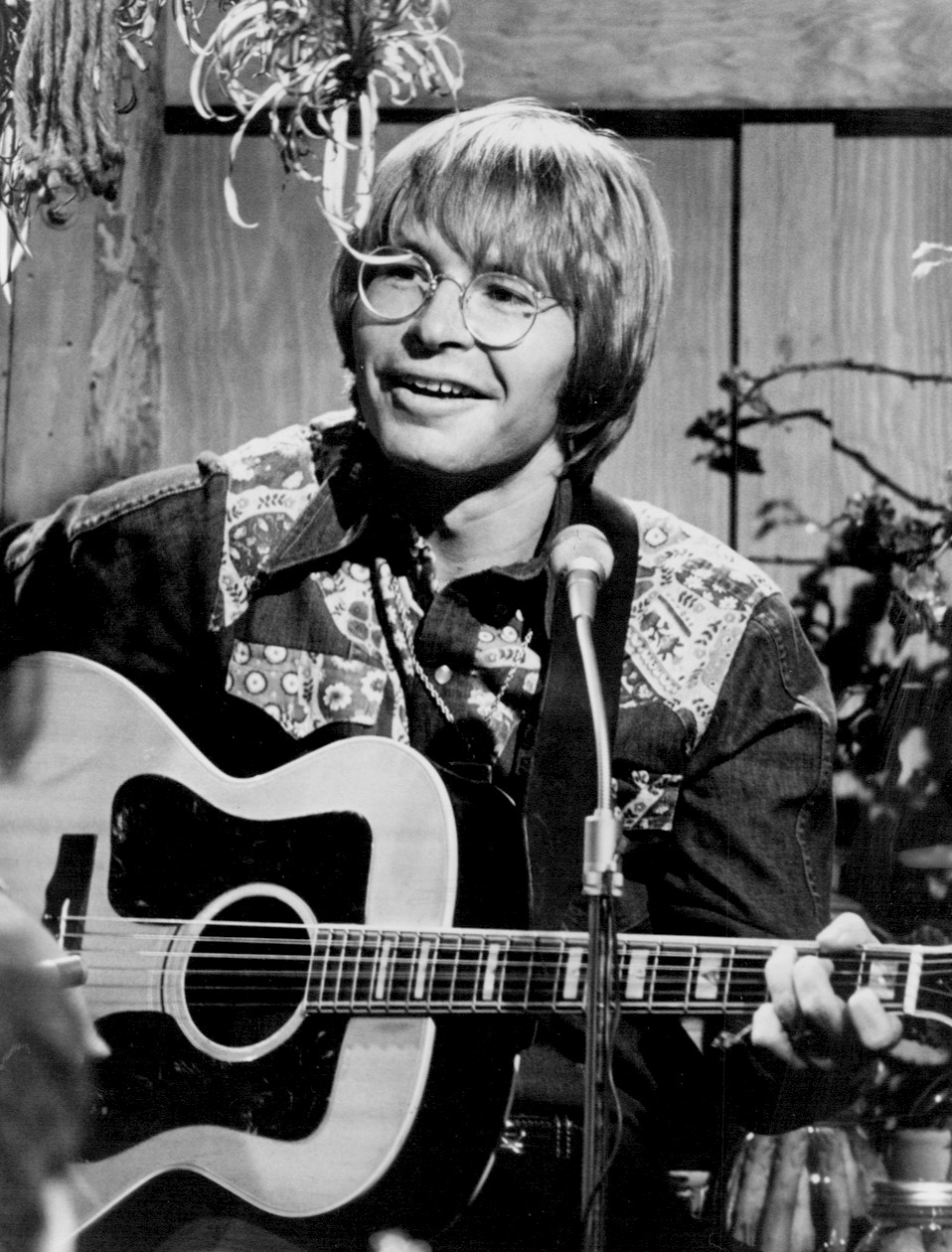
One of the three main artists whose songs were featured, John Denver.

Initially, it was unknown how many stars would participate. To narrow the list down, only previous CMA winners were considered for the parts. Artists like Miranda Lambert, Luke Bryan, and Brad Paisley who came in early had to cover a lot of ground, since it was not known if every line would be covered. Lambert for one would record almost the entire "Take Me Home, Country Roads" and pieces of "On the Road Again". McAnally kept saying, "I need your voice, if I don't get all these singers, to cover these patches." In an interview with Billboard magazine, McAnally said that "some of those people were really generous with their time, singing a lot more than what ended up on the track. As we neared the finish line, it came down to some folks literally having just one line left they could sing, and it was like, "Please, God, just let this work with their voice."" Most of the artists sang a line or two, while Little Big Town appeared the most. Not every artist contacted was able to make it into the project. There were a handful of people with whom the team could not get their schedules to work.

The recording session took place in Nashville a few days before the CMA Music Festival in June 2016. Most of the artists recorded their parts as they came through Nashville on tour stopovers. And by the time it was scheduled to shoot the video two days leading up to the CMT Awards and CMA Festival, nearly everyone was in town to stop by the soundstage, although for George Strait, a couple of last-minute vocals were recorded the same day the singer shot a video cameo. Nearly all artists who were approached made it into the finished product, although a few artists including Kenny Chesney, Billy Currington, Zac Brown Band, Thomas Rhett, Chris Young, Toby Keith, and Florida Georgia Line either could not do the vocal or the video. Randy Travis was the only one who appears only in the video due to health problems which have taken him out of performing; Travis would not return to singing publicly until October of that year, and even then only on a very limited basis. Kahn said that "even though he's not singing, he's connecting."

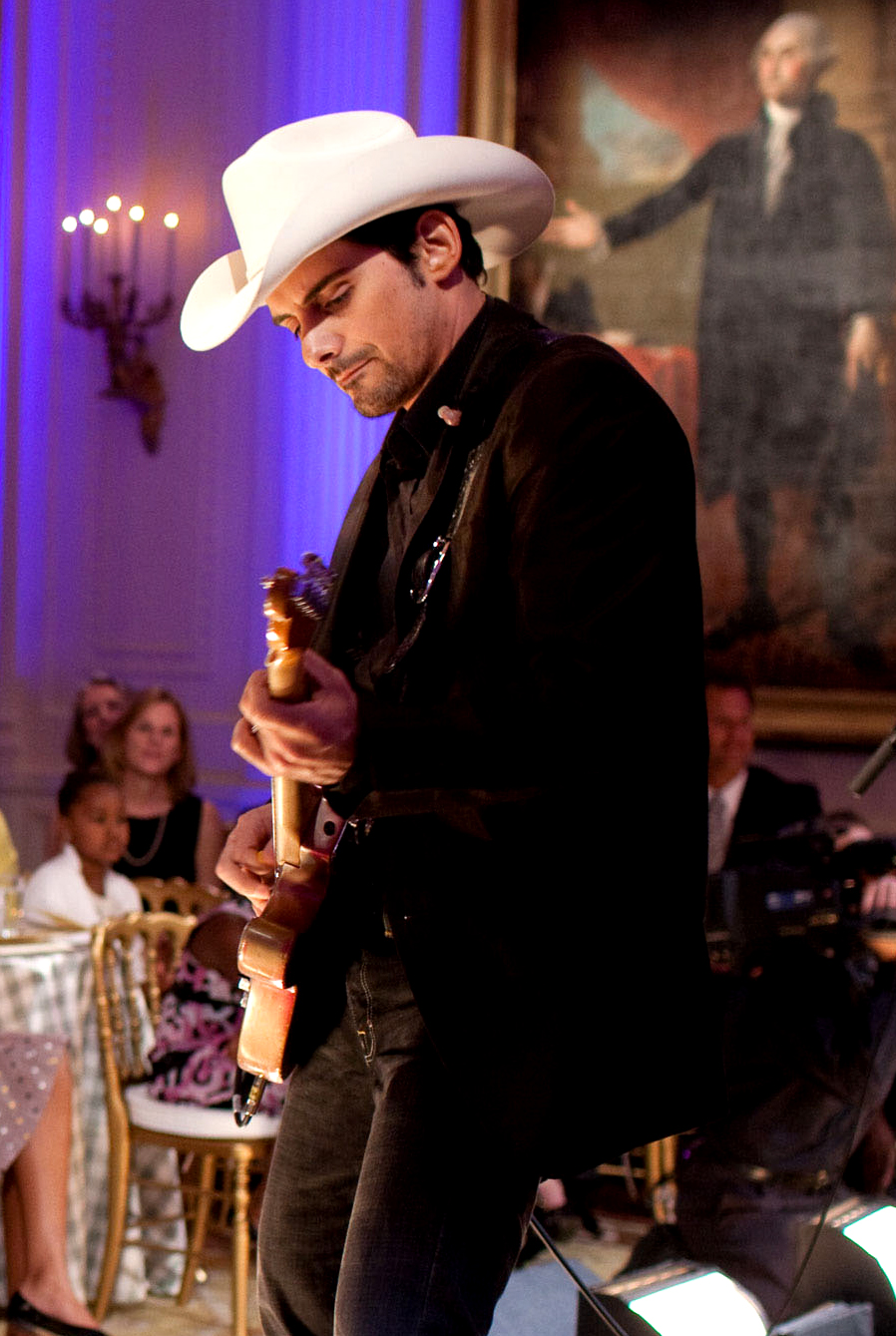
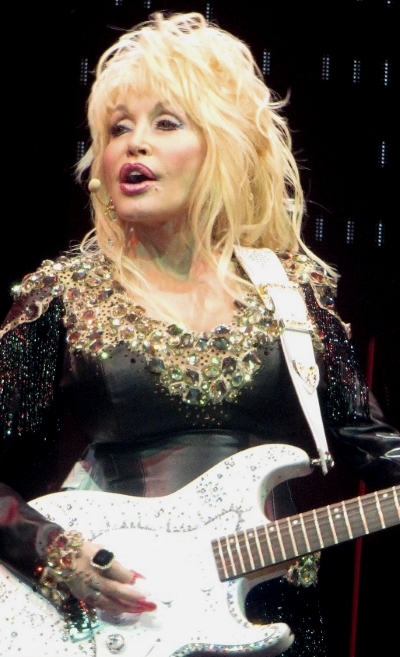
Brad Paisley (left) and Dolly Parton (right) were strategically chosen to begin and end the song.

McAnally wanted Paisley, a native of West Virginia, to open the song with Denver's "Take Me Home, Country Roads," and he wanted Carrie Underwood specifically to open Dolly Parton's "I Will Always Love You." Parton, who is known to arrive early for her appointments, arrived really early on her recording day, even before producer McAnally had arrived. During the recording session, McAnally became very nervous and told Parton: "I don't know how I am supposed to direct you singing 'I Will Always Love You,' but I am going to do my best." Kahn similarly stated, "I have literally worked with everybody but Dolly Parton made me nervous."

While most of the artists who sang the same line together were pre-planned, Lambert's and Bryan's duet happened accidentally. Underwood was skeptical when she first heard the idea of the mashup and questioned how it would work since three very different songs were incorporated. She later said that she felt honored to be a part of it, and to be singing parts on "I Will Always Love You", which she actually performs on her tours recurrently. Miranda Lambert said that she felt the same way but later commented saying, "It's really cool that almost everybody that's part of the project had a duet together or performed together or toured together or something as a combo." When Blake Shelton received the call to be a part of the project, he was so enthusiastic he did not even ask what song it was. Keith Urban, who was nominated for Entertainer of the Year in 2016, explained why the song is timeless and resonates to so many people: "I've played 'Take Me Home, Country Roads' many, many times. As geographic as the song is in so many places, it's also incredibly universal. I think that's why songs like that transcend everything, because it's about home and very universal, human things.”

== Forever Country musicians ==
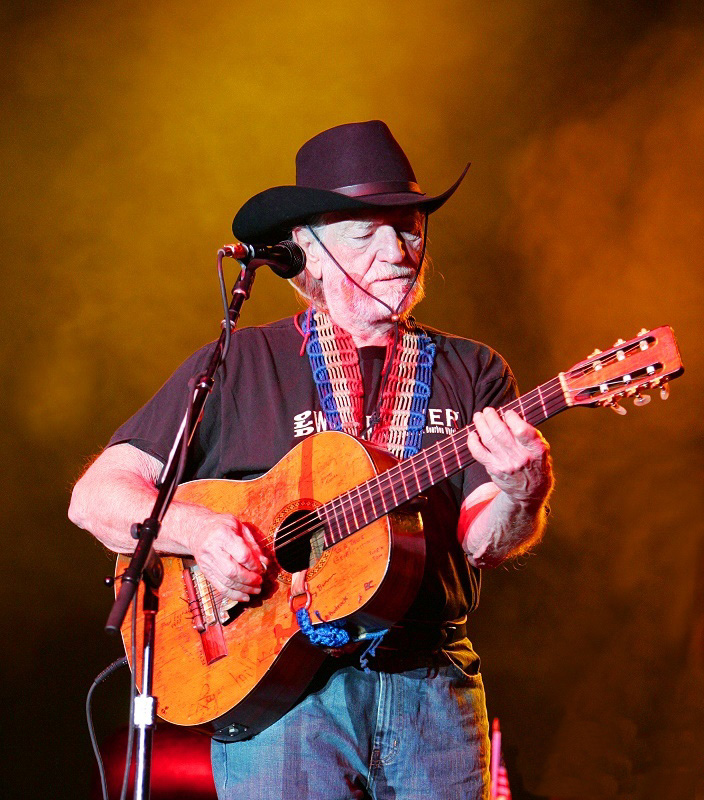
Willie Nelson was one of the veteran artists to make an appearance in the song.

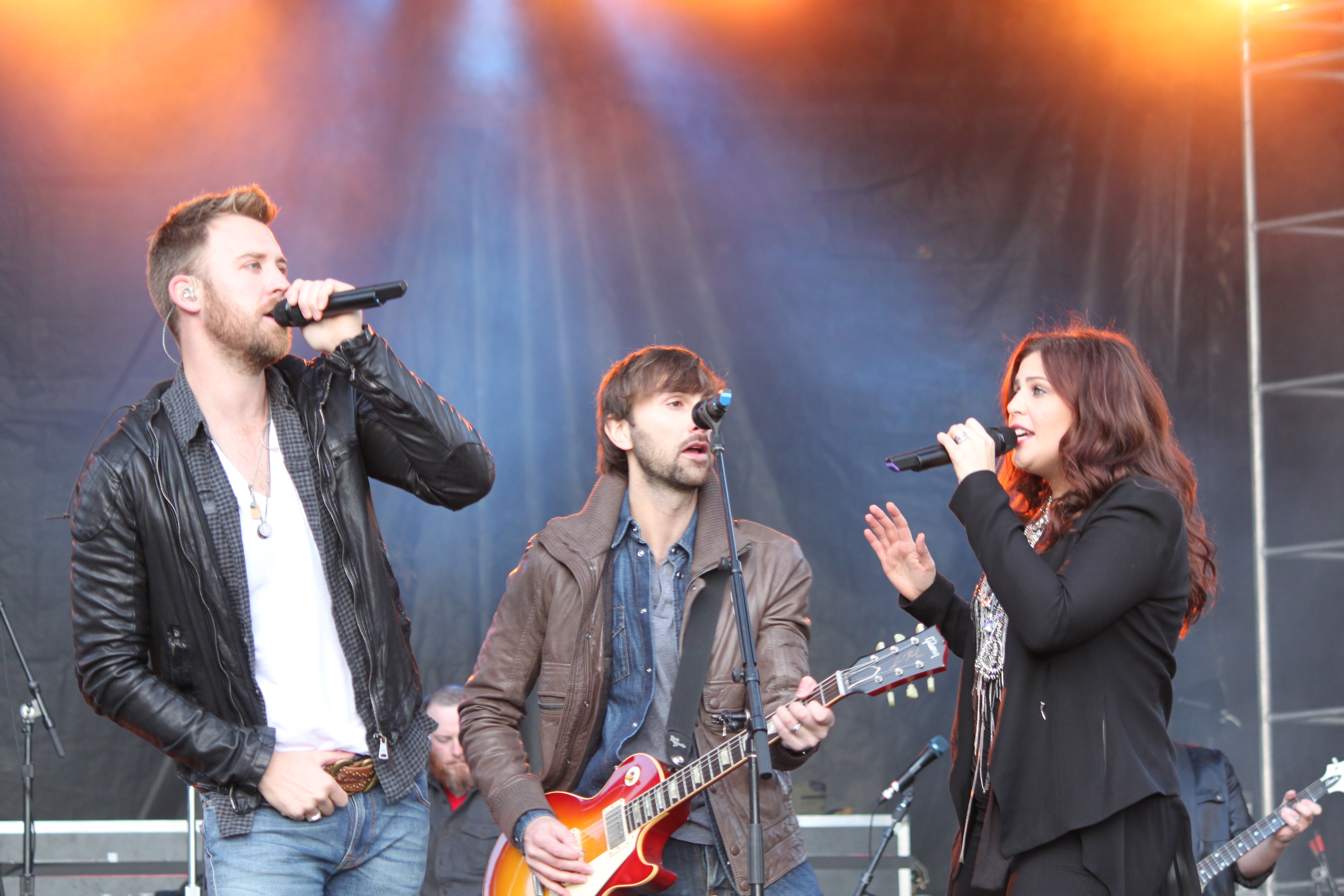
Lady A (pictured) were one of five bands to be featured, along with Alabama, Rascal Flatts, Brooks and Dunn, and Little Big Town.

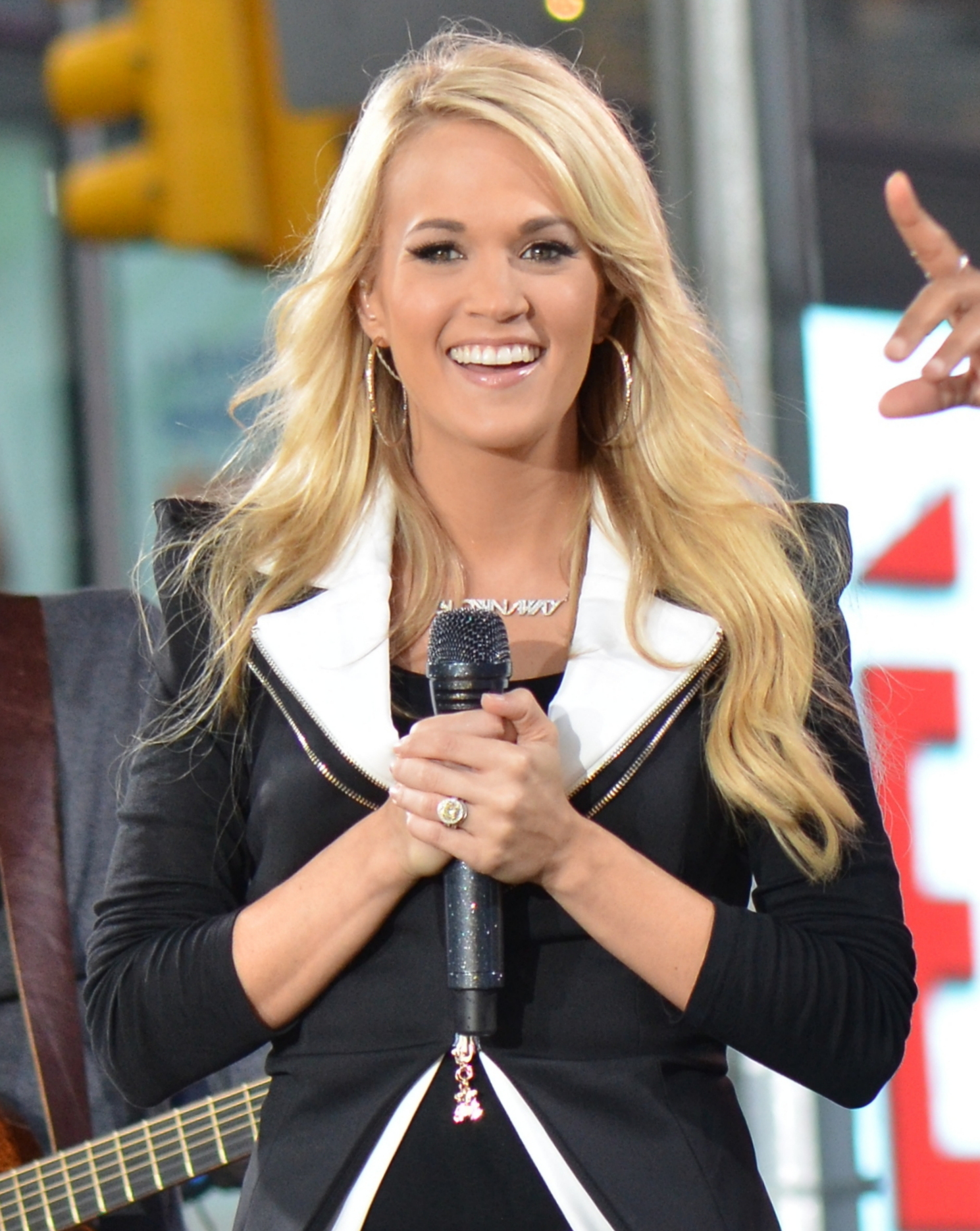
Carrie Underwood opened the finale part of the song with "I Will Always Love You".

Artists in order of their first appearance:

- Brad Paisley
- Keith Urban
- Tim McGraw
- Faith Hill
- Little Big Town
- Luke Bryan
- Miranda Lambert
- Randy Travis
- Blake Shelton
- George Strait
- Kacey Musgraves
- Eric Church
- Ronnie Milsap
- Charley Pride
- Dierks Bentley
- Trisha Yearwood
- Lady Antebellum
- Darius Rucker
- Martina McBride
- Jason Aldean
- Rascal Flatts
- Willie Nelson
- Brooks & Dunn
- Alabama
- Brett Eldredge
- Reba McEntire
- Alan Jackson
- Vince Gill
- Carrie Underwood
- Dolly Parton

== Release and reception ==
The song was released on September 16, 2016, to radio stations, streaming services, and digital retailers at 8:30 AM ET across the United States and in several key international markets. It was made available at all digital retail and streaming outlet partners simultaneously. Universal Music Group partnered with CMA to market and distribute the track worldwide. CMA profits from the sales and streaming of "Forever Country" will benefit music education causes through the CMA Foundation.

West Virginia Governor Earl Ray Tomblin expressed his enthusiasm on Twitter saying, ""Forever Country" – a great new take on an iconic West Virginia song – is making West Virginians everywhere swell with pride."

== Chart performance ==
Forever Country was released to country radio on September 16, 2016, via Universal Music Group Nashville's MCA Nashville branch. It debuted at number one on the US Hot Country Songs chart on October 8, 2016, becoming only the third song to ever debut atop the chart since Hot Country Songs began as a multi-metric chart in October 1958 ("More Than a Memory" (2007) by Garth Brooks and "My Baby's Got a Smile on Her Face" (2015) by Craig Wayne Boyd). The single sold 93,000 downloads and was streamed 5.7 million times in its first week. It also debuted atop the Country Digital Song Sales and Country Streaming Songs charts. The song went on to spend a second week at number one on the Hot Country Songs and Country Digital Song Sales charts, although it descended to number two on Country Streaming Songs, with a 34% drop to 61,000 sold and streaming down 38% percent to 3.5 million. As of March 2020, the single has sold 454,000 copies in the US. On May 15, 2017, the single was certified gold by the Recording Industry Association of America (RIAA), for combined sales and streaming of over 500,000 units in the United States.

On the US Billboard Hot 100 chart, the song debuted at number 21 on the chart dated for the week ending October 8, 2016, becoming the week's top new entry on the Hot 100.

The song debuted at number 39 on the Country Airplay chart for the week ending October 1, 2016, from less than three full days of airplay (September 16–18). It moved up to No. 33 on October 8 following 5.4 million streams in its full week.

Following the release of "Forever Country", the three original songs that were included saw an upsurge in their sales: "On the Road Again" increased by 181% to 5,000 downloads and re-entered at number 38 on Country Digital Song Sales; "Take Me Home, Country Roads" rose 126% and "I Will Always Love You" surged 314% (both to approximately 2,000 downloads each).

== Music video ==
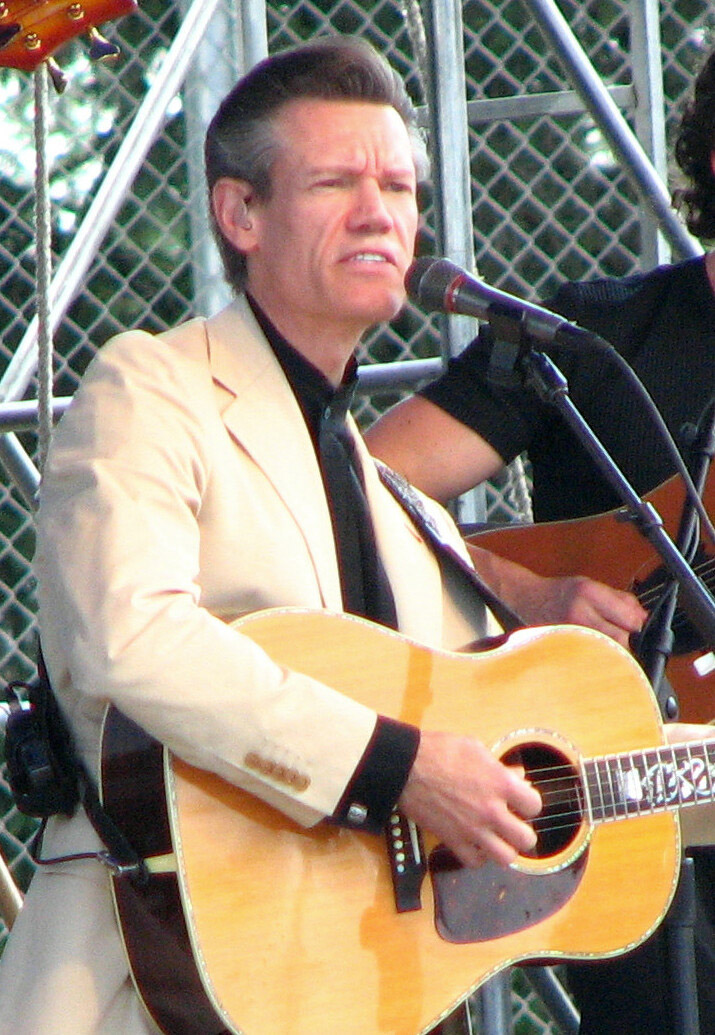
Randy Travis was the only artist who made a non-singing appearance in the video. A debilitating stroke Travis suffered in 2013 left him unable to participate in the song's recording.

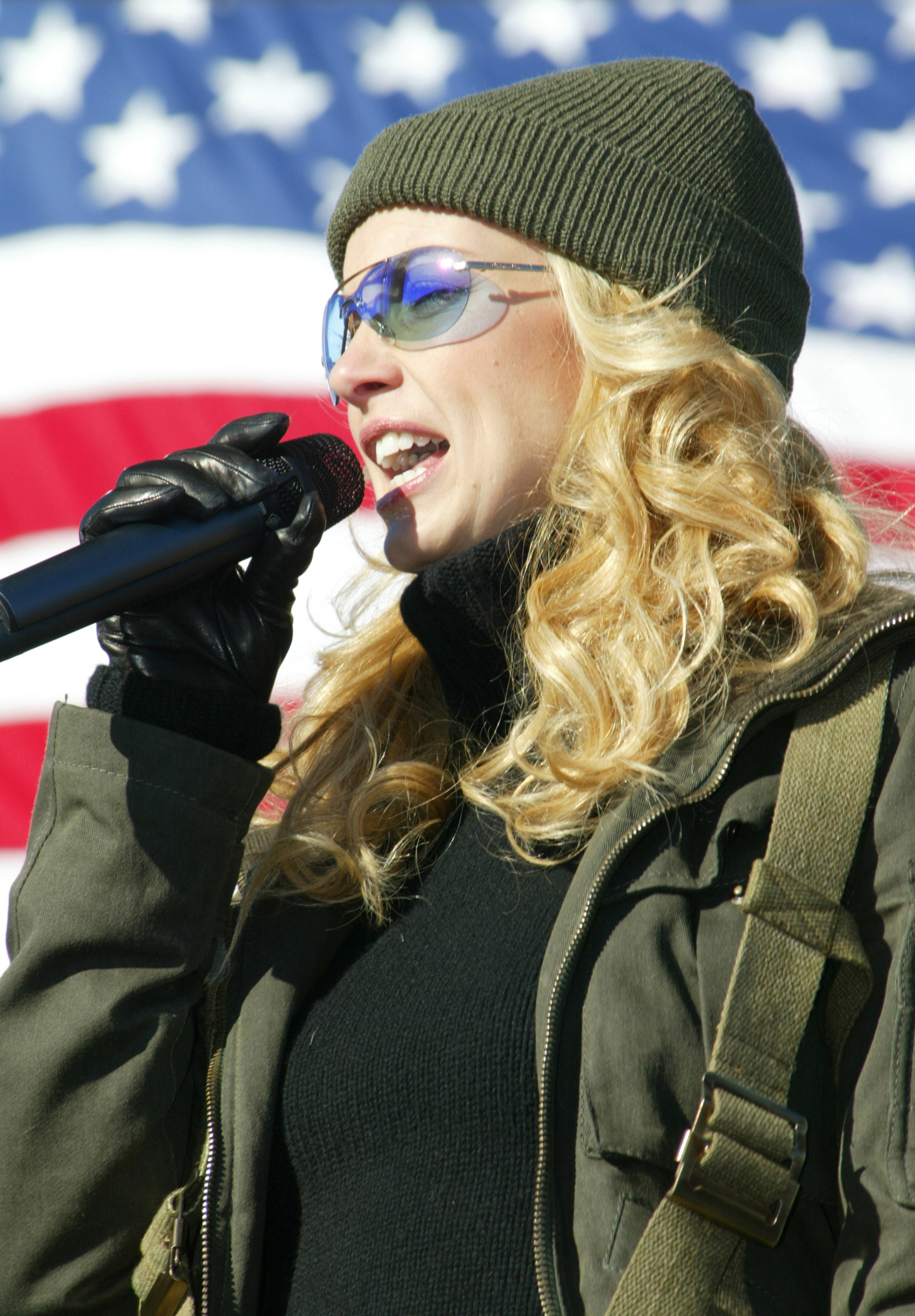
Faith Hill was the only other artist, besides Willie Nelson, who had previously worked with Kahn when he directed the video clip for her 2000 single, "The Way You Love Me".

Joseph Kahn directed the song's accompanying music video, which serves as a promotional teaser for the 50th CMA Awards ceremony and features all 30 artists involved performing in front of a green screen on which "graphics of railroad tracks transform into major cities and back again." Filming took place in Nashville, Tennessee, for three days in June 2016 during the CMA Music Festival. It marked the fourth time he directed a country music video after Willie Nelson's "Afraid" and “December Day” in 1994 and Faith Hill's "The Way You Love Me" in 2000 and the director's most star-studded video since Taylor Swift's "Bad Blood" which featured 15 artists. Houston-raised Kahn grew up listening to country music. McAnally said it was "an act of God" that everyone could make it to the recording and video shoot. The video was promoted as "the biggest video in country music history."

Kahn said he does not have a predilection for special effects-driven music videos and generally hates green-screen videos. He wanted the video to feel stylized but also organic, like the singers were actually in the places portrayed. It was a challenge due to time constraints. Because the song itself had three different melodies, he came up with the idea of layering the locations, where "you see them constructing and deconstructing and each leading naturally to the next." Kahn had to pre-visualize everything – where everyone was standing, how he was going to light it, how it would blend – and film it with plates. By the time the artists arrived to shoot their parts, everything was already pre-edited. Due to scheduling issues, he had to shoot all the artists separately and stitch them together at the end. Kahn said "the challenge is actually on different levels." He had to get all the artists represented in a very short period of time. He tried to avoid overdoing the visuals so they wouldn't get in the way of the artists; he wanted the artists to be the prime focus and not the visual effects. He said the next sociological and artistic challenge was melding the authenticity of old country with new country, which sounds like Top 40 pop. Both are very different and it was difficult to blend them together in a video and make everything feel contemporary and classic at the same time.

The video was expensive, like most of Kahn's previous works. When they presented the demo of the song and the budget to the board members, it was only after hearing the song that the members approved financing the project. McAnally admitted that at one point he grew wary and anxious due to the number of celebrities involved and the heft of the pricey budget. George Strait recorded his part and shot the video on the same day, which was the last day of production. He went to the recording studio in the morning, and then drove to the warehouse where some of the other artists were filming their shoots. McAnally recalls, "Literally as he's driving from the studio to the warehouse, we're dropping his voice in and sending a track over for him to (lip-synch) to."

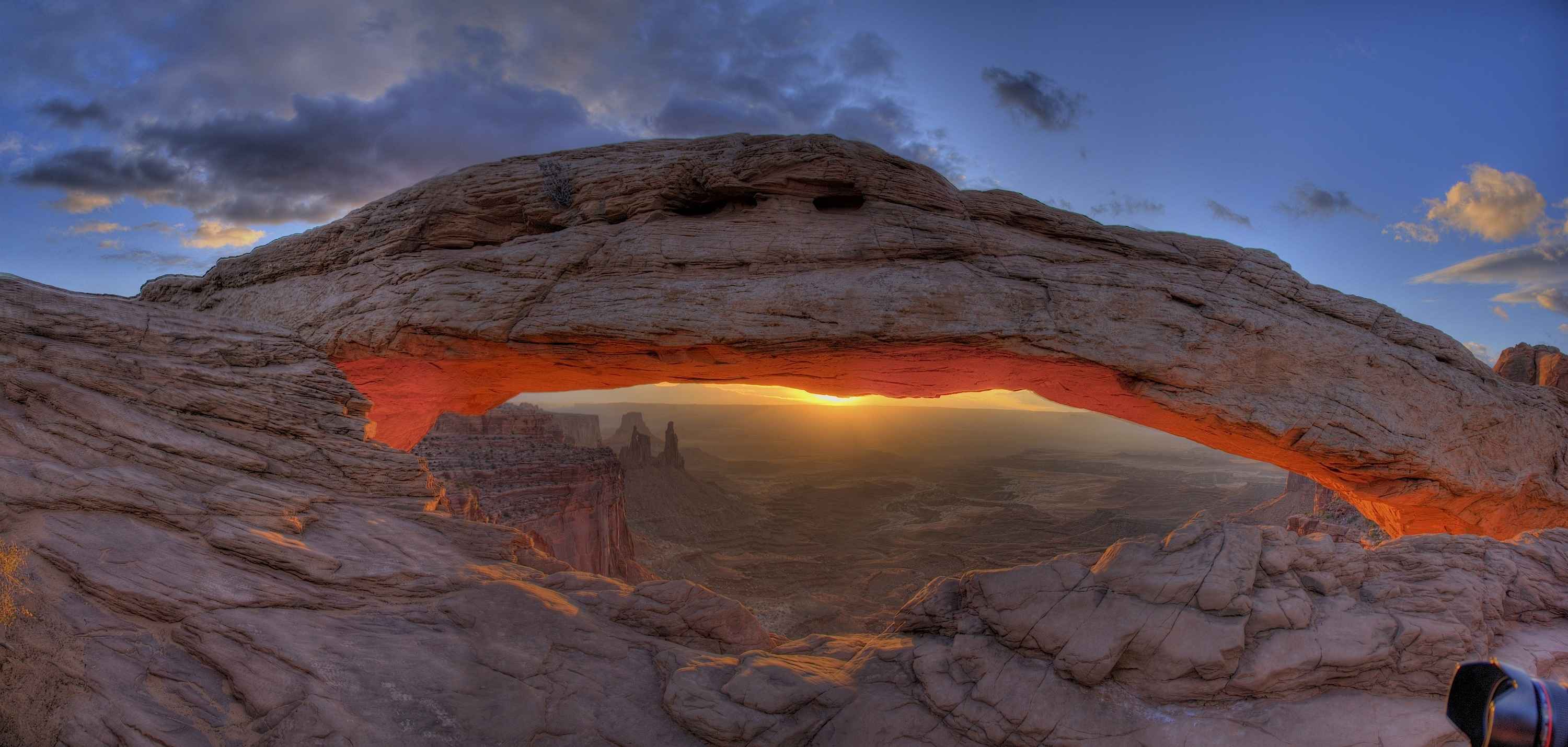
Mesa Arch in Canyonlands National Park, Utah, one of the many locations used in the video.

The video begins with Paisley gazing out a window as he sings the song's opening lyrics and closes with Parton singing in a field with the rest of the artists. In between, many country music stars can be seen singing, walking, and looking out across digitally-imposed landscapes like fields, farms, backroads, railroad tracks, famous locales like Nashville's Lower Broadway and international landmarks, including the Eiffel Tower, London and the Mesa Arch. According to CMA senior vice president of marketing and strategic partnerships Damon Whiteside, "the whole concept of the video is really about starting in Nashville and then really taking a tour around the world just to showcase that country music is everywhere; it's global."

On September 19, 2016, select members of the press, industry, and CMA board members got an exclusive first look at the video at Nashville's Belcourt Theatre. Director Joseph Kahn, producer Shane McAnally, and CMA board member Karen Fairchild (of Little Big Town) were present to share their experiences throughout the process, with a short panel led by Country Countdown USA host Lon Helton. Randy Travis, who was in attendance, received a round of applause for his participation and Fairchild thanked him for being a part of the project. A 90-second video premiered during ABC's Dancing With the Stars on September 20, after which viewers were redirected to www.forevercountry50.com to watch the full video.

Billboard said that the video contains "more special-effects scenarios in these four minutes as [sic] anything short of an Avatar sequel, albeit with churches, forests, and Ryman Auditorium standing in for other planets."

On April 2, 2017, the video won the 2016 ACM Award for "Video of the Year".

== Charts ==
=== Weekly charts ===
Weekly chart performance for "Forever Country"
Chart (2016)	Peak position
Australia (ARIA)	26
Canada (Canadian Hot 100)	25
Canada Country (Billboard)	34
Netherlands (Global Top 40)	34
New Zealand Heatseekers (Recorded Music NZ)	1
Scottish Singles Sales (Official Charts)	29
UK Singles Downloads (OCC)	58
UK Singles Sales (OCC)	55
US Billboard Hot 100	21
US Hot Country Songs (Billboard)	1
US Country Airplay (Billboard)	32

=== Year-end charts ===
Year-end chart performance for "Forever Country"
Chart (2016)	Position
Netherlands (Global Top 40)	93
US Hot Country Songs (Billboard)	75

== Certifications and sales ==
Certifications for "Forever Country"
Region	Certification	Certified units/sales
United States (RIAA)	Gold	500,000^{‡}
^{‡} Sales+streaming figures based on certification alone.
