= January Jones (disambiguation) =

January Jones (born 1978) is an American actress.

January Jones may also refer to:

- January Jones (singer), mid-20th century American pop singer
- "January Jones", a song by Johnny Carver on the 1974 album Please Don't Tell (That Sweet Ole Lady of Mine)
