= Johnny Carver (musician) =

American singer-songwriter

- Born: John David Carver; November 24, 1940 (age 85)
- Origin: Jackson, Mississippi U.S.
- Genres: Country
- Occupations: Singer; songwriter
- Instrument: Vocals
- Years active: 1959–present
- Labels: Imperial, Epic, ABC/Dot, Monument Records, United Artists Records
- Website: johnnycarver.com

John David Carver (born November 24, 1940) is an American country music artist. Between 1968 and 1977, he charted 15 Top 40 hits on the Billboard country chart. His highest-charting single was a cover of Tony Orlando's "Tie a Yellow Ribbon Round the Ole Oak Tree", a cover that reached No. 1 for him in 1974. He also had cover success with his version of the Starland Vocal Band's "Afternoon Delight." Carver lives today in rural Wilson County, Tennessee.

== Biography ==
=== Early life ===
Carver was born and grew up in a rural area near Jackson, Mississippi, United States, and sang in a local country gospel quartet with his family. He went on to form his own band, the Capital Cowboys, which were sponsored by an ice-cream company. Carver embarked on his first national tour in 1959, playing at clubs and fairs, and moved to Los Angeles in 1965, where he made regular appearances on local television and led the house band at the Palomino Club, with such performers as Buck Owens, Johnny Cash, Patsy Cline, Linda Ronstadt, The Flying Burrito Brothers, Hoyt Axton, Willie Nelson, Merle Haggard, and Jerry Lee Lewis.

=== Rise to fame ===
Carver was discovered by Del Shannon, who got Carver a deal with Imperial Records. His debut single for Imperial, was "Think About Her All The Time" b / w "One Way Or The Other" (Imperial 66173) in mid-1966. Both sides were written, produced and arranged by Shannon, who was a longtime fan of country music. Carver's composition "New Lips" was recorded by Roy Drusky in 1967. His self-titled debut album was released later that year, and contained the minor hit "Your Lily White Hands"; he had a few more modest successes with country pop offerings like 1968's "I Still Didn't Have the Sense to Go" and 1969's "That's Your Hang Up."

=== Later career ===
In 1972, he moved to ABC and had a major country hit with a version of Tony Orlando and Dawn's "Tie A Yellow Ribbon 'Round the Ole Oak Tree." A string of Top 40 country hits followed over the next five years, including the Top Tens "You Really Haven't Changed" (1973), "Don't Tell (That Sweet Old Lady of Mine)" (1974), and another country cover of a pop hit, the Starland Vocal Band's "Afternoon Delight" (1976). Carver's last Top 40 hit was 1977's "Living Next Door to Alice", and his final charting single was a 1981 cover of ABBA's "S.O.S." He subsequently became a regular performer in Branson, Missouri.

== Discography ==
=== Albums ===
Year	Album	US Country
1967	Really Country	—
1968	You're in Good Hands with Johnny Carver	31
1969	Leaving Again	41
1969	Sweet Wine/Hold Me Tight	—
1973	I Start Thinking About You	—
1973	Tie a Yellow Ribbon Around the Old Oak Tree	8
1974	Double Exposure	37
1974	Please Don't Tell (That Sweet Ole Lady of Mine)	23
1975	Strings	—
1976	Afternoon Delight	28
1977	The Best of Johnny Carver	46

=== Singles ===
Year	Single	Chart Positions		Album
Year	Single	US Country	CAN Country	Album
1968	"Your Lily White Hands"	21	—	You're in Good Hands with Johnny Carver
1968	"I Still Didn't Have the Sense to Go"	48	—	Leaving Again
1969	"Hold Me Tight"	32	—	Singles only
1969	"Sweet Wine"	26	—	Singles only
1969	"That's Your Hang Up"	41	—	Singles only
1970	"Willie and the Hand Jive"	43	—	Singles only
1970	"Harvey Harrington IV"	68	—	Singles only
1971	"If You See My Baby"	73	—	Singles only
1971	"If You Think That It's All Right"	34	—	I Start Thinking About You
1972	"I Start Thinking About You"	27	—	I Start Thinking About You
1972	"I Want You"	35	—	I Start Thinking About You
1973	"Yellow Ribbon"	5	1	Tie a Yellow Ribbon Around the Old Oak Tree
1973	"You Really Haven't Changed"	6	11	Tie a Yellow Ribbon Around the Old Oak Tree
1974	"Tonight Someone's Falling in Love"	12	19	Tie a Yellow Ribbon Around the Old Oak Tree
1974	"Country Lullabye"	27	—	Double Exposure
1974	"Don't Tell (That Sweet Ole Lady of Mine)"	10	47	Please Don't Tell (That Sweet Ole Lady of Mine)
1975	"January Jones"	39	—	Please Don't Tell (That Sweet Ole Lady of Mine)
1975	"Strings"	64	—	Strings
1975	"Start All Over Again"	74	—	Strings
1976	"Snap, Crackle and Pop"	77	—	Afternoon Delight
1976	"Afternoon Delight"	9	16	Afternoon Delight
1976	"Love Is Only Love (When Shared by Two)"	47	—	Afternoon Delight
1977	"Sweet City Woman"	48	—	Afternoon Delight
1977	"Living Next Door to Alice"	29	32	The Best of Johnny Carver
1977	"Down at the Pool"	36	—	Single only
1977	"Apartment"	72	—	You're in Good Hands with Johnny Carver
1980	"Fingertips"	90	—	Singles only
1981	"S.O.S."	73	—	Singles only

== Awards ==
Johnny Carver has received positive critical response, and has been given several awards:

- The Arkansas Traveler Award
- The Country Music Association (CMA) "Broader Acceptance & Progress of Country Music" Award
- The State of Mississippi Executive Department Merit Award
- The Broadcast Music Citation of Achievement Award
- Four American Society of Composers, Authors, and Publishers (ASCAP) Merit Awards
- Mississippi's First Number One Country Artist
- Mississippi's Annual "Johnny Carver Day"—August 10
