= 19th Annual Grammy Awards =

1977 US music awards ceremony

- Date: February 19, 1977
- Location: Hollywood Palladium, Los Angeles, California
- Hosted by: Andy Williams
- Most awards: Stevie Wonder (4)
- Most nominations: Stevie Wonder (7)

Television/radio coverage
- Network: CBS

The 19th Annual Grammy Awards were held on February 19, 1977, and were broadcast live on American television (CBS). It was the seventh and final year Andy Williams hosted the telecast. The ceremony recognized accomplishments by musicians from the year 1976.

Helen Hayes's win made her the second person to become an EGOT.

== Presenters ==
- The Oak Ridge Boys - Best Inspirational Performance
- Richard Pryor & George Benson - Best Jazz Vocal Performance
- Gladys Knight & The Pips
- Ringo Starr & Paul Williams - Best Pop Vocal Performance Female
- Bette Midler & Dinah Shore - Album of the Year
- Peter Frampton - Best R&B Duo/Group With Vocals
- The Jacksons - Best Female R&B Vocal Performance
- The Beach Boys - Best New Artist
- Dolly Parton & Freddy Fender - Best Country Instrumental Performance
- Pam Grier
- Barbra Streisand - Record of the Year

== Performers ==
- Natalie Cole - Mr. Melody
- Sarah Vaughan - Tenderly
- Chet Atkins & Les Paul - Deed I Do
- Barry Manilow - I Write the Songs
- Wild Cherry - Play That Funky Music
- Starland Vocal Band - Afternoon Delight
- Dolly Parton & Freddy Fender - Before the Next Teardrop Falls

== Winners and nominees ==
The following are the winners and nominees of the 19th annual Grammy Awards. Winners appear first and highlighted in bold.

=== General field ===
Record of the Year

- **"This Masquerade" - George Benson**
  - Tommy LiPuma, producer
- "If You Leave Me Now" - Chicago
  - James Guercio, producer
- "I Write the Songs" - Barry Manilow
  - Ron Dante & Barry Manilow, producers
- "Afternoon Delight" - Starland Vocal Band
  - Milton Okun, producer
- "50 Ways to Leave Your Lover" - Paul Simon
  - Phil Ramone & Paul Simon, producers

Album of the Year

- **Songs in the Key of Life - Stevie Wonder**
  - Stevie Wonder, producer
- Silk Degrees - Boz Scaggs
  - Joe Wissert, producer
- Frampton Comes Alive! - Peter Frampton
  - Peter Frampton, producer
- Chicago X - Chicago
  - James William Guercio, producer
- Breezin' - George Benson
  - Tommy LiPuma, producer

Song of the Year

- **"I Write the Songs"**
  - Bruce Johnston, songwriter (Barry Manilow)
- "This Masquerade"
  - Leon Russell, songwriter (George Benson)
- "The Wreck of the Edmund Fitzgerald"
  - Gordon Lightfoot, songwriter (Gordon Lightfoot)
- "Breaking Up Is Hard to Do"
  - Howard Greenfield & Neil Sedaka, songwriters (Neil Sedaka)
- "Afternoon Delight"
  - Bill Danoff, songwriter (Starland Vocal Band)

Best New Artist

- **Starland Vocal Band**
- Brothers Johnson
- Boston
- Wild Cherry
- Dr. Buzzard's Original Savannah Band

=== Children's ===
Best Recording for Children

- **Prokofiev: Peter and the Wolf/Saint-Saëns: Carnival of the Animals**
  - Karl Böhm & Hermione Gingold
- "Winnie The Pooh For President (Campaign Song)"
  - Larry Groce & Sterling Holloway
- "The Adventures of Ali and His Gang vs. Mr. Tooth Decay"
  - Muhammad Ali and His Gang
- "Snow White And The Seven Dwarfs"
  - Various Artists
- "Dickens' Christmas Carol"
  - Various Artists

=== Classical ===
Best Classical Orchestral Performance

- **Strauss: Also Sprach Zarathustra**
  - Chicago Symphony Orchestra - Georg Solti (conductor), Raymond Minshull (producer)
- The Fourth of July! (Ives: Symphony No. 2, Variations On America / Copland: Appalachian Spring / Bernstein: Overture to Candide / Gershwin: An American In Paris)
  - Los Angeles Philharmonic Orchestra
- Ravel: Daphnis Et Chloe (Complete Ballet)
  - Orchestre de Paris
- Gershwin: Rhapsody in Blue
  - New York Philharmonic
- Falla: Three Cornered Hat (Boulez Conducts Falla)
  - New York Philharmonic
- Elgar: Symphony No. 2 in E Flat Major
  - London Philharmonic
- Brahms: Symphony No. 1 in C Minor
  - Chicago Symphony Orchestra
- Berlioz: Symphonie Fantastique
  - Orchestre National de l'ORTF

Best Classical Vocal Soloist Performance

- **Beverly Sills**
  - Herbert: Music of Victor Herbert
- Dietrich Fischer-Dieskau
  - Wolf - Mörike-Lieder
- Marni Nixon
  - Schoenberg: Nine Early Songs; The Cabaret Songs of Arnold Schoenberg
- Margaret Price
  - Mozart: Arias (La Clemenza di Tito, Die Entfuhrung aus dem Serail, Nozze di Figaro etc)
- Janet Baker, James King
  - Mahler: Das Lied von der Erde
- Jan DeGaetani
  - Ives: Songs
- Carlo Bergonzi
  - Carlo Bergonzi Sings Verdi
- Barbra Streisand
  - Classical Barbra

Best Opera Recording

- **Gershwin: Porgy and Bess**
  - Cleveland Orchestra - Lorin Maazel (conductor), Michael Woolcock (producer)
- Verdi: Macbeth
  - La Scala Opera Orchestra & Chorus - Claudio Abbado (conductor), Rainer Brock (producer)
- Schoenberg: Moses Und Aaron
  - BBC Symphony Orchestra (BBC Symphony Singers & Orpheus Boys Choir) - Pierre Boulez (conductor), Paul Myers (producer)
- Massenet: Thaïs
  - New Philharmonia Orchestra (John Choir Alldis) - Lorin Maazel (conductor), Christopher Bishop (producer)
- Joplin: Treemonisha
  - Original Cast Orchestra & Chorus - Gunther Schuller (conductor), Tom Mowrey (producer)
- Bizet: Carmen
  - London Philharmonic - Georg Solti (conductor), Christopher Raeburn (producer)

Best Choral Performance (other than opera)

- **London Symphony Orchestra & Chorus - André Previn (conductor), Arthur Oldham (choirmaster)**
  - Rachmaninoff: The Bells
- Chorus of La Scala-Milan; Orchestra of La Scala-Milan - Claudio Abbado (conductor), Romano Gandolfi (choir director)
  - Verdi: Opera Choruses
- BBC Choral Society & BBC Symphony Singers; BBC Symphony Orchestra - Colin Davis (conductor)
  - Tippett: A Child of Our Time
- Choir of the Monks of Saint-Pierre de Solesmes Abbey - Dom Jean Claire (choir director)
  - Gregorian Chant
- Netherlands Radio Chorus; Rotterdam Philharmonic - Jean Fournet (conductor), Franz Muller (choir director)
  - Fauré: Requiem
- London Philharmonic Choir; Orchestra - Sir Adrian Boult (conductor)
  - Elgar: The Kingdom, Op. 51
- King's College Choir-Cambridge - Phillip Ledger (choir director)
  - Bernstein: Chichester Psalms/Britten: Rejoice in the Lamb
- Choeurs de Radio France; Orchestre National de France & Orchestre Philharmonique de Radio France - Leonard Bernstein (choir director)
  - Berlioz: Requiem
- New Philharmonia Chorus and London Philharmonic - Carlo Maria Giulini (conductor), Walter Hagen-Groll (choir director)
  - Beethoven: Missa Solemnis

Best Classical Performance, Instrumental Soloist or Soloists (with orchestra)

- Daniel Barenboim (conductor), Arthur Rubinstein & the London Philharmonic Orchestra for Beethoven: The Five Piano Concertos

Best Classical Performance, Instrumental Soloist or Soloists (without orchestra)

- Vladimir Horowitz for Horowitz Concerts 1975/76

Best Chamber Music Performance

- David Munrow (conductor) & the Early Music Consort of London for The Art of Courtly Love

Best Classical Album

- Max Wilcox (producer), Daniel Barenboim (conductor), Arthur Rubinstein & the London Philharmonic for Beethoven: The Five Piano Concertos

=== Comedy ===
Best Comedy Recording

- **Bicentennial Nigger - Richard Pryor**
- You Gotta Wash Your Ass - Redd Foxx
- Sleeping Beauty - Cheech & Chong
- Goodbye Pop - National Lampoon
- Bill Cosby Is Not Himself These Days - Rat Own, Rat Own, Rat Own - Bill Cosby

=== Composing and arranging ===
- Best Instrumental Composition
  - Chuck Mangione (composer) for Bellavia
- Album of Best Original Score Written for a Motion Picture or Television Special
  - Norman Whitfield (composer) for Car Wash performed by Rose Royce
- Best Instrumental Arrangement
  - Chick Corea (arranger) for "Leprechaun's Dream"
- Best Arrangement Accompanying Vocalist(s)
  - James William Guercio & Jimmie Haskell (arrangers) for "If You Leave Me Now" performed by Chicago
- Best Arrangement for Voices (duo, group or chorus)
  - Starland Vocal Band (arranger) for "Afternoon Delight"

=== Country ===
- Best Country Vocal Performance, Female
  - Emmylou Harris for Elite Hotel
- Best Country Vocal Performance, Male
  - Ronnie Milsap for "(I'm a) Stand By My Woman Man"
- Best Country Vocal Performance by a Duo or Group
  - Amazing Rhythm Aces for "The End Is Not in Sight (The Cowboy Tune)"
- Best Country Instrumental Performance
  - Chet Atkins & Les Paul for Chester and Lester
- Best Country Song
  - Larry Gatlin (songwriter) for "Broken Lady"

=== Folk ===
- Best Ethnic or Traditional Recording
  - John Hartford for Mark Twang

=== Gospel ===
- Best Gospel Performance (other than soul gospel)
  - The Oak Ridge Boys for "Where the Soul Never Dies"
- Best Soul Gospel Performance
  - Mahalia Jackson for How I Got Over
- Best Inspirational Performance
  - Gary S. Paxton for The Astonishing, Outrageous, Amazing, Incredible, Unbelievable, Different World of Gary S. Paxton

=== Jazz ===
- Best Jazz Performance by a Soloist (Instrumental)
  - Count Basie for Basie & Zoot
- Best Jazz Performance by a Group
  - Chick Corea for The Leprechaun
- Best Jazz Performance by a Big Band
  - Duke Ellington for The Ellington Suites
- Best Jazz Vocal Performance
  - Ella Fitzgerald for Fitzgerald and Pass... Again

=== Latin ===
- Best Latin Recording
  - Eddie Palmieri for Unfinished Masterpiece

=== Musical show ===
- Best Cast Show Album
  - Luigi Creatore & Hugo Peretti (producers) & various artists for Bubbling Brown Sugar

=== Packaging and notes ===
- Best Album Package
  - John Berg (art director) for Chicago X performed by Chicago
- Best Album Notes
  - Dan Morgenstern (notes writer) for The Changing Face of Harlem, the Savoy Sessions performed by Various Artists

=== Pop ===
- Best Pop Vocal Performance, Female
  - Hasten Down the Wind (album) - Linda Ronstadt
- Best Pop Vocal Performance, Male
  - Songs in the Key of Life (album) - Stevie Wonder
- Best Pop Vocal Performance by a Duo, Group or Chorus
  - "If You Leave Me Now" - Chicago
- Best Pop Instrumental Performance
  - Breezin' - George Benson

=== Production and engineering ===
- Best Engineered Recording, Non-Classical
  - Breezin' - Al Schmitt (engineer)
- Best Engineered Recording, Classical
  - Gershwin: Rhapsody in Blue - Edward (Bud) T. Graham, Milton Cherin, Ray Moore (engineers)
- Best Producer of the Year
  - Stevie Wonder

=== R&B ===
- Best R&B Vocal Performance, Female
  - Natalie Cole for "Sophisticated Lady (She's a Different Lady)"
- Best R&B Vocal Performance, Male
  - Stevie Wonder for "I Wish"
- Best R&B Vocal Performance by a Duo, Group or Chorus
  - Billy Davis Jr. & Marilyn McCoo for "You Don't Have to Be a Star (To Be in My Show)"
- Best R&B Instrumental Performance
  - George Benson for "Theme From Good King Bad"
- Best Rhythm & Blues Song
  - Boz Scaggs & David Paich (songwriters) for "Lowdown" performed by Boz Scaggs

=== Spoken ===
- Best Spoken Word Recording
  - Henry Fonda, Helen Hayes, James Earl Jones & Orson Welles for Great American Documents
