= Innuendo =

Suggestive remark

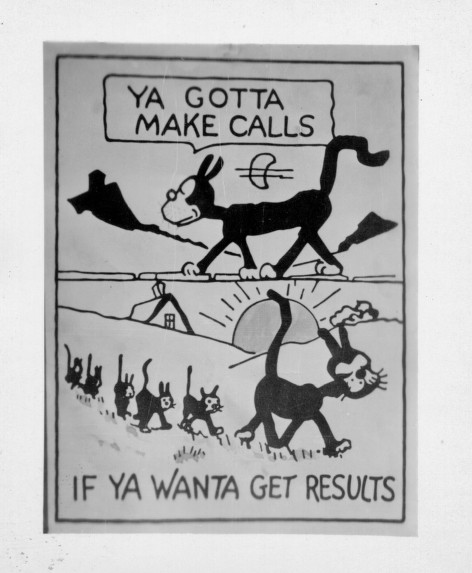
A male cat paying a "call" on a female cat, who then serves up kittens, insinuating that the "results" of children is contingent on a male "catcall"

An innuendo is a hint, insinuation or intimation about a person or thing, especially of a denigrating or derogatory nature. It can also be a remark or question, typically disparaging (also called insinuation), that works obliquely by allusion. In the latter sense, the intention is often to insult or accuse someone in such a way that one's words, taken literally, are innocent.

According to the Advanced Oxford Learner's Dictionary, an innuendo is "an indirect remark about somebody or something, usually suggesting something bad, mean or rude", such as: "innuendos about her private life" or "The song is full of sexual innuendo".

== Sexual innuendo ==
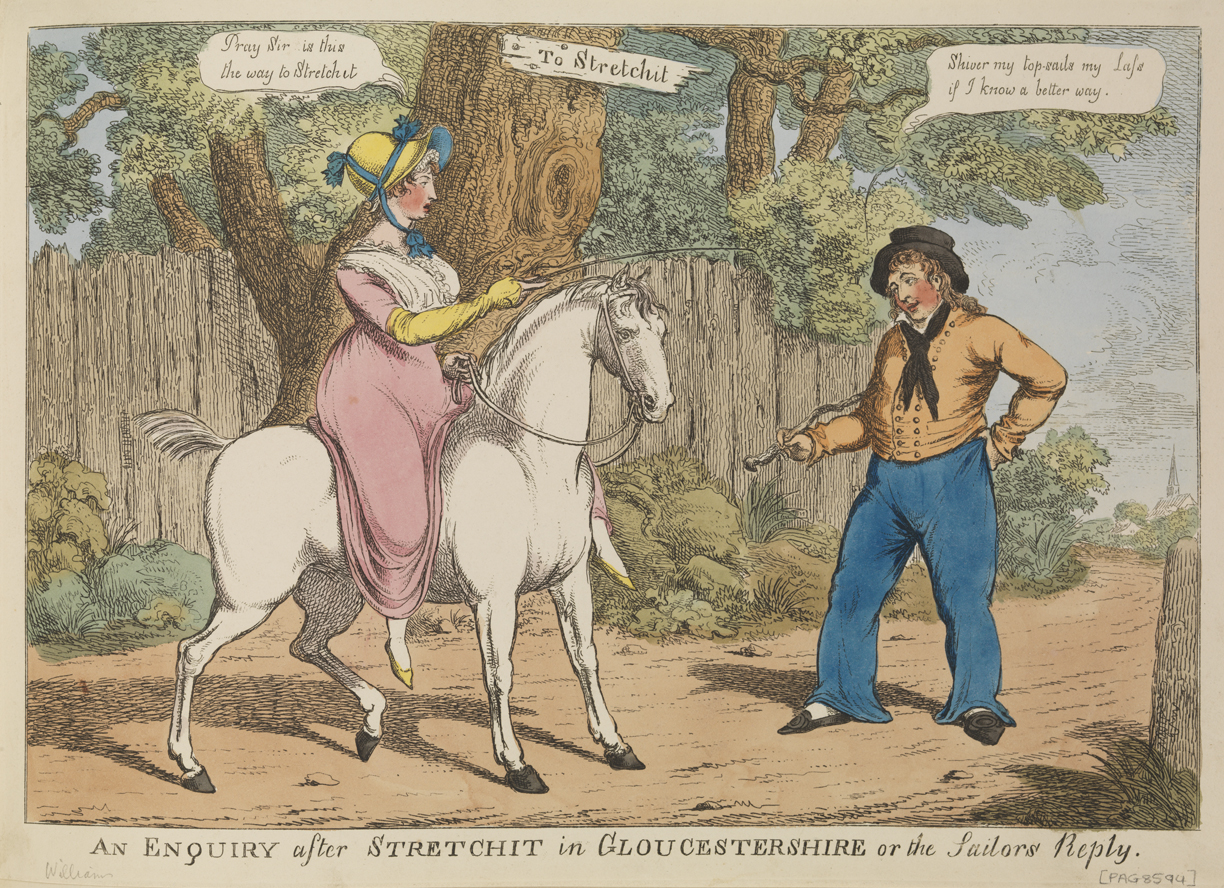
A cartoon using sexual innuendo to imply the lady is stretching her vagina by not riding sidesaddle

The term sexual innuendo has acquired a specific meaning, namely that of a "risqué" double entendre by playing on a possibly sexual interpretation of an otherwise innocent seeming phrase. For example, "We need to go deeper" can be seen as either a request for further inquiry, or allude to sexual activity. The 1970s hit song "Afternoon Delight" is often noted for sexual innuendo. Songwriter Bill Danoff said, "I didn't want to write an all-out sex song ... I just wanted to write something that was fun and hinted at sex."

== Defamation law ==
In the context of defamation law, an innuendo meaning is one which is not directly contained in the words that are illustrated, but which would be understood by those reading it based on specialized knowledge.

== Film, television, and other media ==
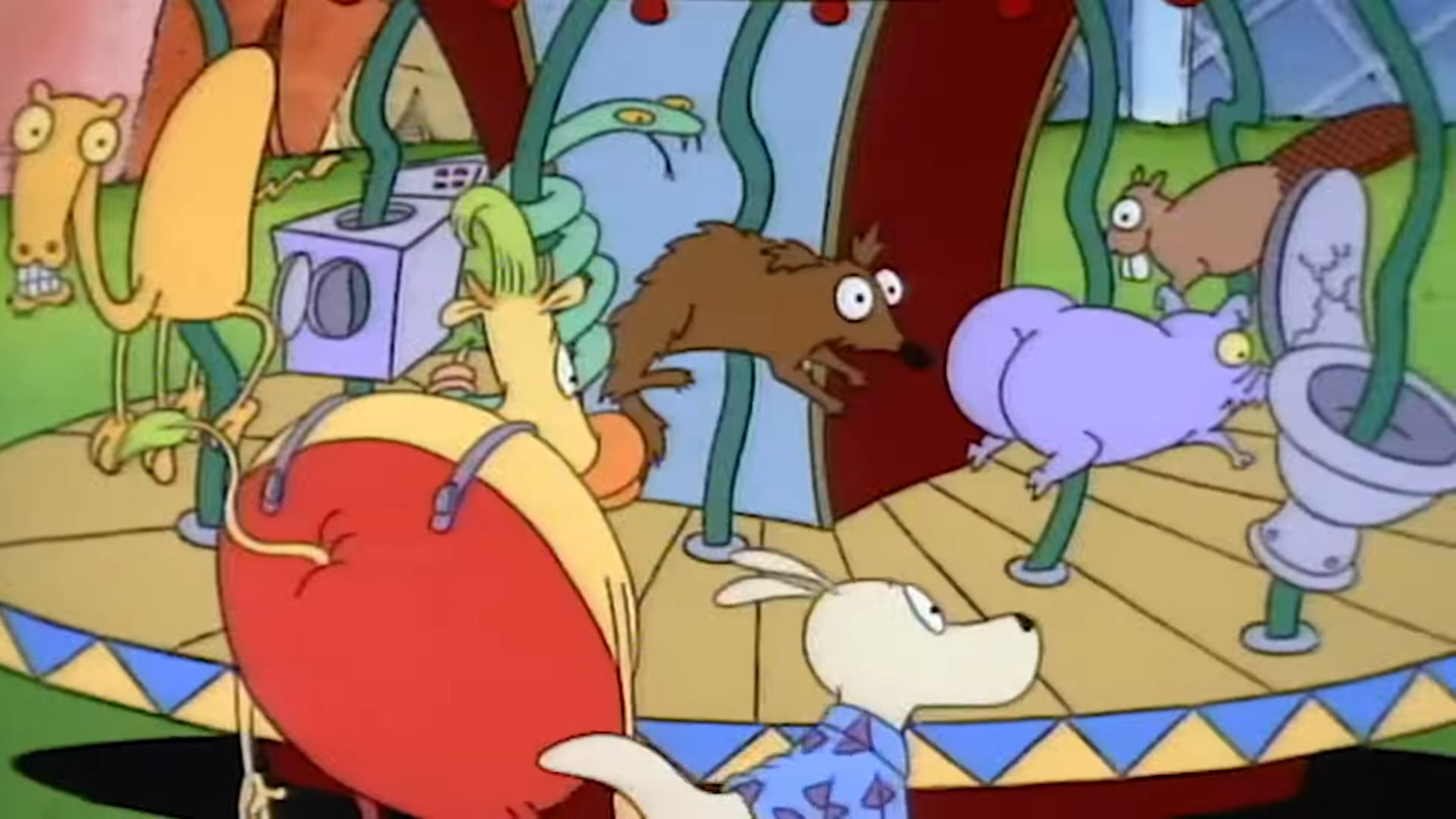
In the first episode of the Nickelodeon animated series, Rocko's Modern Life, a washing machine is displayed among multiple other unconventional carousel horses as a reference to female masturbation.

Comedy film scripts have used innuendo since the beginning of sound film itself. A notable example is the Carry On film series (1958–1992) in which innuendo was a staple feature, often including the title of the film itself. British sitcoms and comedy shows such as Are You Being Served? and Round the Horne have also made extensive use of innuendo. Mild sexual innuendo is a staple of British pantomime.

Numerous television programs and animated films targeted at child audiences often use innuendos in an attempt to entertain adolescent/adult audiences without exceeding their network's censorship policies. For example, Rocko's Modern Life employed numerous innuendos over its run, such as alluding to masturbation by naming the fictional fast food chain in the show "Chokey Chicken". Over 20 percent of the show's audience were adults as a result.

On The Scott Mills Show on BBC Radio 1, listeners are asked to send in clips from radio and TV with innuendos in a humorous context, a feature known as "Innuendo Bingo". Presenters and special guests fill their mouths with water and listen to the clips, and the last person to spit the water out with laughter wins the game.

== See also ==
- Blind item
- Doublespeak
- Euphemism
- Roman à clef
