= The Adventures of Ali and His Gang vs. Mr. Tooth Decay =

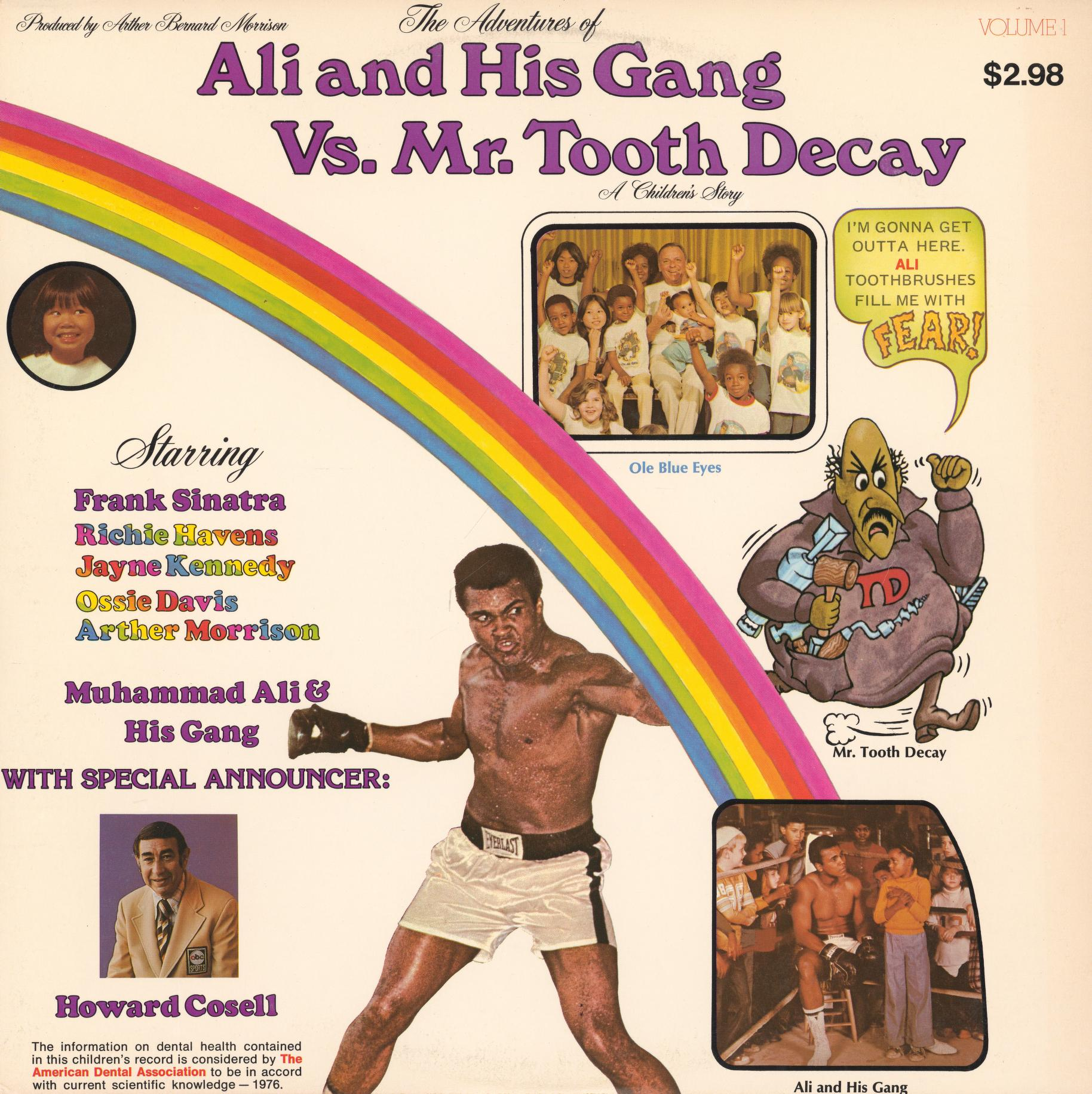

Studio album by Muhammad Ali
- Released: 1976
- Recorded: 1976
- Label: St. John's Fruit And Vegetable Co. ALI–1
- Producer: Arther Bernard Morrison

Muhammad Ali chronology
I Am the Greatest (1963)	The Adventures of Ali and His Gang vs. Mr. Tooth Decay (1976)	The Dope King's Last Stand (1977)

The Adventures of Ali and His Gang vs. Mr. Tooth Decay is a 1976 educational album by the American heavyweight boxer Muhammad Ali. The album was recorded to raise awareness of tooth decay among children. The album features several notable personalities including Howard Cosell, Frank Sinatra, and Ossie Davis. The album was recorded in the year of the United States Bicentennial, and makes several patriotic references to America's past including the Liberty Bell and Paul Revere.

It was nominated for the Grammy Award for Best Recording for Children at the 19th Annual Grammy Awards in 1977.; it lost to the Hermione Gingold and Karl Böhm album, "Prokofiev: Peter and the Wolf/Saint-Saëns:Carnival of the Animals" .

Ali also made a short film on children's dental hygiene, in which Mr Tooth Decay was played by Chuck Wepner. Ali later boxed against Mr. Tooth Decay during Dental Hygiene for Children Day in Washington, D.C. in January 1980.

The album was officially approved by the American Dental Association.

== Reception ==
Frank La Rosa, writing on the website "Frank's Vinyl Museum" said of the album that "I'd heard about this record years ago, and it sounded pretty good. I finally picked up a copy the other day, and – sweet jesus – this thing is better than anything I could have hoped for. It could be the single best record I own...A sugar high is nothing compared to what I felt listening to this treasure. One track isn't enough. You want to listen to the whole thing straight through, like I did, and you want to do it twice to catch all the details. Then you want to play it in your car. Your walkman. Your bathroom – while brushing and flossing your teeth, of course. One thing is for sure, I'll never look at ice cream the same way again."

Nate Petrin, writing in VICE magazine, was critical of the performance of the children on the album, feeling that "Fans of abysmal kid voice acting—including lots of opposite-of-spontaneous shouting things in unison as a substitute for actual emoting—will sink right into this record like a luxurious champagne bath".

Jason Heller, writing in Rolling Stone magazine, said of the music on the album:

At one point, the score sounds like a marching band whose horns have been replaced with glitching analog synths. Elsewhere, some misplaced, Shaft-style blaxploitation funk underlines the narration. At one point, Mr. Tooth Decay's entrance is signaled by a dissonant track that sounds like "You're a Mean One, Mr. Grinch" as interpreted by avant-garde composer Edgard Varèse. The most successful song on the album is Ali's own theme, a brassy, fist-pumping anthem that vaguely parallels the theme from Rocky, also released in 1976

== Plot ==
The album opens with "Ali's Historical Theme Song", a musical number featuring Ali, before the story (narrated by Howard Cosell) begins. The plot of the story involves Ali training for an upcoming fight against "Mr. Tooth Decay", who is accompanied by sidekicks, Sugar Cuber and Willie Plaque. Ali then rescues a group of children from buying ice cream from a shopkeeper (played by Frank Sinatra), and takes the children to an organic farm where they learn the importance of drinking milk and eating fruit and vegetables from farmer Brother St. John (played by Ossie Davis). The album concludes with the fight between Ali and Mr. Tooth Decay.

== Personnel ==
- Arther Bernard Morrison – producer, voice, writer
- Dick Lavsky, James Bedford, Michael Bitterman, Stan Peahota – musical arranger
- Sharinn Sigman – graphics
- Ellen Fox – illustration, art direction
- Sonia Katchian, Victor Pope – photography
- Howard Cosell – special announcer
- Beverly McCloud, Frank Sinatra, Jayne Kennedy, Karen Hall, Ossie Davis, Richie Havens – voice
- Esther Taylor-Evans – writer

== See also ==
- I Am the Greatest (1963 album)
