= Take Me Home, Country Roads =

1971 single by John Denver

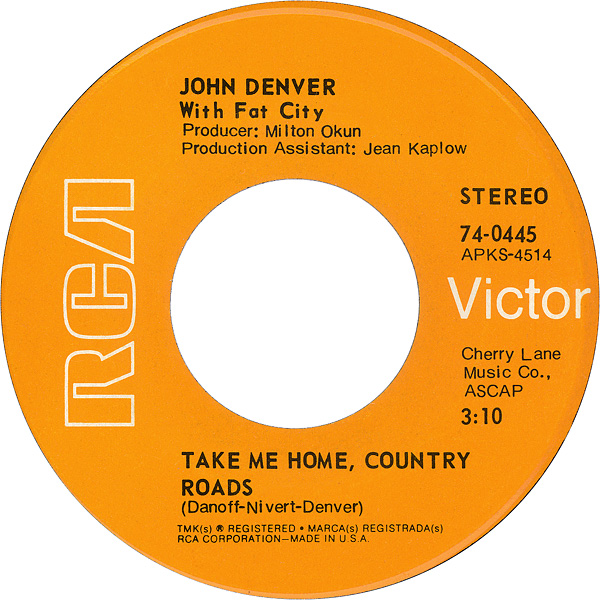
- Side A of the US single

Single by John Denver

from the album Poems, Prayers & Promises
- B-side: "Poems, Prayers and Promises"
- Released: April 12, 1971
- Recorded: January 1971, New York City
- Genre: Country; folk
- Length: 3:10
- Label: RCA
- Songwriters: Bill Danoff; Taffy Nivert; John Denver
- Producers: Milt Okun; Susan Ruskin

John Denver singles chronology
"Friends with You" (1971)	"Take Me Home, Country Roads" (1971)	"Everyday" (1972)

Audio video
- "Take Me Home, Country Roads" on YouTube

"Take Me Home, Country Roads", also known simply as "Country Roads", is a song written by Bill Danoff, Taffy Nivert, and John Denver. Denver released it as a single on April 12, 1971, and the song peaked at number two on Billboard's US Hot 100 singles chart for the week ending August 28. "Take Me Home, Country Roads" was a success on its initial release and was certified gold by the RIAA on August 18, 1971, and platinum on April 10, 2017. It became one of Denver's most popular songs and has continued to sell, with over 1.8 million digital copies sold in the United States.

The song has become a popular symbol of West Virginia, which is mentioned in the first verse. In March 2014, it became one of four of the state's official anthems.

Denver's 1971 recording was inducted into the Grammy Hall of Fame in 1998, and was selected by the Library of Congress for inclusion in the National Recording Registry in 2023.

== Composition ==
Inspiration for the title line had come while Taffy Nivert and Bill Danoff, who were married, were driving along Clopper Road in Montgomery County, Maryland, to a gathering of Nivert's family in Gaithersburg, with Nivert behind the wheel while Danoff played his guitar. Danoff stated: "I just started thinking, country roads, I started thinking of me growing up in western New England and going on all these small roads. It didn't have anything to do with Maryland or anyplace."

To Danoff, the lyric "the radio reminds me of my home far away" in the bridge is quintessentially West Virginian, an allusion to when he listened to the program Saturday Night Jamboree, broadcast from Wheeling, West Virginia, on WWVA at his home in Springfield, Massachusetts, during his childhood in the 1950s.

Danoff was influenced by friend and West Virginian actor Chris Sarandon and members of a West Virginia commune who attended Danoff's performances. Of the commune members, Danoff remarked, "They brought their dogs and were a very colorful group of folks, but that is how West Virginia began creeping into the song." While the song was inspired by Danoff's upbringing in Springfield, Massachusetts, he "didn't want to write about Massachusetts because [he] didn't think the word was musical."

Starting on December 22, 1970, Denver was heading the New Year's bill at The Cellar Door in Washington, D.C., with Fat City (which consisted of Nivert and Danoff) opening for him, just as Denver had opened at the same club for then-headliner David Steinberg. After the club's post-Christmas reopening night on Tuesday, December 29 (Cellar Door engagements ran from Tuesday to Sunday, and this booking was for two weeks), the three returned to the couple's apartment for an impromptu jam. On the way, Denver's left thumb was broken in a collision. He was rushed to the emergency room, where the thumb was splinted. When they returned to the apartment, Denver said he was "wired, you know."

When Danoff and Nivert ran through what they had of the song they had been working on for about a month, planning to sell to Johnny Cash, Denver decided he had to have it, which prompted them to abandon plans for the sale. The verses and chorus were still missing a bridge, so the three of them went about finishing.

Nivert got out an encyclopedia to learn more about West Virginia. The first thing she encountered was the rhododendron, the state flower, so she kept trying to work the word rhododendron into the song. "Rhododendron" was the title that Nivert had written down on the lyric sheet, which they later sent to ASCAP. The three stayed up until 6:00 a.m., changing words and moving lines around.

When they finished on the morning of December 30, 1970, the day before Denver's 27th birthday, he announced that the song had to go on his next album. Later that night, during Denver's first set, Denver called his two collaborators back to the spotlight, where the trio changed their career trajectories, reading the lyrics from a single, handheld, unfolded piece of paper. According to Len Jaffe, a Washington, DC-based singer-songwriter who attended the show where Denver premiered the song, this resulted in a five-minute standing ovation. They recorded it in New York City in January 1971.

"Take Me Home, Country Roads" is written in the key of A major with a tempo of 82 beats per minute.

== Commercial performance and legacy ==
"Take Me Home, Country Roads" appeared on the LP Poems, Prayers & Promises and was released as a 45 in the spring of 1971. Original pressings credited the single to "John Denver with Fat City". It broke nationally in mid-April, but moved up the charts very slowly. The single reached number one on the Record World Pop Singles Chart and the Cash Box Top 100, and number two on the US Billboard Hot 100, topped only by "How Can You Mend a Broken Heart" by the Bee Gees.

On August 18, 1971, the song was certified Gold by the RIAA for a million copies shipped. It continued to sell in the digital era, and as of January 2020, the song has also sold 1,800,000 downloads since it became available digitally.

Denver's recording of "Take Me Home, Country Roads" was selected by the Library of Congress for preservation in the National Recording Registry in 2023.

The song has become popular at sporting events, including games of the Brisbane Lions Australian rules football club, The song has since become an anthem of the Brisbane Lions and is sung by the crowd every time Lions player Charlie Cameron (footballer, born 1994) kicks a goal. The song was chosen by Cameron to be played in reference to his country roots. Also at the NFL International Series games held in Germany, the United States national soccer team's games, and Manchester United matches. Danoff and Denver's family approved of the U.S. national team adopting "Take Me Home, Country Roads" as an anthem during the 2026 FIFA World Cup, the latter describing the song's "simple, clear, and relatable" lyrics as easy to sing and resonant with soccer fans regardless of geography.

The song was interpolated in "Lonely Road" by Machine Gun Kelly and Jelly Roll in 2024. It reached number 33 on the Billboard Hot 100 chart dated August 10, 2024, giving Denver his first top-40 appearance as a songwriter since the same song's appearance in the medley "Forever Country" by Artists of Then, Now & Forever peaked at number 21 in 2016.

== Reception in West Virginia ==
Take Me Home, Country Roads
- Regional anthem of West Virginia
- Lyrics: Bill Danoff and Taffy Nivert
- Published: April 12, 1971
- Adopted: March 2014

"Take Me Home, Country Roads" received an enthusiastic response from West Virginians. On November 1, 2017, the West Virginia Tourism Office announced it had obtained the rights to use "Take Me Home, Country Roads" in its marketing efforts. West Virginia Tourism Commissioner Chelsea Ruby stated: "'Country Roads' has become synonymous with West Virginia all over the world. It highlights everything we love about our state: scenic beauty, majestic mountains, a timeless way of life, and most of all, the warmth of a place that feels like home whether you've lived here forever or are just coming to visit." The opening phrase of the song, "Almost heaven", became a primary tourism office slogan.

The song is the theme song of West Virginia University, and it has been performed during every home football pregame show since 1972. The song is also played after every home victory and fans are encouraged to stay in the stands and sing along with the team. It is also played for other athletic events and university functions. On September 6, 1980, at the invitation of West Virginia Governor Jay Rockefeller, songwriters Danoff, Nivert, and Denver performed the song during pregame festivities to a sold-out crowd at the opening of Mountaineer Field.

The popularity of the song inspired resolutions in the West Virginia Legislature to adopt "Take Me Home, Country Roads" as an official state song. On March 7, 2014, the West Virginia Legislature approved a resolution to make "Take Me Home, Country Roads" an official state song of West Virginia, alongside three other pieces: "West Virginia Hills", "This Is My West Virginia", and "West Virginia, My Home Sweet Home". The next day, governor Earl Ray Tomblin signed the resolution into law.

The song was played at the funeral for West Virginia Senator Robert Byrd at the state capitol in Charleston, West Virginia, on July 2, 2010.

== Personnel ==
- John Denver – vocals, 6- and 12-string acoustic guitar
- Bill Danoff – backing vocals
- Taffy Nivert – backing vocals
- Eric Weissberg – banjo, steel guitar
- Mike Taylor – acoustic guitar
- Richard Kniss – double bass
- Gary Chester – drums, percussion

== Charts ==
=== Weekly charts ===
1971 weekly chart performance for "Take Me Home, Country Roads"
Chart (1971)	Peak position
Australia (Kent Music Report)	24
Canada Adult Contemporary (RPM)	5
Canada Country Singles (RPM)	17
Canada Top Singles (RPM)	3
New Zealand (Listener)	5
US Adult Contemporary (Billboard)	3
US Billboard Hot 100	2
US Hot Country Singles (Billboard)	50

2025–2026 weekly chart performance for "Take Me Home, Country Roads"
Chart (2025–2026)	Peak position
Global 200 (Billboard)	140
Israel International Airplay (Media Forest)	17

=== Year-end charts ===
Year-end chart performance for "Take Me Home, Country Roads"
Chart (1971)	Position
Canada Top Singles (RPM)	40
US Billboard Hot 100	8

== Certifications ==
Certifications and sales for "Take Me Home, Country Roads"
Region	Certification	Certified units/sales
Denmark (IFPI Danmark)	Gold	45,000^{‡}
Germany (BVMI)	Gold	250,000^{‡}
Italy (FIMI)	Platinum	100,000^{‡}
New Zealand (RMNZ)	5× Platinum	150,000^{‡}
Spain (Promusicae)	Gold	30,000^{‡}
United Kingdom (BPI)	2× Platinum	1,200,000^{‡}
United States (RIAA)	Platinum	1,800,000
^{‡} Sales+streaming figures based on certification alone.

== Cover versions ==
=== Olivia Newton-John version ===
Olivia Newton-John released a cover version in January 1973 that reached number 6 in Japan and number 15 in the UK. It was the lead single from her third studio album, Let Me Be There. This version, as well as the song itself, features prominently in the Japanese animated film, Whisper of the Heart.

==== Charts ====
Chart performance for "Take Me Home, Country Roads"
Chart (1972)	Peak position
Ireland (IRMA)	5
Israel (Israeli Singles Chart)	25
UK Singles (Official Charts)	15
US Billboard Bubbling Under Hot 100	119

=== Toots and the Maytals version ===
Jamaican reggae group Toots and the Maytals recorded a cover version for their 1974 album In the Dark. The lyrics are altered slightly to refer to the group's home country of Jamaica with specific references to the island's West end.

=== Yōko Honna version ===
"Country Road"

Single by Yōko Honna
- B-side: "The Window in Half"
- Released: June 25, 1995
- Length: 4:24
- Label: Tokuma Japan Communications
- Songwriters: Bill Danoff; Taffy Nivert; John Denver; Mamiko Suzuki; Hayao Miyazaki (complement)

Japanese voice actress Yōko Honna recorded a cover version for the 1995 film Whisper of the Heart simply titled "Country Road" with new lyrics by Mamiko Suzuki, the daughter of Studio Ghibli producer Toshio Suzuki, and screenwriter Hayao Miyazaki. The Olivia Newton-John version of the song also plays during the film's opening credits.

No.	Title	Length
1.	"Country Road"	4:24
2.	"The Window in Half"	3:15
3.	"Country Road (Instrumental)"	4:24

=== Hermes House Band version ===
"Country Roads"

Single by Hermes House Band

from the album The Album
- Released: May 21, 2001
- Length: 3:22
- Label: XPLO Music
- Songwriters: Bill Danoff; Taffy Nivert; John Denver
- Producers: Jim Binapfl; John Lehmkuhl; Mark Snijders; Jack Buck

Hermes House Band singles chronology
"Disco Samba Part II" (2000)	"Country Roads" (2001)	"Que Sera Sera" (2001)

Dutch pop band Hermes House Band covered the song and released it as "Country Roads". This version was first released in Germany on May 21, 2001, and was issued in the United Kingdom on December 3, 2001, where it was a contender for the 2001 Christmas number-one single. This version was a chart success in Europe, reaching number one in Scotland, number two in Germany and Ireland, and the top 10 in Austria, Denmark, and the United Kingdom.

==== Track listings ====
Dutch CD single
No.	Title	Length
1.	"Country Roads" (original radio edit)	3:22
2.	"Country Roads" (happy dance version)	3:20

Belgian CD single
No.	Title	Length
1.	"Country Roads" (original radio edit)	3:22
2.	"Country Roads" (happy dance version)	3:20
3.	"Country Roads" (karaoke version)	3:20

European and Australian maxi-CD single
No.	Title	Length
1.	"Country Roads" (original live radio version)	3:22
2.	"Country Roads" (original radio version)	3:22
3.	"Country Roads" (dance radio version)	3:20
4.	"Country Roads" (happy party radio version)	3:20
5.	"Country Roads" (original live extended version)	4:24
6.	"Country Roads" (dance extended version)	4:14
7.	"Country Roads" (happy party extended version)	4:26

UK CD single
No.	Title	Length
1.	"Country Roads" (original radio version)	3:22
2.	"Country Roads" (original live extended version)	4:24
3.	"Country Roads" (dance extended version)	4:14
4.	"Country Roads" (video)	3:22

UK cassette single
No.	Title	Length
1.	"Country Roads" (original radio version)	3:22
2.	"Country Roads" (original live extended version)	4:24
3.	"Country Roads" (original dance extended version)	4:14

==== Charts ====
Weekly chart performance for "Country Roads"
Chart (2001)	Peak position
Austria (Ö3 Austria Top 40)	4
Belgium (Ultratop 50 Flanders)	23
Denmark (Tracklisten)	5
Europe (Eurochart Hot 100)	21
Germany (GfK)	2
Ireland (IRMA)	2
Ireland Dance (IRMA)	1
Netherlands (Dutch Top 40)	27
Netherlands (Single Top 100)	17
Scottish Singles Sales (Official Charts)	1
Sweden (Sverigetopplistan)	60
Switzerland (Schweizer Hitparade)	35
UK Singles (Official Charts)	7

2001 year-end chart performance for "Country Roads"
Chart (2001)	Position
Austria (Ö3 Austria Top 40)	18
Europe (Eurochart Hot 100)	96
Germany (Media Control)	10
Ireland (IRMA)	20
UK Singles (OCC)	121

2002 year-end chart performance for "Country Roads"
Chart (2002)	Position
Ireland (IRMA)	81

==== Certifications ====
Certifications and sales for "Country Roads"
Region	Certification	Certified units/sales
Denmark (IFPI Danmark)	Gold	45,000^{‡}
Germany (BVMI)	Platinum	500,000^{^}
United Kingdom (BPI)	Silver	200,000^{‡}
^{^} Shipments figures based on certification alone.^{‡} Sales+streaming figures based on certification alone.

=== Forever Country version ===
The song found further chart success as part of the "Forever Country" medley and video, created in 2016 to celebrate the 50th anniversary of the Country Music Association Awards.

=== Fallout 76 version ===
A cover version of the song, a collaboration between Copilot Music and Sound and the vocal group Spank, was commissioned for and featured in both the teaser and full E3 2018 trailers for the 2018 video game Fallout 76, with its plot events set in West Virginia. Released as an iTunes-only single on July 4, 2018, the song reached No. 1 on the iTunes singles chart. It debuted at No. 41 on Billboard's Hot Country Songs chart that week and at No. 21 on Billboard's Country Digital Songs the following week. The official YouTube upload of the original John Denver recording, initially uploaded in 2013, would later edit its description in response to the song's use for the game. In Australia, a promotional Fallout 76 vinyl featuring the cover was included with the December 2018 issue of STACK Magazine exclusively from retailer JB Hi-Fi.

==== Charts ====
Chart performance for "Take Me Home, Country Roads"
Chart (2018)	Peak position
US Country Digital Songs (Billboard)	21
US Hot Country Songs (Billboard)	41

=== Lana Del Rey version ===
"Take Me Home, Country Roads"

Promotional single by Lana Del Rey
- Released: December 1, 2023
- Genre: Country; folk
- Length: 2:46
- Label: Interscope; Polydor
- Songwriters: Bill Danoff; Taffy Nivert; John Denver
- Producer: Zach Dawes

Lana Del Rey promotional singles chronology
"Text Book" (2021)	"Take Me Home, Country Roads" (2023)

Official audio
- "Take Me Home, Country Roads" on YouTube

American singer-songwriter Lana Del Rey released a piano cover of the song on December 1, 2023.

==== Charts ====
Chart performance for "Take Me Home, Country Roads"
Chart (2023)	Peak position
Ireland (IRMA)	96
UK Singles Downloads (Official Charts)	49
US Hot Rock & Alternative Songs (Billboard)	23
