= Windsong Records =

A number of record labels have traded under the name Windsong Records, including:

- Windstar Records – originally known as Windsong Records, Colorado based record label responsible for releasing John Denver recordings.
- Windsong International Records – UK based record label responsible for releasing BBC Radio 1 recordings.
