= I Am the Greatest (Cassius Clay album) =

Studio album by Cassius Clay
- Released: August 1963
- Recorded: 1963
- Studio: CBS 30th Street Studio
- Genre: Spoken word
- Length: 45:11
- Label: Columbia Records

Cassius Clay chronology
I Am the Greatest (1963)	The Adventures of Ali and His Gang vs. Mr. Tooth Decay (1976)

Singles from I Am the Greatest
- 1. "I Am the Greatest" / "Will the Real Sonny Liston Please Fall Down" Released: 1964; 2. "Stand by Me" / "I Am the Greatest" Released: 1964

I Am the Greatest is a comedy album by boxer Cassius Clay, released in August 1963 – six months before he won the world heavyweight championship, publicly announced his conversion to Islam, and changed his name to Muhammad Ali. It was released by Columbia/CBS. The album helped establish Ali's reputation as an eloquently poetic "trash talker". The album has also been identified as an early example of hip hop music.

== Overview ==
The liner notes were written by the American poet Marianne Moore, a longstanding fan of Clay. Clay collaborated on the writing for the album with the comedy writer Gary Belkin, who was listed as producer on the original release and later as a co-writer in a 1999 re-release. Belkin would later claim he had largely ghost-written the works, although Belkin's assertions have been disputed (e.g., by George Plimpton and David Remnick). The album idea had been proposed to Clay by the William Morris Agency, and the recording was conducted at Columbia Records' 30th Street New York Studio before an audience of 200 people.

Rather than being listed as "tracks", the first 8 entries on the album were listed with "rounds" numbers, and Billboard duly noted that Clay claimed he would beat Sonny Liston in 8 rounds. Although Clay's remarks were treated skeptically at the time as mere promotional bragging, when the Liston fight was held the following February, Clay won in a major upset when Liston gave up after only 6 rounds. Clay had proved tougher than expected from the beginning, and he began to dominate the fight in the third round. Despite being nearly blinded in the fourth round – apparently by an ointment used on a cut on Liston's face – Clay recovered, and by the end of the sixth round he was landing blow-after-blow in combinations, almost at will. At the opening of the seventh round, Liston spat out his mouth guard and refused to rise to continue.

On the day after the fight, it was disclosed that Clay had joined the Nation of Islam (which was confirmed by Clay himself the following day), and a week later its leader Elijah Muhammad announced that Clay would change his name to Muhammad Ali.

Following his upset victory and other major news, there was a surge in demand for the LP of the previous August. To take advantage of the moment, the title track "I Am the Greatest" was also released as a single, with the B-side "Will the Real Sonny Liston Please Fall Down". The phenomenon became a significant event in the musical culture that year. "I Am the Greatest" was also released as a single with Clay singing his cover of the Ben E. King song "Stand by Me", which resurfaced on CD in 1991 as part of the compilation Golden Throats 2: More Celebrity Rock Oddities.

After later controversy, Columbia pulled the LP and single from stores. Ali did not make another record until he teamed up with Frank Sinatra and Howard Cosell to record The Adventures of Ali and His Gang vs. Mr. Tooth Decay in 1976.

The album was re-released on CD on June 6, 2016.

== Reception and legacy ==
Professional ratings
Review scores
Source	Rating
Record Mirror	3/5 stars

I Am the Greatest was nominated for the Grammy Award for Best Comedy Performance at the 6th Annual Grammy Awards in 1964; it lost to Allan Sherman's song "Hello Muddah, Hello Fadduh (A Letter from Camp)".

I Am the Greatest reached number 61 on the album chart, and sold 500,000 copies in the United States. Certain tracks on the album have been identified as rap music, such as "Will the Real Sonny Liston Please Fall Down", which is identified as the first rap battle track. I Am the Greatest is considered a precursor of hip hop music, with Muhammad Ali's impact on hip hop well documented.

== Track listing ==
The LP consists of monologues and poems devoted mainly to Clay himself.

Side one
No.	Title	Length
1.	"Round 1: I Am the Greatest"	3:25
2.	"Round 2: I Am the Double Greatest"	4:33
3.	"Round 3: Do You Have to Ask?"	3:41
4.	"Round 4: 'I Have Written a Drama', He Said Playfully"	7:07
Total length:		18:46

Side two
No.	Title	Length
1.	"Round 5: Will the Real Sonny Liston Please Fall Down"	4:38
2.	"Round 6: Funny You Should Ask"	2:40
3.	"Round 7: 2138"	4:07
4.	"Round 8: The Knockout"	4:05
5.	"Afterpiece (see Round 1)"	3:27
Total length:		18:57

1999 re-release bonus tracks
No.	Title	Length
10.	"I Am the Greatest"	2:13
11.	"Stand by Me"	2:11
12.	"The Gang's All Here"	3:04
Total length:		7:28
