= Afternoon Delight =

1976 single by Starland Vocal Band

Single by Starland Vocal Band

from the album Starland Vocal Band
- B-side: "Starland"
- Released: April 1976
- Recorded: November 1975
- Genre: Soft rock; country rock; folk-pop
- Length: 3:12
- Label: Windsong (US); Windlands International (UK & Canada)
- Songwriter: Bill Danoff
- Producer: Milt Okun

Starland Vocal Band singles chronology
"Afternoon Delight" (1976)	"California Day" (1976)

Music video
- "Afternoon Delight" on YouTube

"Afternoon Delight" is a song recorded by Starland Vocal Band. It was written by band member Bill Danoff. It has since gained the reputation of "a song known for sexual innuendo", but it was also the "right song at the right time", evoking the Bicentennial summer's fireworks displays with the chorus "skyrockets in flight", becoming a No. 1 single on July 10, 1976. It earned a gold record. The song, according to band member Taffy Danoff, made the band a "one hit wonder" and was the main reason they are mentioned with other one hit wonders in the Rock and Roll Hall of Fame.

== Background and writing ==
The song was inspired by a restaurant menu at Clyde's in Georgetown, Washington, D.C. The happy hour menu was titled "Afternoon Delights", that included items like spiced shrimp and hot Brie with almonds. Bill Danoff was eating with fellow band member Margot Chapman, while his then-wife Taffy Danoff was in the hospital recovering from cancer surgery. He later explained to Taffy what "afternoon delights" really should mean, becoming the seed for the creation of "a song known for sexual innuendos". Danoff downplayed the lyrics: "I didn't want to write an all-out sex song ... I just wanted to write something that was fun and hinted at sex." He said "It just came out that way. I started having fun writing the song. As soon as I got the title idea.. it had obvious connotations." Danoff heard the song as a "fiddle tune" which "gave me the chance to write a lot of neat syllables in rhyme."

Taffy Danoff later noted the "song was the right thing at the right time. It was the summer of 1976, the country’s Bicentennial celebration". With a chorus evoking the summer's fireworks displays ('Skyrockets in flight'), it resonated with the public and reached the Billboard number one spot on July 10th, within days of the national July 4th celebrations.

Nevertheless, popularity did not fade after 1976. It became "an animal with a life of its own," noted Danoff. The song, according to Taffy Danoff, made the band into a "one hit wonder"; they never repeated the success. However, she credits it for the band's mention, along other one hit wonders, in the Rock and Roll Hall of Fame.

== Critical reaction ==
At the 19th Grammy Awards ceremony in 1977, "Afternoon Delight" received three nominations for recordings from 1976. It won the Grammy Award for Best Arrangement for Voices and was also nominated for Best Pop Performance by a Duo or Group with Vocals and Song of the Year. It was instrumental in Starland Vocal Band winning the Grammy for Best New Artist of 1976, beating out the band Boston, whose 1976 debut album Boston now ranks as one of the best-selling debut albums in U.S. history.

In 2022, Billboard ranked "Afternoon Delight" the 21st sexiest song of all time.

== Charts ==
=== Weekly charts ===
Chart (1976)	Peak position
Australia (Kent Music Report)	6
Canada RPM Top Singles	1
Canada RPM Adult Contemporary	6
Netherlands (Single Top 100)	22
New Zealand (Recorded Music NZ)	5
UK Singles (Official Charts)	18
US Billboard Hot 100	1
US Easy Listening (Billboard)	5
US Hot Country Songs (Billboard)	94

=== Year-end charts ===
Chart (1976)	Rank
Australia (Kent Music Report)	56
Canada RPM Top Singles	11
New Zealand	28
UK	120
US Billboard Hot 100	12
US Billboard Easy Listening	31
US Cash Box Top 100	7

=== All-time charts ===
Chart (1958–2018)	Position
US Billboard Hot 100	419

== Cover versions ==
"Afternoon Delight"

Single by Johnny Carver

from the album Afternoon Delight
- B-side: "Double Exposure"
- Released: 1976
- Recorded: 1976
- Genre: Country music
- Length: 2:56
- Label: Dot Records
- Songwriter: Bill Danoff
- Producer: Ron Chancey

Johnny Carver singles chronology
"Snap, Crackle and Pop" (1976)	"Afternoon Delight" (1976)	"Love Is Only Love (When Shared by Two)" (1976)

Music video
- "Afternoon Delight" on YouTube

Concurrent with the Starland Vocal Band version, country singer Johnny Carver's cover entered the Top 10 on Billboard Hot Country Singles.

In the 2004 film Anchorman: The Legend of Ron Burgundy, the song is sung a capella by the news crew in choir and referenced multiple times and came with a music video in the bonus disc, with lead vocals by star Will Ferrell. It was also performed in the musical television series Glee.

"Afternoon Delight" has been featured in episodes of numerous TV shows, including The Simpsons, Ugly Betty and NewsRadio. The song is featured in the Arrested Development episode "Afternoon Delight", where it is sung as Karaoke by Michael Bluth and his niece Maeby, before stopping upon realizing what the song is actually about. The characters Lindsay and George Michael later perform the song, before having a similar realization.

"Afternoon Delight" also plays a role in the movie Good Will Hunting, where it is sung by Matt Damon's character Will Hunting while in a therapist's office -- originally as a lark, but the song plays a more significant role later in the film.

=== Johnny Carver version ===
Chart (1976)	Peak position
US Billboard Hot Country Singles & Tracks	9
Canadian RPM Country Tracks	16

== See also ==
- List of 1970s one-hit wonders in the United States
