= Starland Vocal Band =

American pop band

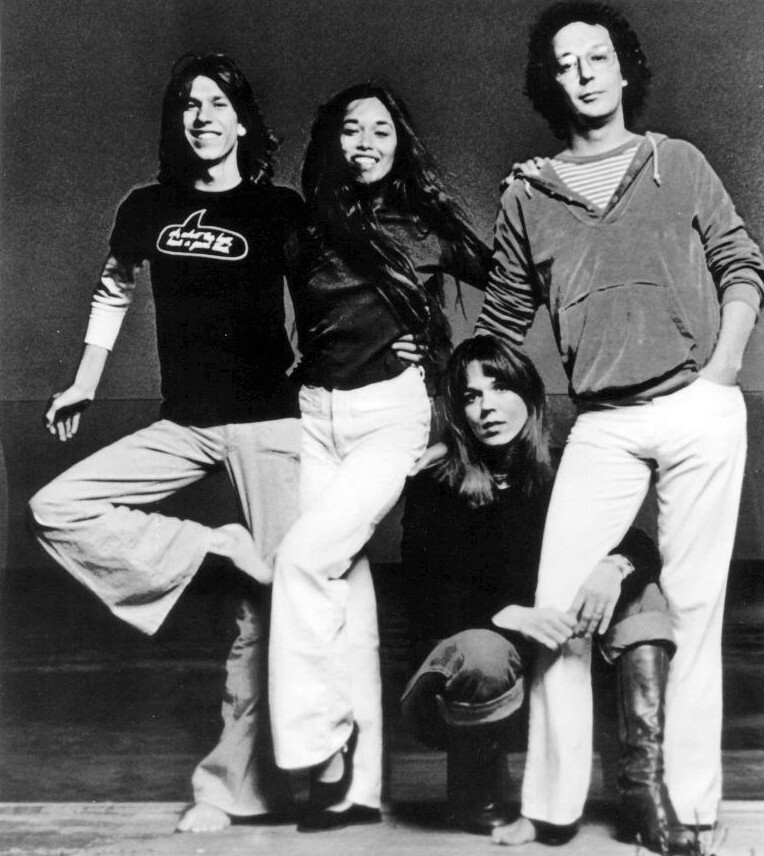
- Starland Vocal Band, June 1977, from left to right: Jon Carroll, Margot Chapman, Taffy Nivert, Bill Danoff

Background information
- Origin: Washington, D.C., U.S.
- Genres: Pop, folk rock, country, soft rock
- Works: Studio albums, singles
- Years active: 1975–1981, 1998, 2007
- Labels: RCA, Windsong
- Past members: Bill Danoff; Taffy Nivert; Jon Carroll; Margot Chapman

Starland Vocal Band was an American pop band, known for "Afternoon Delight", one of the biggest-selling singles of 1976.

== Career ==
The group began as Fat City, a husband/wife duo of Bill Danoff and Taffy Nivert.

Danoff and Nivert co-wrote the song "I Guess He'd Rather Be in Colorado" and then, with John Denver, "Take Me Home, Country Roads", which became a hit single in 1971 and became an official song of West Virginia in 2014. The duo recorded two albums as Fat City (Reincarnation, Welcome to Fat City), and two more as Bill & Taffy (Pass It On, Aces), all released from 1969 to 1974.

In the mid-1970s, Starland Vocal Band was formed and subsequently signed to Denver's label Windsong Records. Starland Vocal Band also included Jon Carroll (keyboards, guitar, vocals) and Margot Chapman (vocals). Carroll and Chapman also became a couple, marrying in 1978.

The group's debut album was the self-titled Starland Vocal Band and included "Afternoon Delight". The song was a US number one hit and the album also charted. They were nominated for four Grammy Awards in 1977 and won two: Best Arrangement for Voices and Best New Artist, the latter award over the group Boston. The song also reached number 18 on the UK Singles Chart. The follow-up album, Rear View Mirror, did not fare as well, with 13 weeks on the Billboard 200 and a peak of number 104.

The band hosted a variety show, The Starland Vocal Band Show, that ran on CBS for six weeks in the summer of 1977. David Letterman was a writer and regular on the show, which also featured Mark Russell, Jeff Altman, and Proctor and Bergman. April Kelly was a writer for the series.

Unable to match their previous success, the band broke up in 1981. Carroll and Chapman divorced later that year followed by Danoff and Nivert in 1982. All four members went on to pursue solo careers. They have remained on friendly terms, and in 1998 the group reunited for a few concerts, often featuring the children of the four original members as additional vocalists. In 2007, they appeared on a 1970s special on the New Jersey Network (NJN), singing "Afternoon Delight".

In 2010, Billboard named "Afternoon Delight" the 20th sexiest song of all time. Due to its success, the song was featured in such films as PCU, Anchorman, and Good Will Hunting, and used in episodes of numerous TV shows, including The Simpsons and South Park. In 2011, it was performed in the musical television series Glee.

== Discography ==
=== Studio albums ===
Year	Album details	Peak chart positions
Year	Album details	US
1976	Starland Vocal Band: Release date: 1976; Label: Windsong 1351	20
1977	Rear View Mirror: Release date: April 15, 1977; Label: Windsong 2239	104
1978	Late Nite Radio: Release date: March 1978; Label: Windsong 2598	—
1980	4 X 4: Release date: March 11, 1980; Label: Windsong 3536	—
1980	Christmas at Home: Release date: November 25, 1980; Label: Breaker 100	—
"—" denotes releases that did not chart.

A CD compilation album, Afternoon Delight: The Best of the Starland Vocal Band, was released in 1995 by K-tel. Also in 1995, Collectables released Afternoon Delight: A Golden Classics Edition which included all tracks from the first two albums.

=== Singles ===
Year	A/B-side songs	Catalog # (Windsong)	Peak chart positions					Album
Year	A/B-side songs	Catalog # (Windsong)	US	AUS	CAN	CAN AC	UK	Album
1976	"Afternoon Delight" / "Starland"	10588	1	6	1	6	18	Starland Vocal Band
1976	"California Day" / "War Surplus Baby"	10785	66	—	—	22	—	Starland Vocal Band
1976	"Hail! Hail! Rock and Roll!" / "Ain't It the Fall"	10855	71	—	92	—	—	Starland Vocal Band
1977	"Afternoon Delight" / "California Day"	10943	—	—	—	—	—	Starland Vocal Band
1977	"Liberated Woman" / "Fallin' in a Deep Hole"	10992	—	—	—	—	—	Rear View Mirror
1977	"The Light of My Life" / "Prism"	11067	—	—	—	36	—	Rear View Mirror
1977	"Mr. Wrong" / Too Long a Journey"	11168	—	—	—	33	—	Rear View Mirror
1978	"Late Nite Radio" / "Please Ms. Newslady"	11261	—	—	—	—	—	Late Nite Radio
1980	"Loving You with My Eyes" / "Apartment for Rent"	11899	71	—	—	26	—	4 X 4
1980	"(Love) Thought I Would Never Find Love" / "Love Stuff"	12011	—	—	—	—	—	4 X 4
"—" denotes releases that did not chart or were not released in that territory.

== Awards and nominations ==
=== Grammy Awards ===
The Grammy Awards are awarded annually by the National Academy of Recording Arts and Sciences. The band won two awards from four nominations.

Year	Nominee / work	Award	Result
1977	Starland Vocal Band	Best New Artist	Won
1977	"Afternoon Delight"	Record of the Year	Nominated
1977	"Afternoon Delight"	Best Pop Performance by a Duo or Group with Vocals	Nominated
1977	"Afternoon Delight"	Best Arrangement for Voices (duo, group or chorus)	Won

== See also ==
- List of 1970s one-hit wonders in the United States
