= Please Don't Tell (That Sweet Ole Lady of Mine) =

Don’t Tell (That Sweet Ole Lady of Mine)

Studio album by Johnny Carver
- Released: 1974
- Recorded: 1973
- Studio: Woodland (Nashville, Tennessee)
- Genre: Country
- Label: ABC Records
- Producer: Ron Chancey

Johnny Carver chronology
Double Exposure (1974)	Don’t Tell (That Sweet Ole Lady of Mine) (1974)	Strings (1975)

Don’t Tell (That Sweet Ole Lady of Mine) is the eighth album by American country singer/songwriter Johnny Carver, released in 1974 on the ABC Records label. The title track, "Don’t Tell (That Sweet Ole Lady of Mine)", reached #10 in the Billboard Country Chart and #47 in the Canadian Country Charts. Another single from the album, "January Jones", reached #39 in the US Country Charts. The album itself reached #23 in the Country Albums chart.

== Track listing ==
Side 1

1. "Don’t Tell (That Sweet Ole Lady of Mine)" (L. R. Brown/I. Levine) – 2:39
2. "I Think I’m Falling in Love" (Johnny Carver) – 2:07
3. "Did We Even Try" (Johnny Carver/Ron Chancey) – 2:38
4. "(The Likes of) Louise" (C. Taylor) – 2:26
5. "There Ain’t no Way, Babe" (Rice/Riis/Fields) – 2:40

Side 2

1. "It Ain’t no Little Thing" (D. Burgess/D. Pfrimmer) – 2:48
2. "Immediate Possession" (R. Bourke/R. Chancey) – 2:35
3. "January Jones" (R. Bourke) – 3:01
4. "Seven Times Last Week" (R. Griff) – 2:24
5. "World in My Arms" (J. Adrian) – 3:30

== Musicians ==
- Steel Guitar: Lloyd Green
- Dobro: Jerry Shook, Jimmy Capps, Jim Colvard
- Electric Guitar: Jimmy Capps
- Rhythm Guitar: Chip Young, Johnny Christopher
- Electric Bass Guitar: Tommy Allsup
- Piano: Hargus "Pig" Robbins, Larry Butler
- Bass: Bob Moore, Curtis Young
- Drums: Buddy Harman
- Harmonica: Charlie McCoy
- Organ: Ron Oats, Charlie McCoy
- Vibes: Ron Oates
- Strings: Gary Vanosdale, Marvin Chantry, Martha McCrory, Carl Gorodetzky, Stephanie Wolfe, Lennie Haight, George Binkley III, Byron T. Bach, Brenton B. Banks & Sheldon Kurland.
- String Arrangements on “January Jones”: Bergen White
- Background Vocals: The Nashville Edition (Hurshel Wiginton, Delores Edgin, Joe Babcock, Sharon Vaughn & Ricky Page)

== Production ==
- Producer: Ron Chancey
- Recorded at Woodland Sound Studios, Nashville, Tennessee
- Recording Engineers: Tom Semmes, Rex Collier & David McKinley
- Backup Engineer: Pat Higdon
- Mixer: Tom Semmes
- Mastering Engineer: Bob Sowell
- Album Photography: Ken Kim
