= Taffy Nivert =

American singer-songwriter

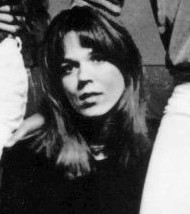
- Nivert as she appeared in a Starland Vocal Band promotional photo dated June 1977

Background information
- Born: Mary Catherine Nivert; October 25, 1944 (age 81); Washington, D.C., U.S.
- Occupations: Songwriter, singer

Mary Catherine "Taffy" Nivert (born October 25, 1944) is an American songwriter and singer. She is best known for co-writing "Take Me Home, Country Roads", which was popularized by John Denver, and for being a member of the Starland Vocal Band.

== Biography ==
Mary Catherine Nivert was born 25 October 1944 in Washington, DC. She received her nickname Taffy from her elder brother who, unable to pronounce her middle name as a young child, would call her Mary Tafferine. Nivert began singing along with the radio in high school. She was discovered by a bartender in Georgetown after he heard her singing to a jukebox. The bartender asked if she wanted to join a vocal group, and through this, she met her future husband, Bill Danoff.

Nivert began performing with Danoff as Fat City in the late 1960s. Initially a folk duo, the two later married and recorded four albums, the latter two under the name Bill and Taffy.

In 1970, while traveling along Clopper Road to Nivert's family reunion in Germantown, Maryland, Danoff began writing a song that became "Take Me Home, Country Roads". The couple planned to complete the song and sell it to Johnny Cash. When Fat City opened for John Denver at The Cellar Door in December 1970, they decided to show the not-yet-completed song to him. Denver, who had injured his thumb in a car crash hours before, arrived at Danoff and Nivert's apartment in the early hours of the morning, where the trio finished the song. The next night, all three performed the completed song, with Nivert holding the lyric sheet, and instead of being offered to Johnny Cash it became a hit song for Denver on RCA Victor in early 1971. It was included on his album Poems, Prayers, and Promises along with "I Guess He'd Rather Be in Colorado," also written by Danoff and Nivert. Danoff and Nivert sang backup on four of the album's tracks.

Danoff and Nivert married in 1972. In 1976, the couple paired with Jon Carroll and Margot Chapman to form the Starland Vocal Band. Signed to John Denver's record label Windsong Records, they were most famous for the hit song "Afternoon Delight". The group released several albums without duplicating the success of "Afternoon Delight" before breaking up in 1981. Danoff and Nivert later divorced.

Until 2011, Nivert lived in the Washington, DC, area, where she occasionally performed with Danoff and the rest of the Starland Vocal Band. She later settled in Safety Harbor, Florida.

== Discography ==
Albums

Fat City

- Reincarnation (ABC, 1969)
- Welcome to Fat City (Paramount, 1971)

John Denver with Bill Danoff - Taffy Nivert

- Victory Is Peace (Tomorrow Entertainment ER-7209-LP, 1972)

Bill & Taffy

- Pass It On (RCA, 1973)
- Aces (RCA, 1974)

Starland Vocal Band

- Five albums; details at SVB page

Singles

John Denver with Fat City

- "Take Me Home, Country Roads" / "Poems, Prayers And Promises" (RCA, 1971)

Bill & Taffy

- "Pass It On" / "Didn't I Try" (RCA UK, 1973)
- "Maybe" / "How Lucky Can You Be" (RCA Germany, 1974)
- "Maybe" (stereo) / "Maybe" (mono) (RCA promo, 1974)

Starland Vocal Band

- Ten singles; details at SVB page
