= Bill Danoff =

American songwriter and singer (born 1946)

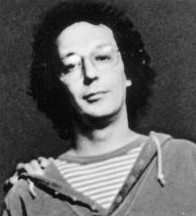
- Danoff as he appeared in a Starland Vocal Band promotional photo dated June 1977

Background information
- Born: William Thomas Danoff; May 7, 1946 (age 80); Springfield, Massachusetts, U.S.
- Occupations: Songwriter, singer

William Thomas Danoff (born May 7, 1946) is an American songwriter and singer. He is known for "Afternoon Delight", which he wrote and performed as a member of the Starland Vocal Band, and for writing songs recorded by John Denver, including the hit "Take Me Home, Country Roads", which he co-wrote.

== Early life and education ==
Danoff is a 1964 graduate of Cathedral High School in Springfield, Massachusetts, and of Georgetown University.

== Career ==
=== Songwriting ===
Danoff and his then-wife Taffy Nivert wrote "I Guess He'd Rather Be in Colorado" and "Take Me Home, Country Roads," both of which were hits for John Denver. "Take Me Home, Country Roads" is an official state song of West Virginia. Danoff has stated he had never been in West Virginia before co-writing the song, having written it in a house in the Georgetown neighborhood of Washington, D.C. He had even briefly considered using "Massachusetts" rather than "West Virginia", as both four-syllable state names would have fit the song's meter. Denver recorded about a dozen Danoff compositions from 1972 through the end of his career.

Danoff also worked with Emmylou Harris, co-authoring "Boulder to Birmingham" (one of Harris' better-known compositions). This track was recorded by The Walker Brothers in 1975 and The Hollies in 1976, and became a Top 10 hit in New Zealand. In 1982, Danoff and fellow Starland Vocal Band member Jon Carroll wrote "Who Knows How To Make Love Stay", a Top 40 Canadian hit for Doug and the Slugs.

Danoff taught a songwriters course in 2007 and a music industry seminar (with Walter Egan) in 2008 at his alma mater Georgetown University.

=== Starland Vocal Band ===
On the strength of their track record as songwriters, Danoff and Taffy Nivert recorded several albums before forming the Starland Vocal Band with local musicians Jon Carroll and Margot Chapman. The group recorded "Afternoon Delight" which became a hit in July 1976, reaching #1 on the Hot 100 on July 10. The Starland Vocal Band Show replaced Rhoda as a half-hour weekly series that same summer. Danoff and Nivert also worked with director Robert Altman and producer Jerry Weintraub on the film Nashville, doing research with screenwriter Joan Tewkesbury.

== Personal life ==
Danoff married Taffy Nivert in 1972. Both were part of the Starland Vocal Band; they divorced after the band’s breakup in 1981.

His son, singer-songwriter Owen Danoff (born November 3, 1989), was a contestant on season 10 of NBC's The Voice.

== Discography ==
Albums

Fat City

- Reincarnation (ABC, 1969)
- Welcome To Fat City (Paramount, 1971)

John Denver with Bill Danoff - Taffy Nivert

- Victory Is Peace (Tomorrow Entertainment ER-7209-LP, 1972)

Bill & Taffy

- Pass It On (RCA, 1973)
- Aces (RCA, 1974)

Starland Vocal Band

- Five albums; details at SVB page

Bill Danoff

- Souvenir (Watch Your Head, 1990)
- I Guess He'd Rather Be In Colorado (Watch Your Head, 2002)
- Blasted In The Basement (Oasis, 2007)

Singles

John Denver with Fat City

- "Take Me Home, Country Roads" / "Poems, Prayers And Promises" (RCA, 1971)

Bill & Taffy

- "Pass It On" / "Didn't I Try" (RCA UK, 1973)
- "Maybe" / "How Lucky Can You Be" (RCA Germany, 1974)
- "Maybe" (stereo) / "Maybe" (mono) (RCA promo, 1974)

Starland Vocal Band

- Ten singles; details at SVB page

Appearances

- Capital Acoustics: Contemporary & Traditional Folk Music of the Washington DC Area (Institute of Musical Traditions, 1991), "Trying To Live In Time"
- The 8th Annual World Folk Music Association Benefit Concert (World Folk Music Association, 1993), "Potter's Wheel"
- Jon Carroll and Love Returns at the Barns at Wolf Trap (FestivaLink, 2007, Internet release), "Blasted In The Basement"
